= Alpinorum auxiliary regiments =

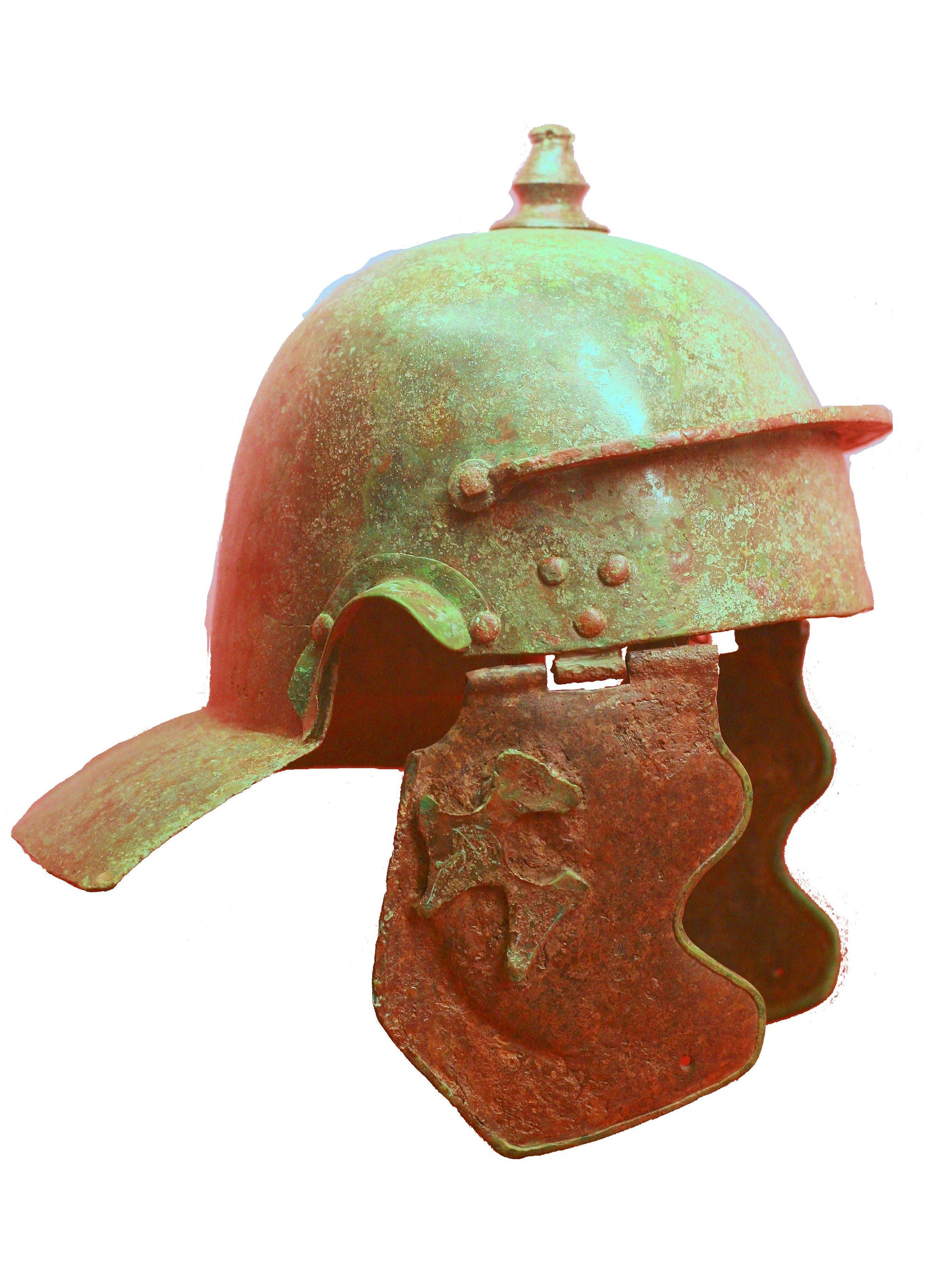
Roman infantry helmet (Imperial Gallic type). Late 1st century

This article concerns the Roman auxiliary regiments of the Principate period originally recruited in the western Alpine regions of the empire (for the central/eastern Alps, see Raetorum auxiliary cohorts). The cohortes Alpinorum ("cohorts of Alpini") came from Tres Alpes, the three small Roman provinces of the western Alps, Alpes Maritimae, Alpes Cottiae and Alpes Graiae. The cohortes Ligurum were originally raised from the Ligures people of Alpes Maritimae and Liguria regio of NW Italia.

== Introduction ==
=== Auxiliary unit nomenclature ===
Most regiments carried a number and a name (normally a peregrini tribal name) e.g. I Raetorum. A few regiments had no number. A confusing aspect of auxiliary unit nomenclature is that in some cases, more than one regiment can appear in the record with the same number and name e.g. there are two I Raetorum units attested in the 2nd century. In a few cases there is dispute as to whether it really is two distinct regiments, as opposed to the same regiment moving from one province to another or two detachments of the same regiment in different provinces at the same time. But in most cases, there is no doubt two separate regiments are involved. They can usually be distinguished by whether one is equitata or not, or has a c.R. title or not e.g. I Raetorum and I Raetorum c.R.

The explanation for duplicated names is that where more than one series of cohorts was raised from the same original tribe, numbering would start from 1 again, especially if the second series was raised by a different emperor. The same factor affected the numbering of legions.

=== Auxiliary unit types ===
There were three basic types of auxiliary regiment. (1) an ala (literally "wing") was a purely cavalry regiment of 480 horse. (2) a cohors ("cohort") was a purely infantry regiment of 480 foot. (3) a cohors equitata was a mixed infantry/cavalry regiment of 600 men (480 infantry, 120 cavalry). A minority of regiments were denoted milliaria which meant they were nominally double-strength: in practice 720 men for an ala milliaria, 800 for a cohors milliaria and 1,040 (800 inf/240 cav) for a cohors equitata milliaria. In addition, some regiments were denoted sagittaria (from sagitta, "arrow") meaning they were composed of archers.

=== The c.R. title ===
The honorific title civium Romanorum (c.R. for short) was normally awarded by the emperor for valour to an auxiliary regiment as a whole. The award would include the grant of Roman citizenship to all the regiment's men, but not to subsequent recruits to the regiment. The regiment, however, would retain the prestigious title in perpetuity. Until 212, only a minority of the empire's inhabitants (inc. all Italians) held full Roman citizenship. The rest were denoted peregrini, a second-class status. Since the legions admitted only citizens, peregrini could only enlist in the auxilia. Citizenship carried a number of tax and other privileges and was highly sought after. It could also be earned by serving the minimum 25-year term in the auxilia. In 212, all the inhabitants of the empire were granted full Roman citizenship and so the title became redundant.

=== Records ===
The literary evidence for auxiliary regiments is almost non-existent. Unlike for the legions, ancient Roman historians only rarely mention the auxilia at all, and never denote a specific unit. Knowledge of the auxilia is therefore dependent on inscriptions found bearing the regiment's name. Many of these are not datable (even roughly) and so are of limited value.

The epigraphic record includes: (1) inscriptions from Roman military diplomas, which were bronze certificates of Roman citizenship awarded to peregrini soldiers who completed the minimum 25 years' service in the auxilia: these are very useful as, if complete, they contain a precise date and the province in which the regiment was serving at the time (as well the name, origin and rank of the recipient). (2) tiles or bricks, used in building work on Roman forts, stamped with the regiment's name. These show the forts where a regiment may have been based, but are rarely datable. (3) votive stone altars or tablets, and tombstones. These can indicate the addressee's origin if they are found in provinces away from the regiment's base. A minority are datable.

The datable epigraphic record is very incomplete. Most of the regiments attested in the 2nd century are believed by inference to have been established in the early Julio-Claudian period, i.e. before 37 AD, but very few have left records dating to before 75.

=== Provinces deployed ===
Auxiliary regiments were mostly stationed in one province long-term. The Flavian (69-96) saw a lot of changes in auxiliary deployment in what appears a deliberate policy of deploying regiments away from their original home province. After that, deployments generally became much more settled, with most units remaining in the same province throughout the 2nd and 3rd centuries. Regiments, or detachments of regiments, could be summoned to participate in a major campaign elsewhere, but this would usually be just a short-term deployment.

=== Forts garrisoned ===
Auxiliary regiments were normally attached, for operational purposes, to a particular legion. The praefectus (commander) of the regiment would report to the legatus legionis (legion commander). Auxiliary regiments were mostly housed in Roman forts in frontier provinces or even beyond the empire's settled borders, to keep watch on barbarian activity. A regiment would usually garrison a fort alone, but sometimes shared with another regiment if it was a larger fort. More rarely, regiments appear to have been housed in the castra legionaria (legionary fortress) of the legion they were attached to. Although inscriptions, especially the regiment's tile- and brick-stamps, can attest which forts the regiment occupied, most are not datable and so it is rarely possible to reconstruct a precise sequence or chronology of forts occupied.

=== Personnel origins ===
Auxiliary personnel left traces in inverse proportion to their numbers, for the obvious reason that memorials such as votive altars or tombstones were expensive and could be better afforded the higher the rank. Thus the names of more praefecti (commanders) and principales (officers) are attested than of caligati (common soldiers, literally "booted" from caliga, the Roman marching sandal), even though caligati constituted over 80% of personnel. The origin of the dedicator/deceased person is often impossible to establish. Sometimes the origin is recorded in the inscription. More commonly, it can be inferred from the location of the inscription if it is away from the province in which the regiment was based.

== The Alpini people ==
Several Celtic-speaking tribes inhabited the western Alps, most notably the Salassi of the Alpes Graiae (Val d'Aosta). They were finally subdued by Rome and their territory annexed in 15 BC.

The Ligures occupied the coastal western Alps and the eponymous region of Liguria in NW Italy. Their language may have been either Celtic, related to Gaulish, or a non Indo-European tongue related to the Iberian languages spoken in pre-Roman Spain.

== Alpinorum cohorts ==
As mountain people, the Alpini et al. supplied mainly infantry: all the regiments in this article are cohortes save for one ala Noricorum. According to Holder, a total of 7 cohortes Alpinorum were raised, in two series, in the early 1st century. Of the first series, II Alpina is attested only in the early 1st century (in a single inscription) and was therefore evidently disbanded or destroyed in action. The other 6 survived into the 2nd century.

However, Holder's analysis requires 4 regiments called I Alpinorum: I Alpinorum, I Alpinorum eq (1), I Alpinorum eq (2) and I Alpinorum peditata. Spaul disputes this, claiming there were just two: I Alpinorum eq and I Alpinorum ped. Spaul's view seems more likely. The II Alpina mentioned above was, according to Holder, in the first series. Therefore, it is reasonable to assume that the first of the series was named I Alpina (unattested) and not I Alpinorum. The reason for assuming 2 I Alpinorum equitata that a unit of that name is attested both in Dacia Sup and Pannonia Inf. But it could well be the same unit shuttling between the two provinces, which were in the same region.

Two cohortes Ligurum were raised under Augustus, Ligurum equitata (no number, attested) and II Ligurum (unattested but inferred). After 70 AD they were merged with a Spanish and Corsican unit respectively, to form I Ligurum et Hispanorum c.R. and II gemina Ligurum et Corsorum. Both survived into the 2nd century.

In conclusion, a total of 7 Alpinorum, Ligurum, Montanorum and Noricorum regiments appear to have been raised in the Julio-Claudian era. Of these 6 survived in the 2nd century, although 2 of these amalgamated with other units. The following table displays the available evidence for each cohors. However, new information, in the form of diplomas or other inscriptions, continues to be discovered each year.

ALPINORUM AND LIGURUM COHORTS: Summary of available evidence
Cohors name	Period founded	Earliest record	Latest record	Provinces deployed (minimum periods)	Forts occupied	Personnel origins known (date)
I Alpinorum peditata	J-Claudian (ante 68)	80	c. 210	Pannonia Superior 80–167; Dacia Superior 179; Pannonia c. 210	PS: Poetovio/Carnuntum (to 107); Lussonium (107-67); Mursa (167-79)	praefecti: 1 Italian principales: 3 Italians
I Alpinorum equitata	J-Claudian (ante 68)	60	c. 215	Illyricum 60; Pannonia Inferior 80–143; Dacia Superior 144; Pann Inf 148-c. 215	PI:Carnuntum; Szazholombatta; DCS: Apulum (144); PS: Mursa (c. 215)	praefecti: 1 Africa (c. 103); 1 Syria Palaestina caligati 1 Illyrian (159)
II Alpinorum equitata	J-Claudian (ante 68)	60	223-35	Illyricum 60; Pannonia Superior 84-223	PS: Mursa; Baratsföldpuszta; Dunaubogdány (185, 223)	praefecti: 1 city of Rome principales: 1 Illyrian
III Alpinorum equitata	J-Claudian (ante 68)	75	216-21	Dalmatia 75-216	D: Humac; Burnum; Salona; Muć; PS: Baratsföldpuszta.	principales: 1 Illyrian, 1 Alpini caligati: 1 Gaul, 1 Alpini
I Ligurum et Hispanorum quondam I Ligurum	Augustus (ante 14)	1st century	134	Alpes Maritimae 1st century; Germania Superior 116-34	AM: Cimiez (1st century); GS: Niedenberg (early 2nd century)	praefecti:: 1 Italian, 1 city of Rome principales: 7 Alpini (1st century), 1 Sardinian. caligati: 8 Alpini (1st century), 1 Gaul, 1 Illyrian
II gemina Ligurum et Corsorum quondam II Ligurum	Augustus (ante 14)	88	153	Sardinia 88–96; Syria 153		principales: 2 Sardinians

== See also ==
- Auxiliaries (Roman military)
- List of Roman auxiliary regiments
- Alpine regiments of the Roman army
