= Cohors III Alpinorum equitata =

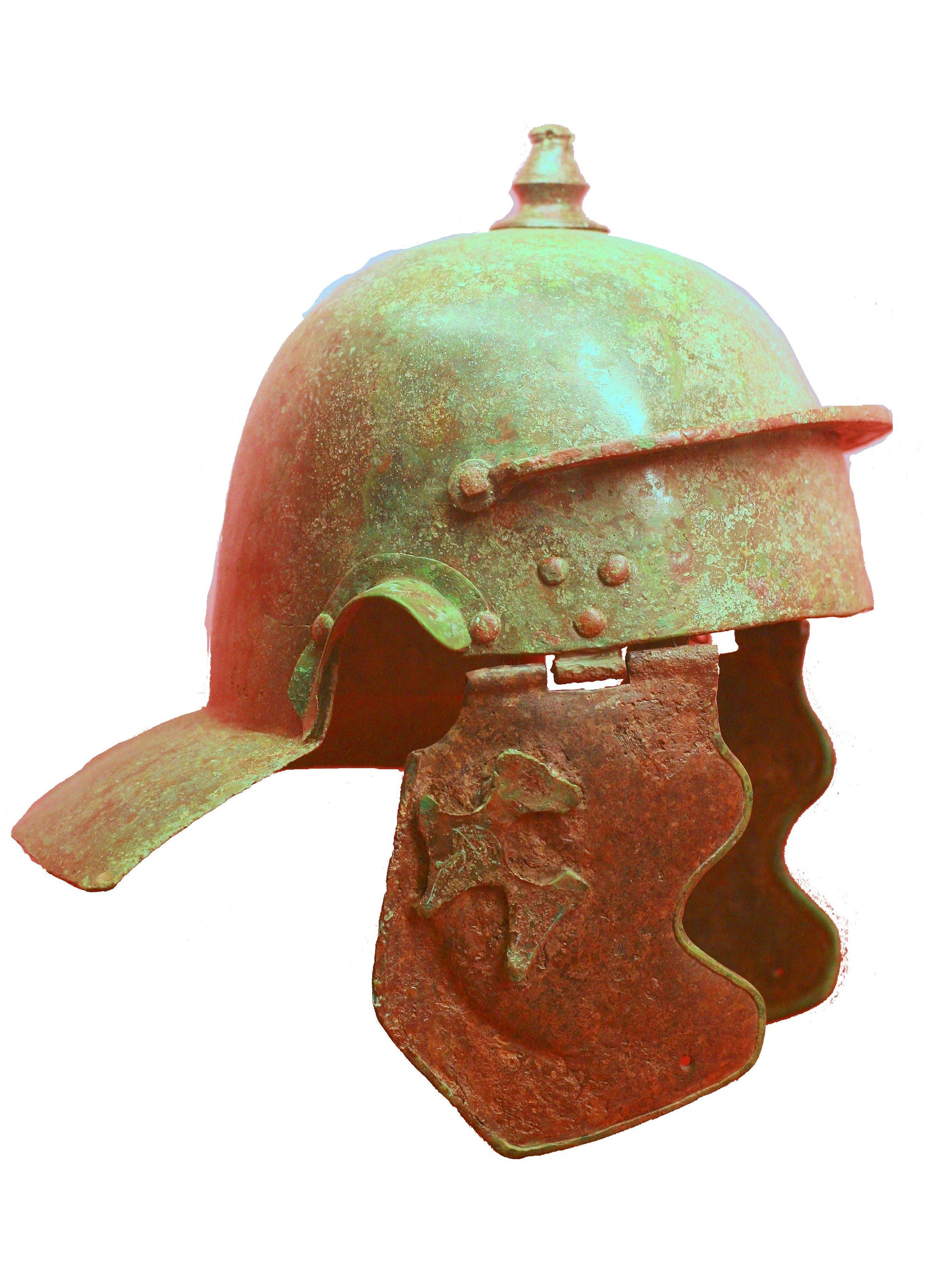
- Roman infantry helmet (late 1st century)
- Active: early 1st century to at least early 3rd century
- Country: Roman Empire
- Type: Roman auxiliary cohort
- Role: infantry/cavalry
- Size: 600 men (480 infantry, 120 cavalry)
- Garrison/HQ: Dalmatia 75 - early 3rd century Pannonia

Cohors tertia Alpinorum equitata ("3rd part-mounted Cohort of Alpini") was a Roman auxiliary mixed infantry and cavalry regiment. Alpini was a generic name denoting several Celtic-speaking mountain tribes inhabiting the Alps between Italy and Gaul, which were organised as the Tres Alpes provinces.

The regiment was probably raised as one of 4–6 Alpini units recruited after the final annexation of the western Alpine regions by emperor Augustus in 15 BC. It first appears in the datable epigraphic record in Tilurium, Dalmatia in 75 AD. It was still in Dalmatia in 93. It probably remained there for the whole of the 2nd century and moved to Pannonia (near Siscia) in the early 3rd century. However, in the absence of datable inscriptions, movements after 93 are speculative. The regiment's inscriptions have been found at the following Roman forts (in likely order of occupation): Humac; Burnum; Salona; Muć; Baratsföldpuszta (Pannonia).

The names of five praefecti (regimental commanders) are preserved (none has a certain origin); four centuriones (infantry officers), and two decuriones (cavalry officers) are recorded, although only one has a certain origin (Celeia, Slovenia). Junior officers attested are a signifer (standard-bearer), tesserarius (watch officer) and a tubicen (trumpeter). Of these only the tubicen s origin is known: the Caturiges, a tribe in the Gallic Alps. The names of 13 caligati (common soldiers) are extant. One is of the Bodionti, probably a Gallic tribe. Another is from the Alpes Maritimae province, where the regiment was originally (partially) recruited.

== See also ==
- Roman auxiliaries
- List of Roman auxiliary regiments
