= Alpine regiments of the Roman army =

Classical era military units

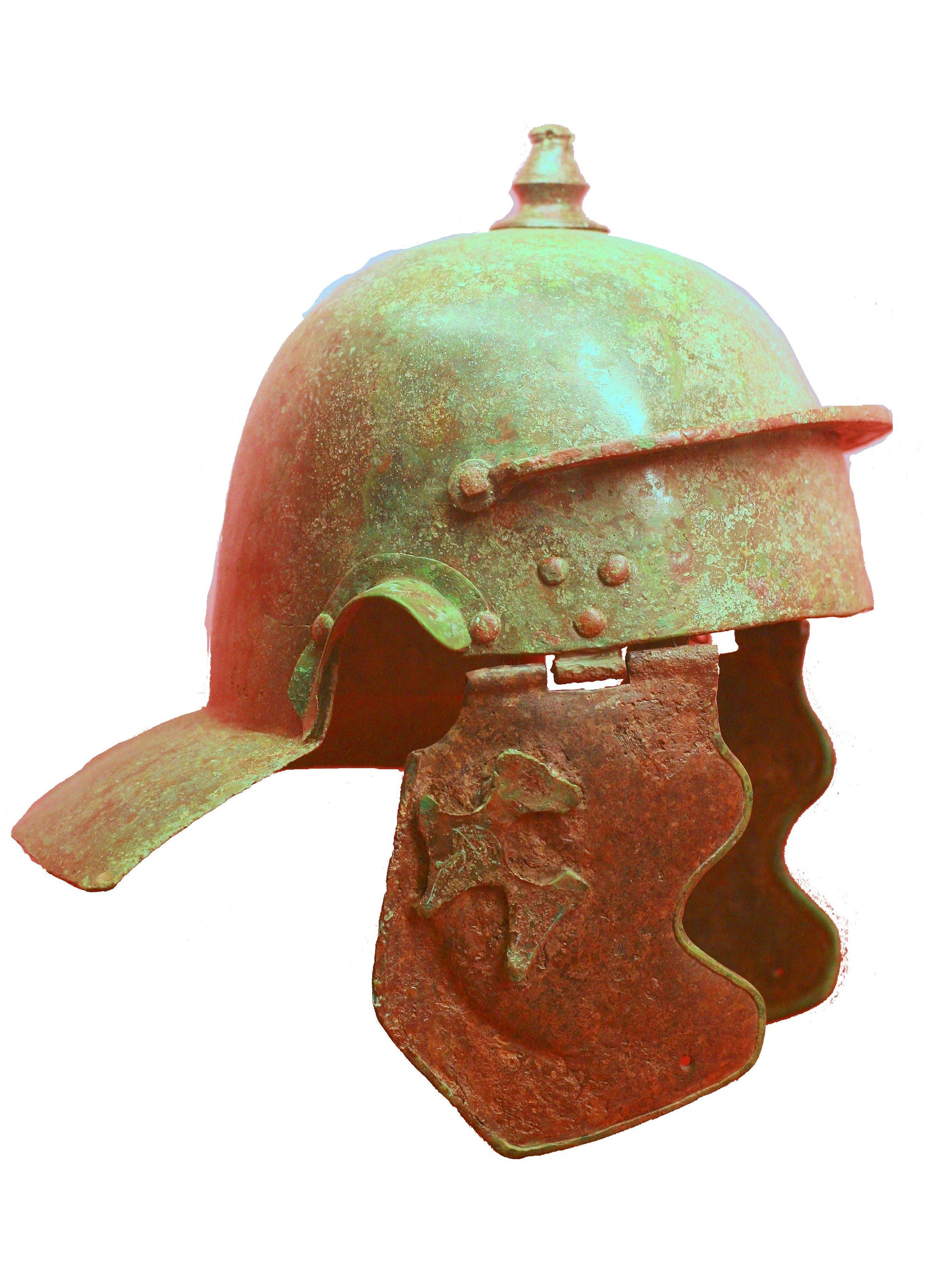
Roman infantry helmet (Imperial Gallic type). Late 1st century

The Roman Empire in the time of Hadrian (ruled 117–138 AD), showing the Alpine provinces of Tres Alpes, Raetia (including Vindelicia) and Noricum

The Alpine regiments of the Roman army were those auxiliary units of the army that were originally raised in the Alpine provinces of the Roman Empire: Tres Alpes, Raetia and Noricum. All these regions were inhabited by predominantly Rhaetian peoples and Celtic-speaking tribes. They were annexed, or at least occupied, by the emperor Augustus' forces during the period 25–14 BC. The term "Alpine" is used geographically in this context and does not necessarily imply that the regiments in question were specialised in mountain warfare. However, in the Julio-Claudian period (27 BC – AD 68), when the regiments were still largely composed of Alpine recruits, it is likely that they were especially adept at mountain operations.

As would be expected from mountain people, the Alpine provinces predominantly supplied infantry; only one Alpine cavalry ala is recorded. About 26 Alpine regiments were raised in the Julio-Claudian period, the great majority under Augustus or his successor Tiberius (i.e., before AD 37). Of these, six regiments disappeared, either destroyed in action or disbanded, by AD 68. A further two regiments were raised by Vespasian (reigned from 69 to 79 AD). These and the 20 surviving Julio-Claudian units are recorded at least until the mid 2nd century, but by that time only around a quarter were still based in the Alpine provinces or in neighbouring Germania Superior (Upper Rhine area). The rest were scattered all over the empire and would probably have long since lost their ethnic Alpine identity through local recruitment.

== The Alpine peoples ==
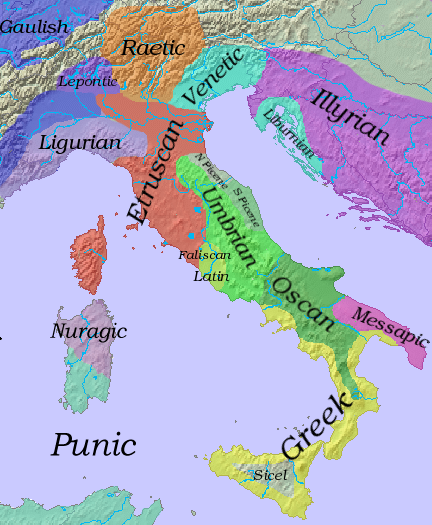
Linguistic map of Italy c. 500 BC. Gallic tribes (in dark blue) had already colonised the region of Piedmont. By 400 BC, they had overrun much of the rest of the Po plain. Raetian survived in the Alps. Note the small area where Latin was originally spoken

=== Ethno-linguistic affiliation ===
There is some debate about the linguistic affiliation of the many known Alpine tribes. The names of most can plausibly be derived from Celtic stem-words implying a predominant Celtic element. (Note: Etymology of Alpine tribal names: Many of the known names of Alpine tribes have plausible Celtic derivations. Examples include: Caturiges from catu- ("fight" or "armed host"); Nantuates, from nantu- ("valley"). The Taurisci and Taurini probably derive from taruo- "("bull"), although in the case of the Taurini this could equally derive from tauros, the Italic for "bull". The chief town in the Val di Susa, Segusio (Susa), prob. derives from sego- ("strong", "brave") and the personal name of king Cottius from cotto- ("crooked").) Non-Celtic elements also existed, however. The Raeti are described as Etruscans by the classical authors, and probably spoke Raetian, a non Indo-European tongue apparently related to Etruscan (and written in the Etruscan alphabet). The Ligures, including the Taurini, were an Indo-European language but with an important pre-Indo-European substrate. Polybius, the earliest extant writer on Roman history (c. 130 BC), draws a clear distinction between "Celts" (i.e. Gauls) and Ligures. The Breuni and Genauni, two of the tribes on Pliny's list, are classified as Illyrian by Strabo.

There is substantial evidence, however, that the non-Celtic elements had been largely assimilated by Celtic influences by the time of Augustus.

In the western Alps, the Ligures probably spoke an Indo-European language with strong Celtic similarities but also Italic, by that time. For example, Strabo describes one tribe in Provence (SE Gaul) as "Celtoligures". The Lepontii are one of the tribes classified as Raetian by Strabo. Their original language was therefore probably Raetian. But from the available inscriptions, the Lepontic language is believed to be Celtic, with some residual non Indo-European elements - a parallel to Celtiberian in Spain. The Raeti themselves appear to have undergone assimilation, as Livy states that their language (Raetian) had become much corrupted. Celtisation is also implied by the establishment of joint Raetorum et Vindelicorum regiments alongside the Celtic-speaking Vindelici, and by the union of the territories of both peoples to form the Raetia et Vindelicia province. This assimilation was probably the result of the great migrations of Gallic tribes across the Alps, which, according to Livy, started in c. 600 BC, continued until c. 400 BC and ended in the occupation and Celtisation of much of the Po Valley and of the Alpine regions through which the migrants passed.

The same process of Celtisation appears to have taken place in the eastern Alps. Before the immigration of the Celts (from c. 400 BC onwards), this region was dominated by Venetic and Illyrian tribes such as the Carni and Istri respectively. But little trace of the non-Celtic tribes has remained in the placenames, personal names and inscriptions of Noricum. The Veneti are convincingly attested only in the Gail River valley (Carinthia, Austria) in the south of the region, while Illyrian evidence is very scarce. In contrast, over 800 secure Celtic attestations are known. The evidence suggests that, as in the western Alps, the non-Celtic elements were either displaced or assimilated, while their native languages had virtually disappeared by the time of the Roman conquest.

Overall, it is likely that Gaulish Celtic was the lingua franca of the Alps until replaced by Latin during the centuries of Roman rule: Livy states that Hannibal's guides for his crossing of the western Alps in 218 BC, who were Gallic Boii from the lower Po valley, could understand the "wild men of the mountains" through which they passed even when the latter spoke among themselves. In addition, the ancient authors often refer to the people of the eastern Alps as Galli transalpini.

=== Material culture ===
Although the Alpine tribes are described as "wild" or "savage" by the classical authors, their material culture was sophisticated, as it was predominantly of the La Tène variety, which is characterised by advanced metal-working techniques and of elaborate metal artwork. Indeed, the eponymous La Tène site is in the Alpine region, on Lake Neuchâtel, Switzerland. La Tène gradually replaced the pre-existing Halstatt culture in the eastern Alps in broadly the same period as that region was infiltrated by the Celts (c. 400 - 200 BC). Some scholars thus regard La Tène as a specifically Celtic culture, although most recent experts reject the linking of material culture to ethnic groups. In any event, by the time of the Roman conquest, the entire Alpine region was predominantly La Tène, including patterns of settlement (mainly hillforts) and funerary rites (mostly cremation).

One especially important feature of Alpine culture was chalybs Noricus ("Noric steel"), celebrated in Roman times, from the region of Noricum (Austria). The strength of iron is determined by its carbon content (the higher the content, the stronger the metal). The wrought iron produced in the Greco-Roman world generally contained only minimal traces of carbon and was too soft for tools and weapons. It thus needed to be carburised to at least 1.5% carbon content. The main Roman method of achieving this was to repeatedly reheat the wrought iron to a temperature of over 800 C (i.e. to "white heat") and hammer it in a charcoal fire, causing the iron to absorb carbon from the charcoal. This technique had been developed empirically, as there is no evidence that ancient iron producers understood the chemistry involved. The rudimentary methods of carburisation used rendered the quality of the iron ore critical to the production of good steel. The ore needed to be rich in manganese (an element which remains essential in modern steelmaking processes), but also to contain very little, or preferably zero phosphorus, whose presence would compromise the steel's hardness. The ore mined in Carinthia (S. Noricum) fulfills both criteria to an unusual degree. The Taurisci Celtic people of Noricum empirically discovered that their ore made superior steel around 500 BC and established a major steel-making industry around it. At Magdalensberg, a major production and trading centre was established, where a large number of specialised blacksmiths crafted a range of metal products, especially weapons. The finished products were mostly exported southwards, to Aquileia, a Roman colony founded in 180 BC.

== Roman conquest ==
=== Introduction ===
When he assumed sole control of the Roman empire in 30 BC, the emperor Augustus was faced with a pressing strategic anomaly. Although Rome had subjugated all Gaul up to the Rhine and much of Illyricum, the Alpine region which separated these possessions from Italy and from each other remained outside Roman control and in the hands of independent mountain tribes. These were warlike and troublesome, alternately attacking and robbing transient Roman troops and supply convoys or exacting exorbitant tolls from them for the privilege of using the key Alpine mountain passes e.g. the Salassi, who reportedly ambushed Julius Caesar on one occasion by hurling rocks on his army, charged Messalla extortionate fees for supplies and forced the escaping murderer of Caesar Decimus Brutus to pay a toll of one denarius per man to allow his army to cross the Great St Bernard Pass in 43 BC. That Rome's overland communications with its transalpine territories should be thus held to ransom was no longer tolerable, especially as Augustus was intent on advancing the Roman sphere of control as far as the Danube river.

A secondary strategic aim of annexing the Alpine regions was to seize control of their substantial mineral wealth, which included gold and the prized iron ore of Noricum.

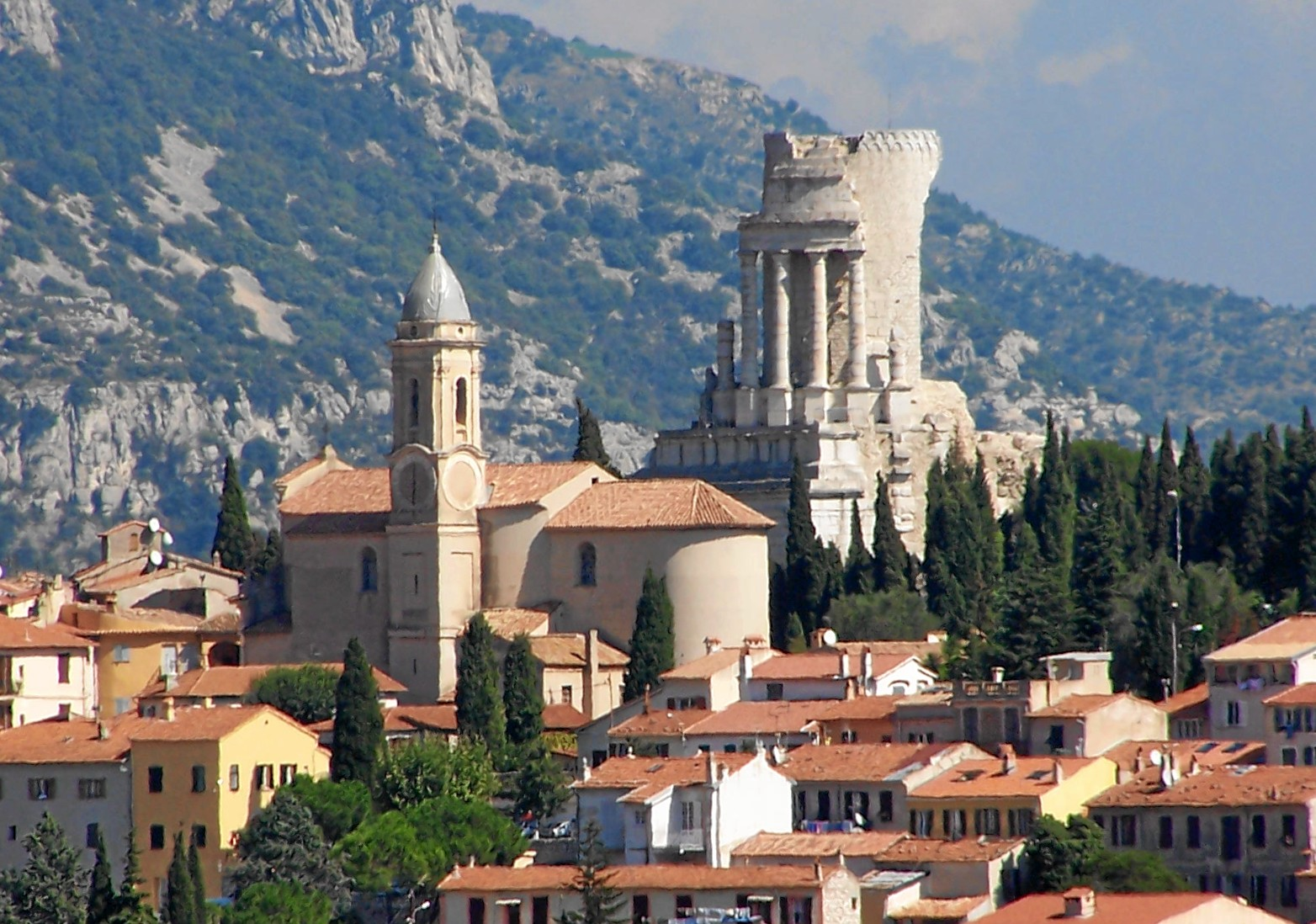
The Tropaeum Alpium, a monument to the emperor Augustus's victory over the tribes of the western Alps. Erected 7 BC. In foreground, the village of La Turbie, (Alpes-Maritimes, France) near Monaco

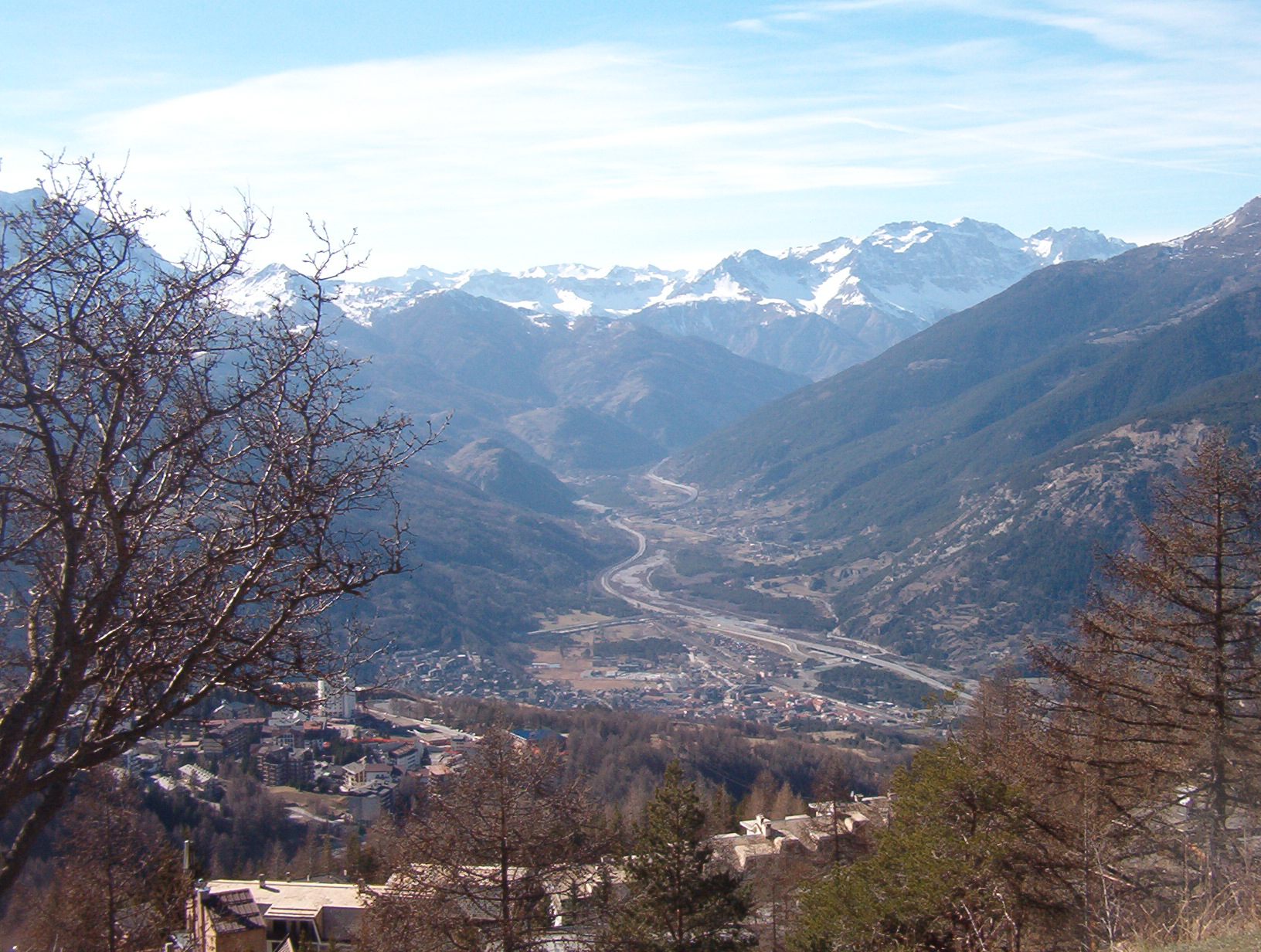
The Val di Susa, through which ran the main Roman road across the Alps from Italy to Gaul, via the Col de Montgenèvre, which lies in the left background

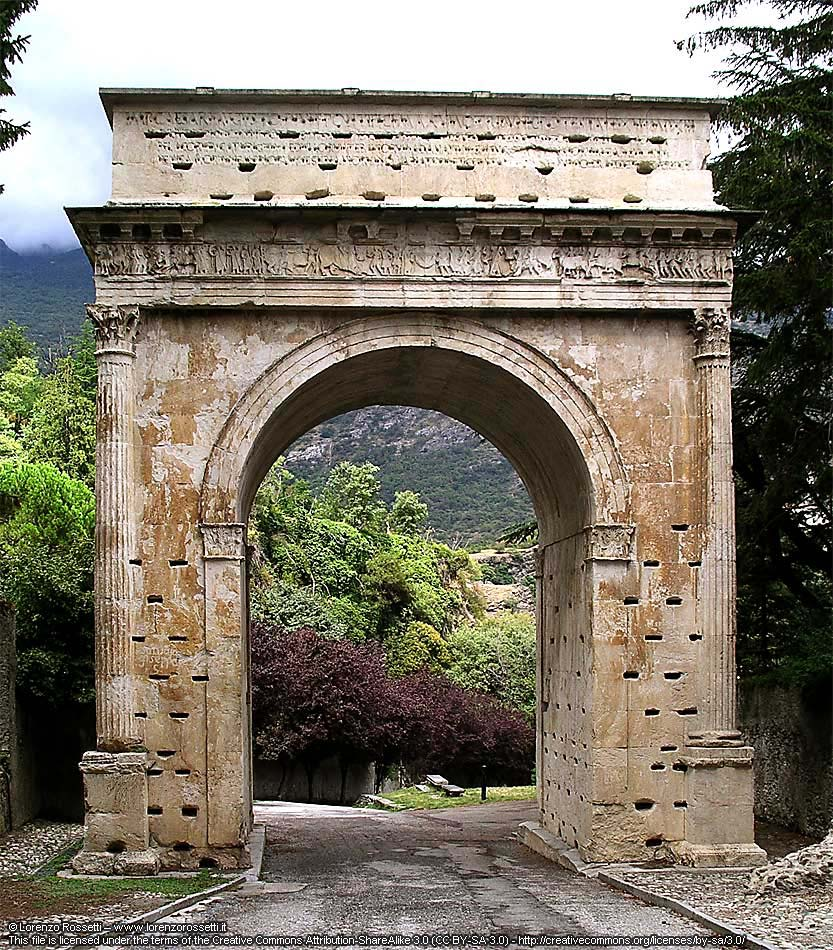
Triumphal arch dedicated to Augustus at Susa, Piedmont, Italy. Erected by Cottius, king of the Taurini, in 8 BC, to celebrate his appointment as Roman governor over the local Ligurian tribes of the Alpes Cottiae (which he had previously ruled as king)

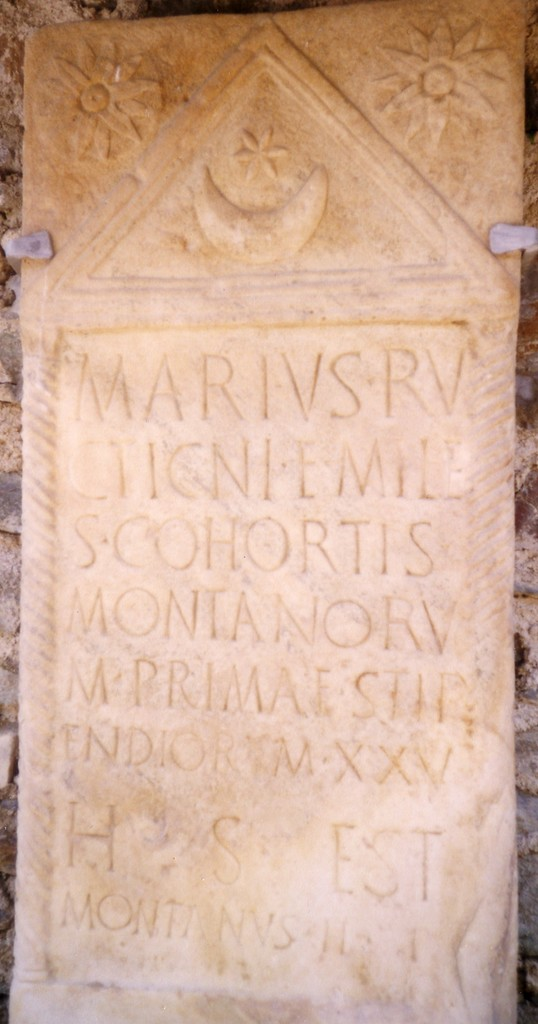
Tombstone of Marius son of Ructicnus. The inscription states that he was a miles (ranker) of the Alpine infantry regiment Cohors I Montanorum, who died in his 25th year of service (i.e. in the final year of the minimum term for an auxiliary and just before qualifying for Roman citizenship). His heir, who erected the stone, is named Montanus, the same ethnic name as the regiment's, meaning a native of the eastern Alps, most likely the origin of the deceased. Note (top corners) the Alpine edelweiss flowers, called stella Alpina ("Alpine star") in Latin. These were either a regimental symbol, or a national symbol of the Montani. The crescent moon-and-star motif between the flowers may be either a regimental emblem or a religious symbol. Date: 1st century, probably ante 68. From Carinthia, Austria

In the period 25-14 BC, therefore, Augustus' generals subdued the entire Alpine region. In Augustus' own words: Alpes a regione ea, quae proxima est Hadriatico mari, ad Tuscum pacari feci, nullae genti bello per iniuriam inlato ("I pacified the Alps all the way from the Adriatic to the Tyrrhenian seas, without waging an unjust war on any tribe"). Although the latter claim is questionable, there is no doubt about the comprehensive and permanent nature of Augustus' subjugation of all the mountain tribes.

In 7 BC, Augustus erected the Tropaeum Alpium ("Victory Monument of the Alps") at La Turbie (Alpes-Maritimes, France) to commemorate his conquest of the Alps. The inscription on the monument, transcribed by Pliny the Elder, listed 45 Alpinae gentes devictae ("conquered Alpine tribes"), including the Raeti and Vindelici. However, the names of tribes in the eastern Alps are not included, leading to the suggestion that the subjugation of the latter was achieved with much less bloodshed.

==== Western Alps: Alpini and Ligures ====
The Alpinorum and Ligurum cohorts were originally raised from the many small tribes that inhabited the western Alps, i.e. the later provinces of Alpes Graiae, Alpes Cottiae Alpes Maritimae and the western part of Raetia. Alpini appears to be a generic term for natives of the northwestern Alps i.e. the western part of Raetia and the Alpes Graiae (those of the eastern Alps appear to be called Montani). Ligures in its broad sense included all the Ligurian peoples of NW Italy, SE Gaul and the western Alps, including inhabitants of the eponymous region of Liguria, which Augustus designated the IX regio (administrative district) of Italia. The latter, however, were by this time Roman citizens, and would have been recruited into the legions. The Ligurum cohorts, therefore, would have been recruited from the Alpine Ligures, who were peregrini (non-citizens) i.e. the inhabitants of the Alpes Cottiae and Alpes Maritimae.

Prominent among the Alpini were the Salassi, warlike mountaineers who controlled the valley of the Duria Bautica river (Dora Baltea river, Val d'Aosta, Italy) and the saltus Poeninus (Great St Bernard Pass - 2,473m). As the shortest route from Italy to Germania Superior province in the Upper Rhine region, this pass became strategically vital to the Romans after Julius Caesar' s conquest of Gaul was completed in 51 BC. After centuries of raiding the Po Valley and decades of exacting tolls and exorbitant prices for supplies from transient Roman troops and travelers, interspersed with brigandage, the Salassi were finally subjugated in 25 BC by Augustus' general Aulus Terentius Varro Murena. The latter deported and sold into temporary slavery 44,000 Salassi, probably most of the tribe. Their territory became the core of the Alpes Graiae province, set up by 7 BC, with a new Roman colony, Augusta Praetoria Salassorum (Aosta, Italy) as its capital. It was governed by a procurator of equestrian rank.

The Taurini controlled the main Roman route from Italy to Gaul through the western Alps, the Val di Susa to the Col de Montgenèvre (1,850m). The latter was accessible for a longer period in the year than the other western passes, due to its relatively low altitude. This was the most likely route followed by the Carthaginian general Hannibal when he led his army across the Alps in 218 BC. This area formed the Alpes Cottiae province, named after the local king Cottius, who initially resisted Augustus' imperialism but eventually submitted and became the emperor's ally and personal friend. His territory, together with that of the other Alpine tribes, was annexed to the Roman empire in 15 BC - although Cottius, and his son after him, were accorded the unusual privilege of continuing to govern the region, with the title of praefectus i.e. Roman governor. In 8 BC, Cottius showed his gratitude for this reprieve from dynastic oblivion by erecting a triumphal arch to Augustus in his capital, Segusio (Susa, Piedmont, Italy), which still stands. After the death of Cottius' son, the emperor Nero (ruled 54–68) appointed a regular equestrian procurator to govern the province.

The subjugation of the coastal Ligures and the annexation of the Alpes Maritimae took place in 14 BC, closely following the occupation of the central Alps in 15 BC (see below).

==== Central Alps: Raeti and Vindelici ====
The Raetorum and Vindelicorum cohorts were originally composed of Raeti, a collective name given to a group of central Alpine tribes, which occupied southern Switzerland and the Tyrol and of their neighbours to the North, the Vindelici. The Raeti, according to Pliny the Elder, were Etruscans driven into the Alps from the Po Valley by invading Gauls. Prior to Roman annexation, their territory comprised central and SW Switzerland and North and South Tyrol. According to Livy, their original Etruscan culture had been lost as a result of living in the harsh Alpine environment (as opposed to the plains of the Po). During the centuries of Roman rule, the Raeti became Latin speakers, as evidenced by the survival of Romansh, a modern Romance language, in a small part of the Raeti's ancestral homeland (most of which is today German-speaking).

The Vindelici occupied the northern part of Raetia (i.e. Germany south of the river Danube) and whose chief town was Augusta Vindelicorum (Augsburg, Ger). The Vindelici were a probably a Celtic-speaking people as their name and those of affiliated tribes have convincing Celtic derivations. (Note: Etymology of Vindelici names: The name Vindelici probably derives from Celtic root vindo- ("bright"). In addition, Strabo lists 5 other tribes as affiliated to the Vindelici. All but one have plausible Celtic origins: Licates, from licco- ("rock"); Catenates, from catu- ("fight" or "armed host"); Vennones from veno- ("kinsmen"); and Brigantii, from brig- ("hillfort") or brigant- ("exalted ones").) They were described by the Roman geographer Strabo as a fierce people that frequently raided their neighbours and routinely put all male captives to death.

Both the Raeti and Vindelici were subdued by Augustus' stepsons and senior military commanders Tiberius and Drusus in a single campaign in 15 BC. The region was garrisoned, on its western edge, by at least one Roman legion at Vindonissa from c. AD 15 until c. 100 AD (in today's canton Aargau). In addition, auxiliary forces and leves armaturae ("light troops", probably a local militia) were stationed there. But these forces were mainly for security against external threats, not internal unrest. Strabo reports that the Alpine tribes as a whole adapted easily to Roman rule and did not rebel after the initial conquest. The Raeti and Vindelici were obliged to pay taxes to Rome. But it was not, apparently, organised as a full Roman province initially, but as a military canton under an equestrian officer. The latter, presumably reporting to the governor of Germania Superior, is attested in 2 inscriptions as "prefect (or procurator) of the Raeti, Vindelici and the Poenine Valley". It was apparently not before emperor Claudius (ruled 41–54), that the district became a full province with the official name of Raetia et Vindelicia (shortened to simply Raetia in the later 1st century), while the Poenine Valley (Canton Valais, Switz.) was separated to join the Alpes Graiae. Raetia was governed by an equestrian procurator.

==== Eastern Alps: Norici and Montani ====
Noricorum units were named after the Norici, which was either the name of a single tribe that became generalised to denote all the tribes in the eastern (Julian) Alps or, according to Pliny the Elder, an alternative name for the most prominent of these tribes, the Taurisci, a Celtic-speaking tribe (not to be confused with the Taurini on the other side of the Alps). Strabo reports that the Norici, in common with the Vindelici, frequently raided their neighbours and killed all their male-born captives.

From 200 BC onwards, it appears that the tribes of Noricum were gradually united in a native kingdom, known to the Romans as the regnum Noricum, with its capital at an uncertain location called Noreia. The kingdom was in reality a loose confederation whose main purpose was military defence. The Norici are first mentioned by the ancient writer Polybius (c. 130 BC). In 186 BC occurred the Norici's first recorded interaction with Rome. A group of Galli transalpini (believed to be Norici) appeared in Cisalpine Gaul (northern Italy). The intruders set about building an oppidum (hillfort) near the site of the future Roman colony of Aquileia (NE Italy), in the territory of the Veneti, who were Roman allies. The Romans, who by this time considered Cisalpine Gaul their own sphere of influence, immediately despatched envoys to protest. When this diplomacy did not have the desired effect, the Romans despatched two armies to the region. The Norici backed down, surrendering to the Romans without a fight. They were obliged to hand over their weapons and to return home. Their oppidum was razed to the ground.

For the 200 years between this stand-off and the time of Augustus, relations between Rome and the regnum Noricum were peaceful and marked by increasing cooperation in security and trade. The Romans saw the regnum as a useful buffer-state covering Italy's northeastern flank and a critical source of raw minerals and, above all, of Noric steel. The Norici saw the Romans as potential protectors in the event of major invasion by the powerful Germanic peoples across the Danube. Although there was no formal treaty of military alliance, the Norici could count on Roman military support, as demonstrated in 113 BC, when a vast host of Teutones invaded Noricum. In response to a desperate appeal by the Norici, the Roman consul Gnaeus Papirius Carbo rushed an army to the Alps and attacked the Germans near Noreia (although, in the event, he was heavily defeated). After finally crushing the Teutones in 101 BC, the Romans established a major trading colony within the leading Noric oppidum on the Magdalensberg (Carinthia, Austria), which may have been the site of Noreia. At the same time, the royal house and nobility of the regnum grew wealthy on the proceeds of the same exports. The increasing wealth and Romanisation of the regnum is demonstrated by the launch of its own coinage around 60 BC.

The long record of friendly relations between Rome and the regnum was broken in 16 BC, when the Norici invaded the Istrian peninsula, by then Roman territory. The reasons for this foray are unclear. The Norici may have been alarmed by, and/or taking advantage of, the imminent Roman operations against their Raetian neighbours. They were driven out of Istria by the proconsul of Illyricum, Publius Silius Nerva, to whom they submitted. Lack of inscription evidence for the Roman province of Noricum before Claudius has led to dispute about when Noricum was annexed. Some scholars hold that annexation immediately followed the Roman occupation in 16 BC. Others suggest that the regnum Noricum was allowed to remain in existence for c. 60 years as a Roman client-state, as was the Odrysian kingdom of Thrace, until both were annexed under Claudius. But even if the latter is true, there is a consensus that Roman troops were stationed in the regnum from 16 BC. After its organisation as a province, it was governed by an equestrian procurator.

The name of Montanorum cohorts derives from Montani (literally, "mountain people"), apparently a generic term for tribes inhabiting the eastern Alps, both from eastern Raetia and Noricum.

== The Alpine regiments ==
Two series of Alpinorum regiments were raised ante AD 37, 3 cohorts in the first, 4 in the second. 2 Ligurum cohorts were raised by Augustus and survived as amalgamated units after AD 70. 8 Raetorum cohorts existed by AD 54. A further 2 cohorts were raised after the civil war of 68–9. 4 Vindelicorum cohorts were operational by AD 68. 1 ala and 1 cohort of Norici were probably raised by Claudius (41-54). 2 Montanorum cohorts were levied by Augustus.

The following conclusions may be drawn from the Tables of Alpine regiments, below:

1. As mountain people, the Alpine tribes supplied predominantly infantry: all the regiments in this article are cohortes save for a single cavalry regiment, the ala Noricorum.
2. In total, some 20 regiments were raised from the Alpine provinces in the early Julio-Claudian era (i.e. ante 37). Of these, 6 were either destroyed in action or disbanded ante 68.
3. A further 6 units were raised under Claudius (41-54) and a couple under Vespasian (69-79).
4. Some 22 regiments with Alpine names survived into the early 2nd century, two of them amalgamated with other units and two renamed. Of these, 6 were still stationed in the Alpine provinces (Raetia or Noricum) or in the neighbouring Germania Superior. The rest were stationed in far-flung parts of the empire (including Cappadocia, Mauretania and Britannia), and would, by this time, probably have lost their ethnic identity through local recruitment.
5. At least 14 regiments survived into the early 3rd century although the evidence for that period is so limited that the possibility cannot be excluded that several more regiments also survived to that time.
6. The names of 4 Alpine regiments appear in the Notitia Dignitatum, a Roman government manual which includes all the military commands of the late Roman army, dating to around AD 400. 2 of these, the cohortes I and VI Raetorum, were based in their original home province of Raetia. The other two were based in the East.

Table 1: TRES ALPES REGIMENTS: Summary of available evidence
Regiment	Period founded	Earliest record	Latest record	Provinces deployed (minimum periods)	Forts occupied	Notes
Cohors I Alpinorum peditata	Augustus/Tiberius (ante 37)	80	c. 210	Pannonia Superior 80–167; Dacia Superior 179; Pannonia c. 210	PS: Poetovio/Carnuntum (to 107); Lussonium (107-67); Mursa (167-79)	
Cohors I Alpinorum equitata	Augustus/Tib (ante 37)	60	c. 215	Illyricum 60; Pannonia Inferior 80–143; Dacia Superior 144; Pann Inf 148 - c. 215	PI:Carnuntum; Szazholombatta; DCS: Apulum (144); PS: Mursa (c. 215)	There were 2 cohorts of this name & no., acc. to Holder
Cohors II Alpina	Augustus/Tiberius			Germania Superior ante 68		Single inscription pre-68. May have changed name to II ALPINORUM EQ
Cohors II Alpinorum equitata	Augustus/Tib (ante 37)	60	223-35	Illyricum 60; Pannonia Superior 84-223	PS: Mursa; Baratsföldpuszta; Dunaubogdány (185, 223)	
Cohors III Alpinorum equitata	Augustus/Tib (ante 37)	75	216-21	Dalmatia 75-216; [Not. Dig. Arabia 395]	D: Humac; Burnum; Salona; Muć; PS: Baratsföldpuszta.	
XXX
Cohors I Ligurum et Hispanorum	Augustus (ante 14)	1st century	134	Alpes Maritimae 1st century; Germania Superior 116-34	AM: Cimiez (1st century); GS: Niedenberg (early 2nd century)	Was I LIGURUM until merged with a Spanish unit after AD 70.
Cohors II gemina Ligurum et Corsorum	Augustus (ante 14)	88	153	Sardinia 88–96; Syria 153		Was II LIGURUM until merged with a Corsican unit after AD 70.

Table 2: RAETIAN REGIMENTS: Summary of available evidence
Regiment name	Period founded	Earliest record	Latest record	Provinces deployed (minimum periods)	Forts occupied	Notes
Cohors Raetorum	Augustus (ante 14)			Germania Superior ante 68		Single undatable inscription. Probably destroyed in action or disbanded ante 68.
Cohors Raetorum et Vindelicorum	Augustus (ante 14)			Germania Superior ante 68		Single undatable inscription. Probably destroyed in action or disbanded ante 68.
Cohors I Raetorum	Augustus/Tib (ante 37)	107	166	Raetia 107-66 [Not. Dig.: I Herculia Raetorum, Raetia c. 420]	R: Schierenhof	Distinct unit ac. to Holder. Same unit as I RAETORUM EQ. CR. ac. to Spaul.
Cohors I Raetorum equitata	Vespasian (69-79)	75	Gordian III (238-44)	Moesia 75; Cappadocia 135–8; Asia 148-240	C: Eumenia	Distinct unit ac. to Holder. Same unit as I RAETORUM EQ. CR. ac. to Spaul.
Cohors I Raetorum eq. c.R.	Vespasian (69-79)	98	138-61 (Antoninus)	Germania Inferior 98-138	GI: Remagen	
Cohors II Raetorum	Augustus/Tib (ante 37)	107	166	Raetia 107-66	R: Straubing	
Cohors II Raetorum c.R.	Augustus/Tib (ante 37)	82	222-35 (Alex. Severus)	Germania Superior 82-222	GS: ante 100:Mogontiacum, Worms post 100:Friedburg, Butzbach; Saalburg (210-35)	Was II RAETORUM ET VINDELICORUM until renamed after c. 100.
Cohors IV Raetorum equitata	Augustus/Tib (ante 37)	94	180	Moesia Sup 94–100; Cappadocia 130-8; Mauretania 180; [Not. Dig. Armenia 395]	MAUR C:Timgad 180	
Cohors V Raetorum	Augustus/Tib (ante 37)	118	122	Moesia? ante 122; Britannia 118		
Cohors VI Raetorum	Augustus/Tib (ante 37)	98	166-9	Germania Inferior 98–127; Britannia 166 [Not. Dig.: VI Valeria Raetorum, Raetia c. 420]	BRIT: Great Chesters (166)	
Cohors VII Raetorum equitata	Augustus/Tib (ante 37)	38	212-22	Raetia 38; Germania Sup 74-212	R: Vindonissa 38; GS: Confluentes; Königsfelden; Niederberg (212-22)	
Cohors VIII Raetorum equitata c.R.	Augustus/Tib (ante 37)	80	179	Pannonia 80–102; Moesia Sup 103–7; Dacia Superior 109-79	DCS: Inlaceni?	
XXX
Cohors I Vindelicorum equitata milliaria c.R.	Julio-Claudian (ante 68)	100	208-12	Germania Inferior ante 100; Moesia Superior 100–9; Dacia Superior 110-208	GI: Colonia Agrippina MS: Varadia. DCS: Tibiscum (c. 211); Veczel (c. 211)	
Cohors IV Vindelicorum	Julio-Claudian (ante 68)	74	3rd century	Germ. Superior 74–116; Maur. Tingitana 124; Germ. Superior 134 - 3rd c.; Dacia early 3rd c.-	GS: Arzbach, Heddernheim (2nd century); Grosskrotzenburg (3rd century); Cumidava	

NOTE TO TABLE 2: The following cohorts can be inferred from the numeration, but are unattested: III RAETORUM, II and III VINDELICORUM. All were evidently disbanded or destroyed in action in the early 1st century.

Table 3: NORICUM REGIMENTS: Summary of available evidence
Regiment name	Period founded	Earliest record	Latest record	Provinces deployed (minimum periods)	Forts occupied	Notes
Ala Noricorum	Claudius/Nero (54-68)	78	160-7	Germania Superior ante c. 70 AD; Germania Inferior 70-160	GS: Moguntiacum (to 70 AD); GI: Colonia Agrippina; Burgunatium (Kalkar); Burungum (Worringen) (160-7)	
Cohors I Noricorum equitata	Claudius/Nero (54-68)	c. 40	post 240-4	Pannonia 40-105; Pannonia Inferior 85-244	PI: Ocseny; Dunaszekcso (215-40)	Only attested as equitata in early 3rd century. Awarded title of Gordiana by emperor Gordian III (240-4).
Cohors I Montanorum	Augustus (ante 14)	80	178-203	Pannonia 80-102; Pannonia Inferior 102-78		Was the same unit as I MONTANORUM C.R. according to some scholars, but Holder and Spaul agree that the two were separate units.
Cohors I Montanorum c.R.	Augustus (ante 14)	85	197-211?	Pannonia 85–98; Moesia Superior 98–103; Dacia 109–33; Syria Palaestina 133–59; Moesia Superior 159 - early 3rd century	MS: Cezava (98); Ravna (98-103); Pristina (197-211)	Probably took part in the Conquest of Dacia (102-5) and in the suppression of the Second Jewish revolt in 132-5
Cohors II Montanorum milliaria						Single undatable inscription. May be one of the I MONTANORUM units after a number change or a merger of both I MONTANORUM units.

== Explanation of Table rubrics ==
=== Ethnic origin of regiment ===
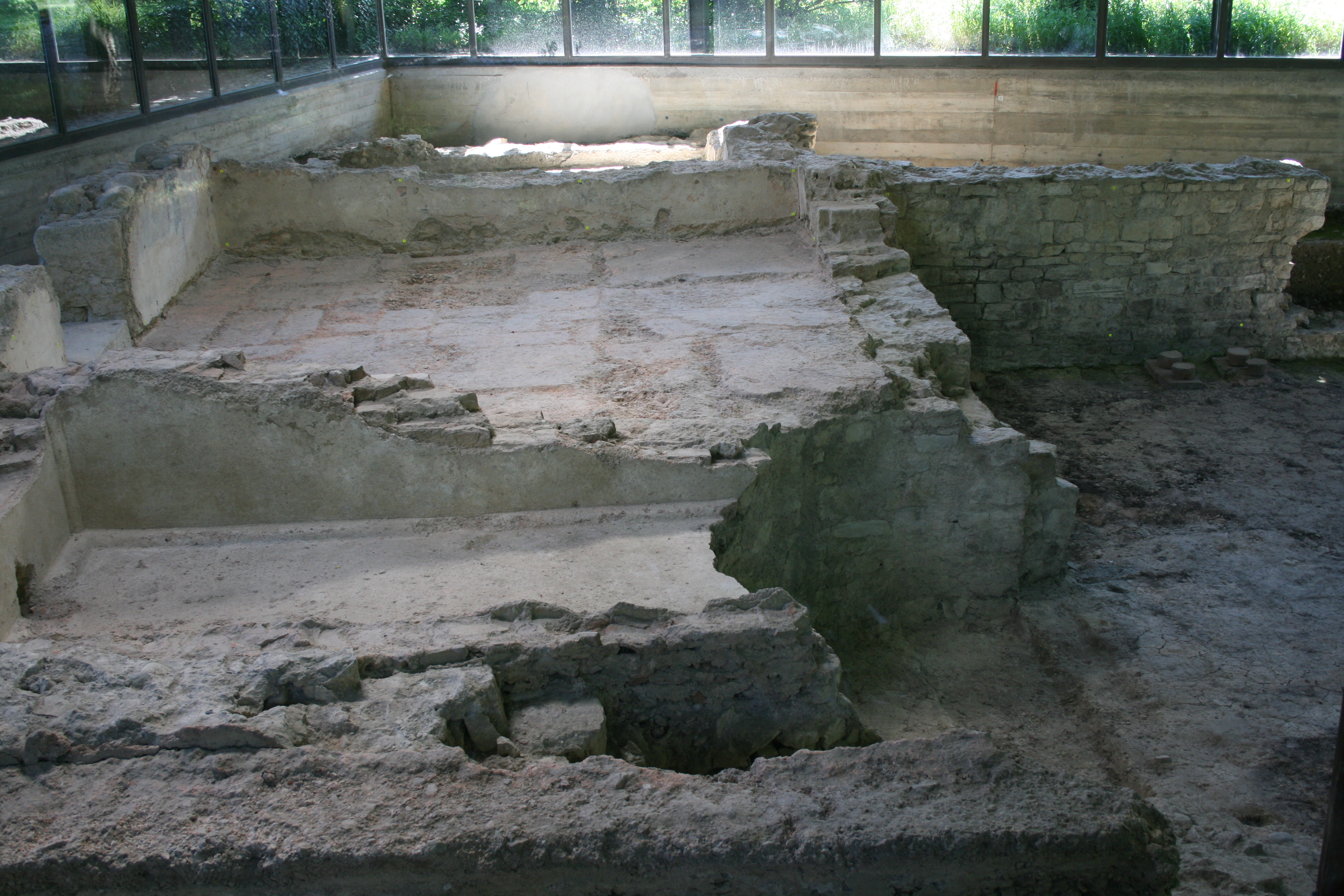
Remains of the thermae (bathhouse) of the legionary fortress at Vindonissa (Windisch, Canton Aargau, Switz.). Vindonissa (in or just outside Raetia) was the base of at least one Roman legion in the period 15 - 100 AD

During the early Julio-Claudian period (Augustus/Tiberius, 30 BC to AD 37), the available evidence suggests that auxiliary regiments were predominantly recruited from their original home province, maintaining the ethnic identity of the unit. In the later Julio-Claudian period (37-68), regimental recruitment appears to become more mixed, with home recruits balanced by an increase in local recruits from the province in which the unit was stationed and also levies from the main recruiting areas of Gallia Belgica, Pannonia and Thrace. Finally, after AD 70, recruitment in loco generally becomes predominant. For example, the cohors V Raetorum recorded as stationed in Britain in 122 would probably have contained mainly British recruits by that time, and very few, if any, Raeti. Conversely, the several "British" regiments stationed in Dacia in mid 2nd century would probably have been recruited mainly from the Danubian provinces by that time, although there is some evidence of continued recruitment of Britons. Only those regiments that remained stationed in or near their eponymous province probably retained their original ethnic identity after AD 100 i.e.. only 6 of the 22 Alpine regiments. Against that, there is evidence that at least a few regiments maintained special links with their original home province and recruited preferentially from it into the 2nd century e.g. Batavi units stationed in Britain.

=== Regiment name ===
Only regiments for which inscription evidence exists are entered. Regiments whose existence can be inferred from sequence gaps, but are not attested in the epigraphic record, are not included. Cohorts whose name was changed are entered under their latest name (their old name is entered as a quondam).

Most regiments carried a number and a name (normally a peregrini tribal name in the genitive plural case) e.g. cohors I Raetorum (lit. "1st cohort of Raeti"). A few regiments had no number. A confusing aspect of auxiliary unit nomenclature is that in some cases, more than one regiment can appear in the record with the same number and name e.g. there are two I Raetorum units attested in the 2nd century. In a few cases there is dispute as to whether it really is two distinct regiments, as opposed to the same regiment moving from one province to another or two detachments of the same regiment in different provinces at the same time. But in most cases, there is no doubt two separate regiments are involved. They can usually be distinguished by whether one is equitata or not, or has a c.R. title or not e.g. I Raetorum and I Raetorum c.R. The explanation for duplicated names is that where more than one series of cohorts was raised from the same original tribe, numbering would start from 1 again, especially if the second series was raised by a different emperor.

There were three basic types of auxiliary regiment. (1) an ala (literally "wing") was a purely cavalry regiment of 480 horse. (2) a cohors ("cohort") was a purely infantry regiment of 480 foot. (3) a cohors equitata was a cohors with a cavalry contingent attached: 480 infantry plus 120 cavalry for a total of 600 men.

A minority of regiments were denoted milliaria, which meant they were nominally double-strength. In practice, they contained 720 (or 768) men for an ala milliaria, 800 for a cohors milliaria and 1,040 (800 inf/240 cav) for a cohors equitata milliaria. Milliaria units were only introduced sometime after AD 81, either by doubling the strength of existing units or by raising new ones. In addition, some regiments were denoted sagittaria (from sagitta, "arrow") meaning they contained a much higher number of archers than ordinary regiments.

The honorific title civium Romanorum ("of Roman citizens", c.R. for short) was normally awarded by the emperor for valour to an auxiliary regiment as a whole. The award would include the grant of Roman citizenship to all the regiment's current members, but not to subsequent recruits to the regiment. The regiment, however, would retain the prestigious title in perpetuity. Until 212, only a minority of the empire's inhabitants (inc. all Italians) held full Roman citizenship. The rest were denoted peregrini, a second-class status. Since the legions admitted only citizens, peregrini could only enlist in the auxilia. Citizenship carried a number of tax and other privileges and was highly sought after. It could also be earned by serving the minimum 25-year term in the auxilia. In 212 all free inhabitants of the empire were granted full Roman citizenship.

=== Period founded ===
This is in most cases conjectural, as most auxiliary regiments were founded in the Julio-Claudian era (ante 68), while the vast majority of datable auxiliary records date from the Flavian era onwards (post 70), and of these most from the 2nd century. However, the foundation period can be inferred from other evidence e.g. numeration sequence e.g. Cohors VII Raetorum is attested in the year 38 AD. From this it can be inferred that all the Raetorum cohorts with a lower number than VII were also in existence by that date, and so were almost certainly founded in the Augustus/Tiberius period.

=== Records ===
This gives the earliest and latest datable record for each regiment.

The literary evidence for auxiliary regiments is almost non-existent. Unlike for the legions, ancient Roman historians only rarely mention the auxilia at all, and never denote a specific unit. Knowledge of the auxilia is therefore dependent on inscriptions found bearing the regiment's name. Many of these are not datable (even roughly) and so are of limited value. The datable epigraphic record is thus very patchy and incomplete.

The epigraphic record includes: (1) inscriptions from Roman military diplomas, which were bronze certificates of Roman citizenship awarded to peregrini soldiers who completed the minimum 25 years' service in the auxilia: these are very useful as, if complete, they contain a precise date and the province in which the regiment was serving at the time (as well the name, origin and rank of the recipient). (2) tiles or bricks, used in building work on Roman forts, stamped with the regiment's name. These show the forts where a regiment may have been based, but are rarely datable. (3) votive stone altars or tablets, and tombstones. These can indicate the addressee's origin if they are found in provinces away from the regiment's base. A minority are datable.

A final and unique record is the Notitia Dignitatum, dating to c. 400, which is a Roman government manual detailing all the military commands of the late Roman army. Although the great majority of units listed do not have Principate-era names, some 60 of the latter are survive, mostly limitanei (frontier units). In the tables above, a regiment whose name appears in this document is qualified by Not. Dig. in brackets. Regiments in 400 AD were very different from those of the Principate. They were probably much smaller (frontier cohorts may have as small as 50-strong) and their armour and weapons may have differed significantly from their forebears'.

=== Provinces deployed ===
Auxiliary regiments were mostly stationed in one province long-term, although there could be short-term re-deployments to suit operational requirements. During the early Julio-Claudian era, regiments were often stationed in their native or neighbouring provinces, The Flavian era (69-96) saw a lot of changes in auxiliary deployment in what appears a deliberate policy of deploying regiments away from their original home province. After that, deployments generally became much more settled, with most units remaining in the same province throughout the 2nd and 3rd centuries.

The tables display the available evidence for each regiment. The provinces deployed rubric gives the minimum dates that the regiment was based in a province, but it may have been there much longer. The datable epigraphic record is very incomplete. For example, most of the regiments below are believed by inference to have been established before 37 AD, but only one is actually attested at that time, with the rest not attested before 75.

=== Forts garrisoned ===
Auxiliary regiments were normally attached, for operational purposes, to a particular legion. The praefectus (commander) of the regiment would report to the legatus legionis (legion commander). Auxiliary regiments were mostly housed in Roman forts in frontier provinces or even beyond the empire's settled borders, to keep watch on barbarian activity. A regiment would usually garrison a fort alone, but sometimes shared with another regiment if it was a larger fort. More rarely, regiments appear to have been housed in the castra legionaria (legionary fortress) of the legion they were attached to. Although inscriptions, especially the regiment's tile- and brick-stamps, can attest which forts the regiment occupied, most are not datable and so it is rarely possible to reconstruct a precise sequence or chronology of forts occupied.

== See also ==
- Alpinorum auxiliary regiments

== See also ==
- Auxiliaries (Roman military)
- List of Roman auxiliary regiments
