= Gallic Alps =

Ancient cultural region

The Gallic Alps (Latin: Alpibus Gallicanis) were an ancient cultural region located in the Alps and populated mainly by Gauls. The term Celtic Alps is also found in ancient Greek texts.

The Romans distinguished the following chains in the Alps: Alpes Maritimae (Maritime Alps), Alpes Cottiae (Cottian Alps), Alpes Graiae (Graian Alps), Alpes Poeninae (Pennine Alps), Alpes Raeticae (Rhaetian Alps), Alpes Noricae (Noric Alps), Alpes Carnicae (Carnic Alps), and Alpes Venetae (Venetian Prealps). They also gave the name of Alpes to the Austrian (Austrian Central Alps) and Dalmatian mountains (Dinaric Alps).

== History ==
After the Roman conquest of the Western Alps (16–15 BC), three provinces were created in the mountain range between Italy and Gallia Narbonensis: Alpes Cottiae, Alpes Maritimae, and Alpes Graiae et Poeninae.

== See also ==
- Gallia Cisalpina
- Gallia Transalpina, later renamed Gallia Narbonensis
- Gallia Celtica
- Gallia Belgica
- Gallia Aquitania
