= Tres Alpes =

Group of three Roman provinces situated in the Alps

The Roman Empire in the time of Hadrian (ruled 117–38 AD), showing, in the western Alps mountain range, the Tres Alpes, the provinces of Alpes Graiae (1), Alpes Cottiae (2) and Alpes Maritimae (3)

Tres Alpes (literally, "Three Alps"), was the collective term used by the Romans to denote three small provinces of the Roman Empire situated in the western Alps mountain range, namely Alpes Graiae (or Poeninae) (Val d'Aosta, Italy); Alpes Cottiae (Val di Susa, Italy); and Alpes Maritimae. The region was annexed by the Romans in 16–14 BC and the three provinces organised by 7 BC.

== History ==
Originally, due to the mountainous terrain, the annexation of this region was hard for the Romans to accomplish, but when the Roman Empire was beginning to increase in size, it was viewed as critical for the Emperor Augustus to conquer these territories believing they were strategically significant region connecting Italy to the rest of the Empire. From 16-7 BCE, he launched a series of campaigns to conquer the area. The region was named "Tres Alps" due to it being separated into three provinces in the Alps. The Roman victory of the campaigns was celebrated with the erection of Tropaeum Alpium. The provinces lasted until the Fall of the Western Roman Empire.

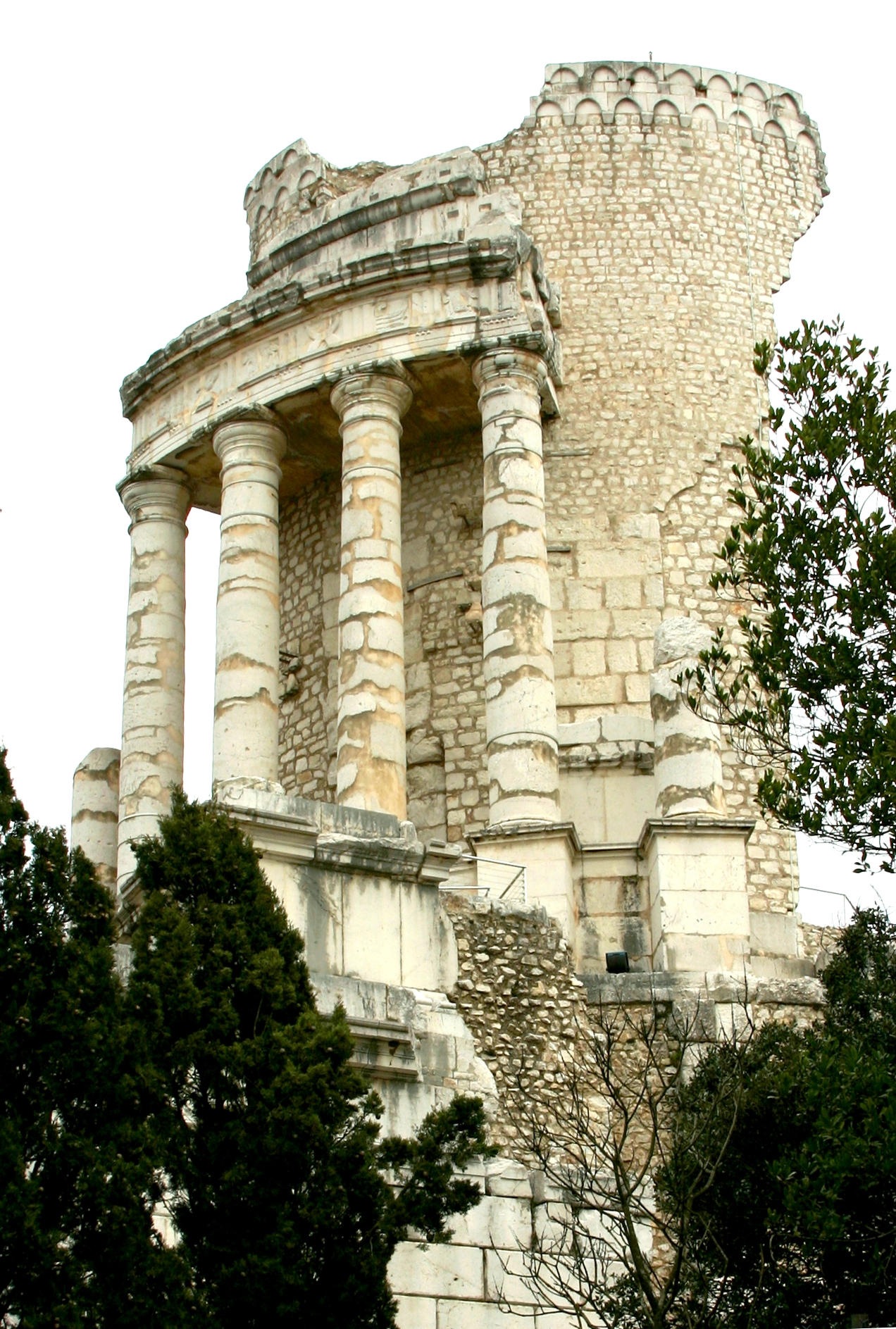
Picture of present-day Tropaeum Alpine

== Strategic Importance ==
Rather than being a source of great wealth or large population centers, these provinces acted as a defensive shield for the Italian peninsula and a gateway to the empire's provinces in Gaul and Germania. Controlling these territories ensured the security of a vast network of roads that funneled troops, trade goods, and imperial administrators between Rome and its northern frontiers. Without Roman authority securing the passes, the mountain tribes could have posed a significant threat to imperial order, either by disrupting commerce or launching raids into Italy. The successful pacification and incorporation of these provinces were critical steps in consolidating Roman power throughout the region. From a military perspective, the Tres Alpes were essential to maintaining Roman power and suppressing local threats. Before their formal conquest under Augustus, the Alpine passes were controlled by various tribes who would often extract heavy tolls or engage in brigandry, impeding Roman military and supply movements. The Romans established military installations and garrisons throughout the provinces to maintain order, secure the passes, and recruit local auxiliary troops who were well-adapted to mountain warfare. The stability provided by Roman rule eliminated the unpredictability of dealing with independent, hostile tribes and allowed for the smooth and safe movement of legions across the mountain range, an invaluable strategic advantage for a far-reaching empire.

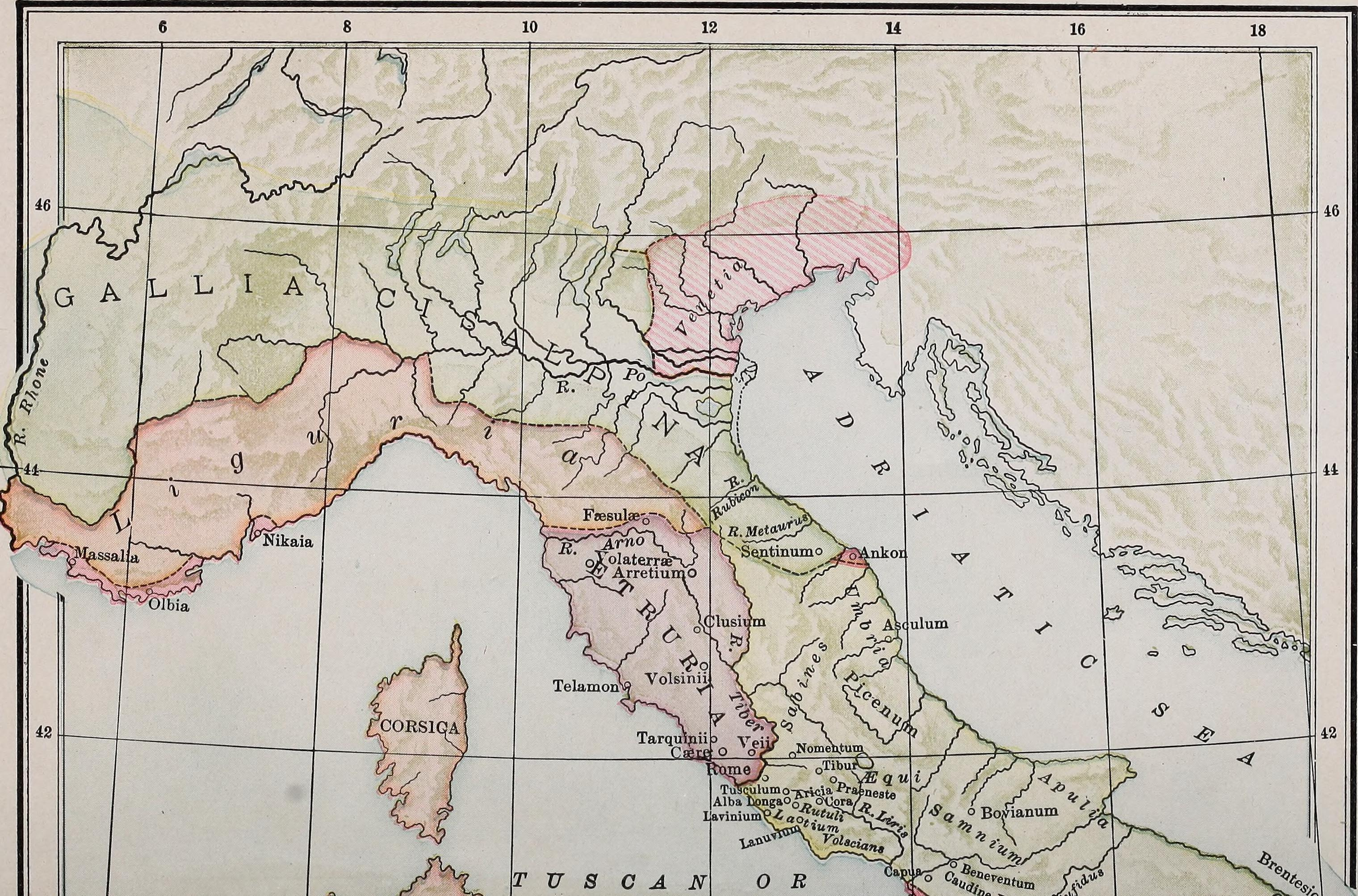
Map of the Roman conquered Alps

Economically, the provinces' importance lay in their function as a transit hub rather than as a center of production. The development and maintenance of Roman road networks, such as those crossing the Col de Montgenèvre and the Great St. Bernard Pass, were crucial for facilitating trade between the wealthy core of the empire in Italy and its western provinces. Controlling the passes ensured that goods like amber, wine, and other manufactured products could be transported safely and predictably, benefiting the Roman economy as a whole. Taxes and tolls levied on goods passing through the Alpine checkpoints also provided a steady stream of revenue for the empire. The stability created by Roman provincial administration allowed trade to flourish and further integrated the Alpine territories into the imperial economic system.

== See also ==
- Roman Empire
- Alpine regiments of the Roman army
