= Cottii Regnum =

Cottii Regnum was a small independent kingdom in northwestern Italy. It included most of an important road over the pass of Mont Genevre and Mont Cenis into Gaul. The pass was in use by about 100 BC.

In 58 BC, Julius Caesar met with some resistance on crossing it, but seems afterwards to have entered into friendly relations with Donnus, the king of the district; he must have used it frequently, and referred to it as the shortest route. Donnus's son Cottius erected the triumphal arch at his capital Segusio, the modern Susa, in honour of Augustus.

The kingdom was included in the Roman Empire under Nero about AD 64, when it became a province under the title of "Alpes Cottiae," being governed by a procurator Augusti, though it still kept its old name also.
