= Cohors I Raetorum equitata =

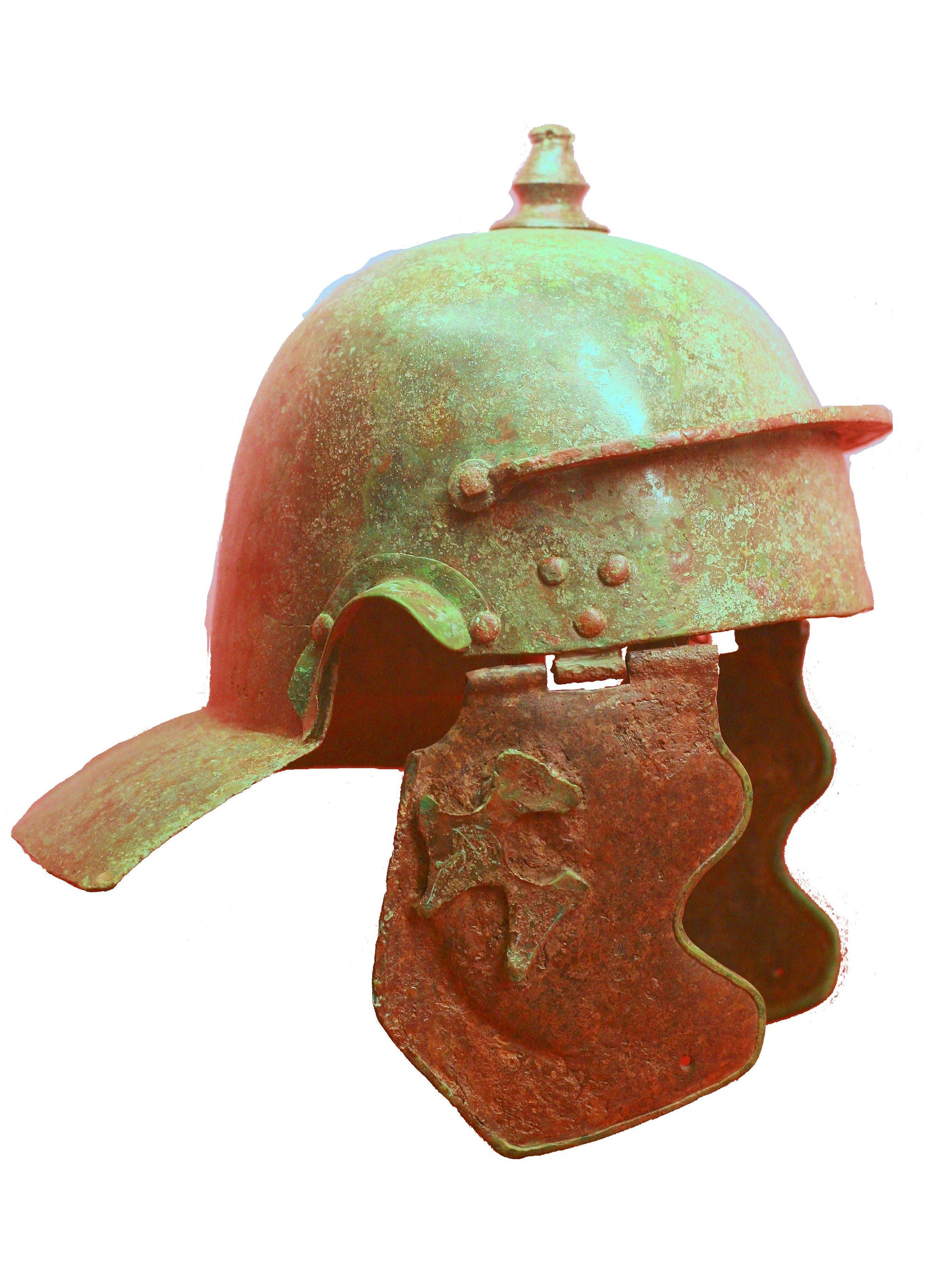
- Roman infantry helmet (late 1st century)
- Active: mid 1st century to at least mid-3rd century
- Country: Roman Empire
- Type: Roman auxiliary cohort
- Role: infantry/cavalry
- Size: 600 men (480 infantry, 120 cavalry)
- Garrison/HQ: Moesia 75; Cappadocia 135; Asia 148-240

Cohors prima Raetorum equitata ("1st part-mounted Cohort of Raeti") was a Roman auxiliary mixed infantry and cavalry regiment. It is named after the Raeti nation, which dominated the eponymous province Raetia, which comprised much of modern Switzerland and Germany south of the river Danube. The Raeti originally spoke a non Indo-European language closely related to Etruscan. However, by the time their territory was annexed by Rome under founder-emperor Augustus (16 BC), they had become largely Celtic-speaking through contact with neighbouring peoples such as the Vindelici. Finally, during the centuries of Roman rule, they became Latin speakers: their distinctive provincial patois survives today in the form of the Rhaeto-Romance languages.

According to Holder, a total of 12 Raetorum cohortes appear to have been raised, 10 of them not later than the rule of Claudius (41-54) and 2 shortly after 70 AD. But there is dispute about how many regiments survived into the 2nd century. This is due to confusion about how many regiments shared the name I Raetorum because the name is attested in three provinces in roughly the same periods. It has been suggested there were as many as three such regiments in the 2nd century in Cappadocia, Raetia and Germania Inferior. Holder appears to follow this. Spaul suggests it was a single unit, I Raetorum equitata c.R., being moved about frequently. Here the 3-unit theory is followed. The c.R. title only appears in Germania Inferior so the unit there is called cohors I Raetorum equitata c.R. The unit in Cappadocia, the subject of this article, was also equitata, and so is denoted cohors I Raetorum equitata. The unit in Raetia is denoted simply cohors I Raetorum as there is no evidence it was equitata.

The regiment was probably raised shortly after 70 AD. It first appears in the datable epigraphic record in 75, when it was based in Moesia. Not later than 135 it was transferred to Cappadocia. In 135 it was part of the force deployed against an Alan invasion by the provincial governor and historian Arrian. It was then transferred, by 148, to Asia province. It was probably still there in 240-4, the time of its last datable inscription, a votive stone at Eumenia (Ishekli, Turkey). By this time it had acquired the honorific title Gordiana (from the emperor Gordian I r. 238).

== See also ==
- List of Roman auxiliary regiments
