= Cohors I Raetorum =

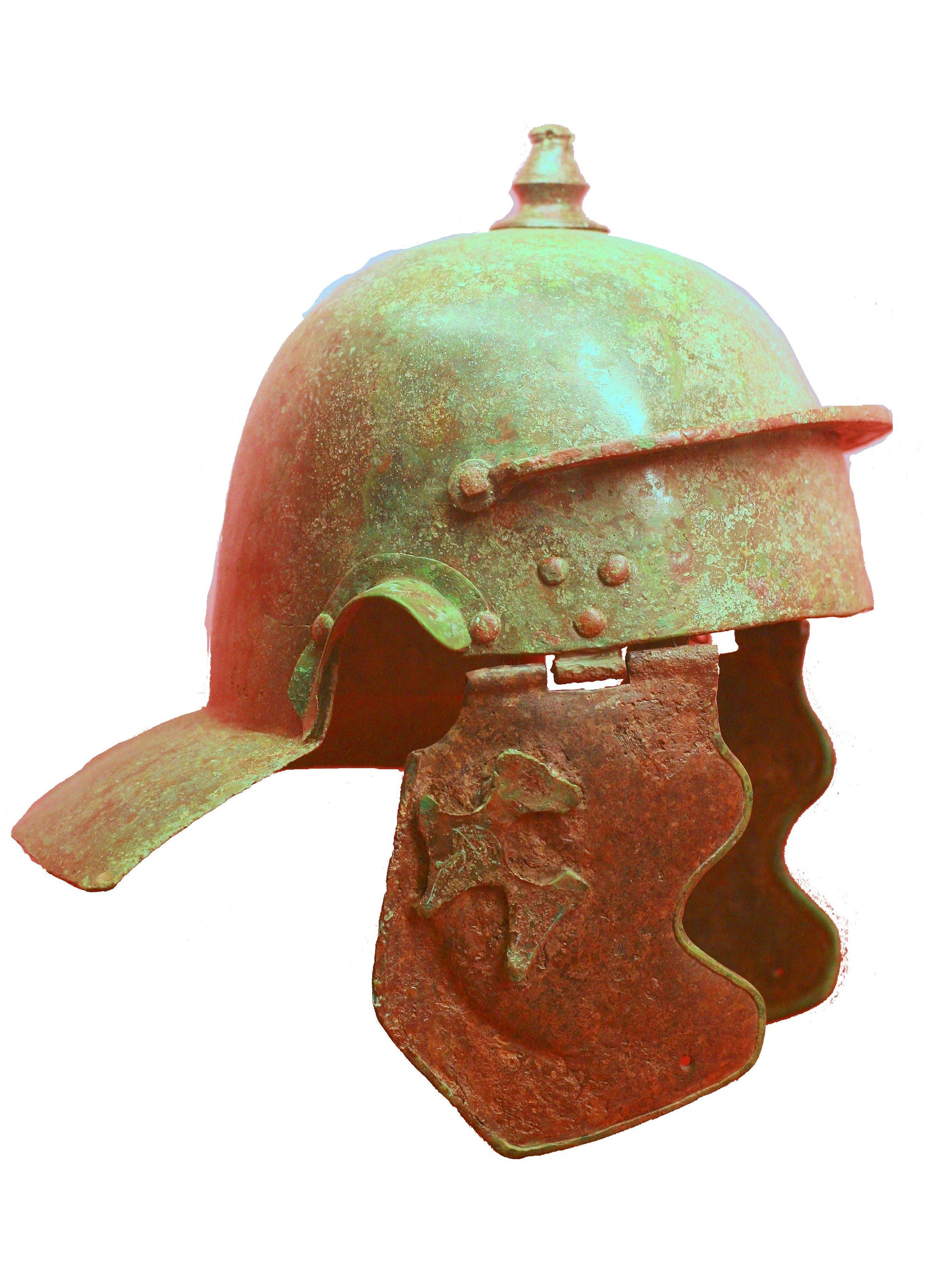
- Roman infantry helmet (late 1st century)
- Active: early 1st century to at least mid-2nd century
- Country: Roman Empire
- Type: Roman auxiliary cohort
- Role: infantry
- Size: 480 men
- Garrison/HQ: Raetia 107-166

Cohors prima Raetorum ("1st Cohort of Raeti") was a Roman auxiliary infantry regiment. It is named after the Raeti, a designation probably given to some Alpine tribes, which were part of the eponymous province Raetia et Vindelicum, later called simply Raetia. It comprised much of modern Switzerland, western Austria and Germany south of the river Danube. The Raeti originally spoke a non Indo-European language that seems related to Etruscan. However, by the time their territory was annexed by Rome under founder-emperor Augustus (16 BC), they had become largely Celtic-speaking through contact with neighbouring peoples such as the Vindelici. Finally, during the centuries of Roman rule, they became Latin speakers: their distinctive provincial patois survives today in the form of the Rhaeto-Romance languages.

According to Holder, a total of 12 Raetorum cohortes appear to have been raised, 10 of them not later than the rule of Claudius (41-54) and 2 shortly after 70 AD. But there is dispute about how many regiments survived into the 2nd century. This is due to confusion about how many regiments shared the name I Raetorum because the name is attested in three provinces in roughly the same periods. It has been suggested there were as many as 3 such regiments in the 2nd century in Cappadocia, Raetia and Germania Inferior. Holder appears to follow this. Spaul suggests it was a single unit, I Raetorum equitata c.R., being moved about frequently. Here the 3-unit theory is followed. The c.R. title only appears in Germania Inferior so the unit there is denoted cohors I Raetorum equitata c.R. The unit in Cappadocia was also equitata, and so is denoted cohors I Raetorum equitata. The unit in Raetia, the subject of this article, is denoted simply cohors I Raetorum as there is no evidence it was equitata.

The regiment was probably raised by founder-emperor Augustus (r. 30BC-14AD) after 15 BC. It was certainly in existence by the time of Claudius (r. 41-54). It first appears in the datable epigraphic record in 107, in its original home province, Raetia. It was still there in 166, the time of its last datable inscription. It is attested by an undatable tile stamp in the Roman fort at Schierenhof in Schwäbisch Gmünd (Gamundia Romana), which may have been one of its bases.

== See also ==
- List of Roman auxiliary regiments
- Raetorum cohorts
- Roman auxiliaries
