= Cottius =

- King and prefect of the Alpes Cottiae
- Issue: Gaius Julius Donnus II; Julius Vestalis
Names
- Marcus Julius Cottius
- Father: Donnus
- Religion: Paganism

Marcus Julius Cottius was King of the Celtic and Ligurian inhabitants of the mountainous ranges of the central Western Alps, then known as Alpes Taurinae (Taurine Alps). The region is now known as the Cottian Alps, renamed after him in the early in the 1st century BC. Son and successor to King Donnus, he negotiated a dependent status with Emperor Augustus that preserved considerable autonomy for his country, making him a Roman governor (præfectus civitatium), and received Roman citizenship.

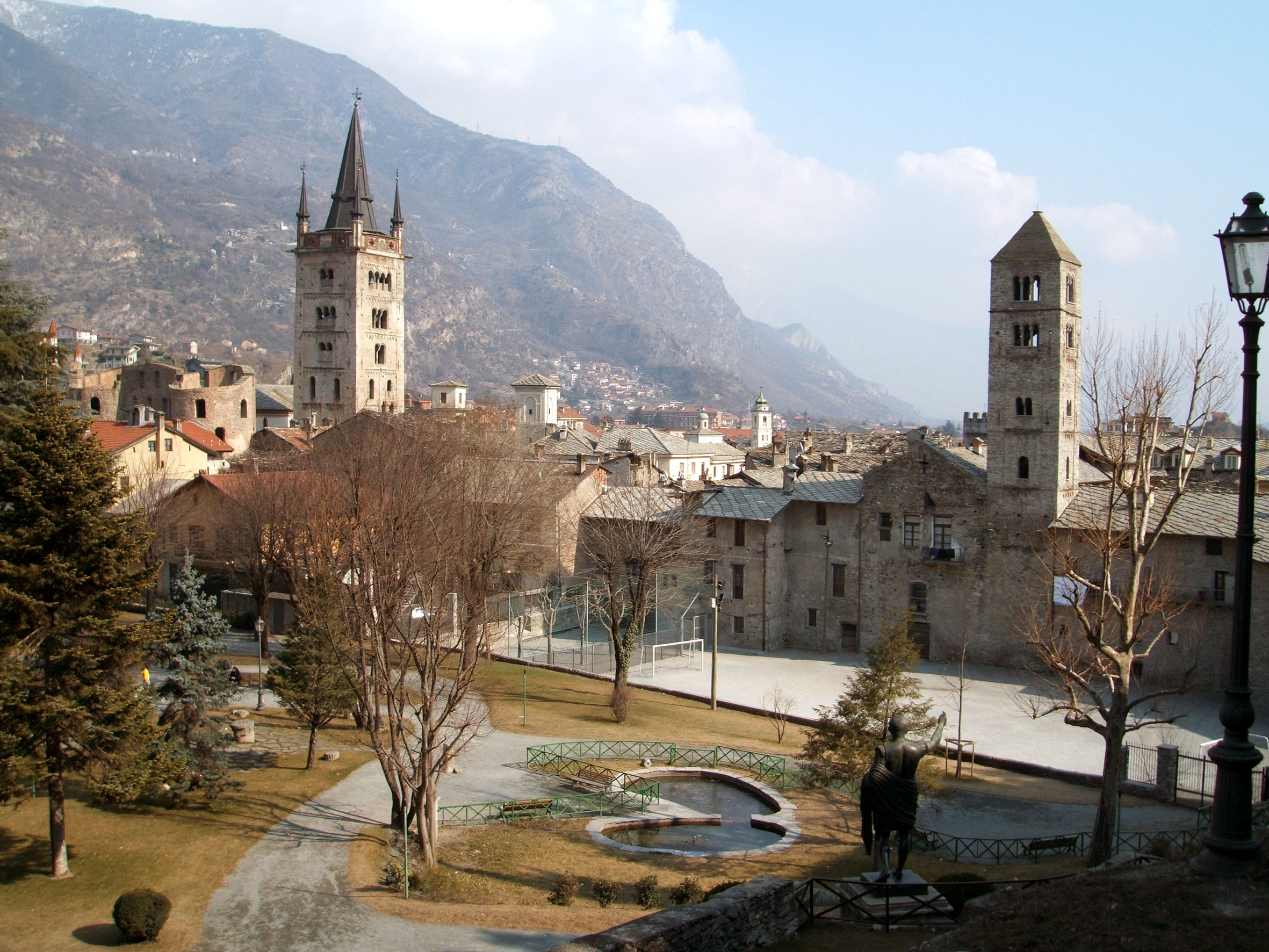
Susa, Piedmont, Italy, capital of the Kingdom of Marcus Julius Cottius

== Early relationship with Rome ==
The friendship between Cottius's realm and Rome goes back at least to the reign of his father King Donnus; there is numismatic evidence which suggests that Donnus established friendly relations with Julius Caesar. As Caesar needed to cross the Cottii Regnum in 58 BC on his way to Gaul, he made an agreement with King Donnus to have his troops transported on his road as well as having a new paved road being built. This road was the path most likely taken by General Hannibal when he crossed the Alps in 218 BC. During the civil wars which followed Caesar's death, many Gallic tribes rebelled. At the end of these wars Emperor Augustus took charge in Rome and suppressed the Gallic revolts. The destruction of the Salassi tribes and the subjugation of the Ligurian tribes in 14 BC must have convinced Cottius "to press the advantage and use his control of the Alpine passes as leverage for an alliance with Rome that would allow him to maintain his position". Ammianus Marcellinus, Roman soldier and historian, remarked that even after Gaul had been subdued, Cottius alone continued to rely on the strategic position his kingdom afforded him. The arrangement benefited both parties, as Augustus wanted to maintain good relations with the people who lived along the Montgenevre pass over the Alps, which was on the road to Gaul.

== Alliance with Rome ==
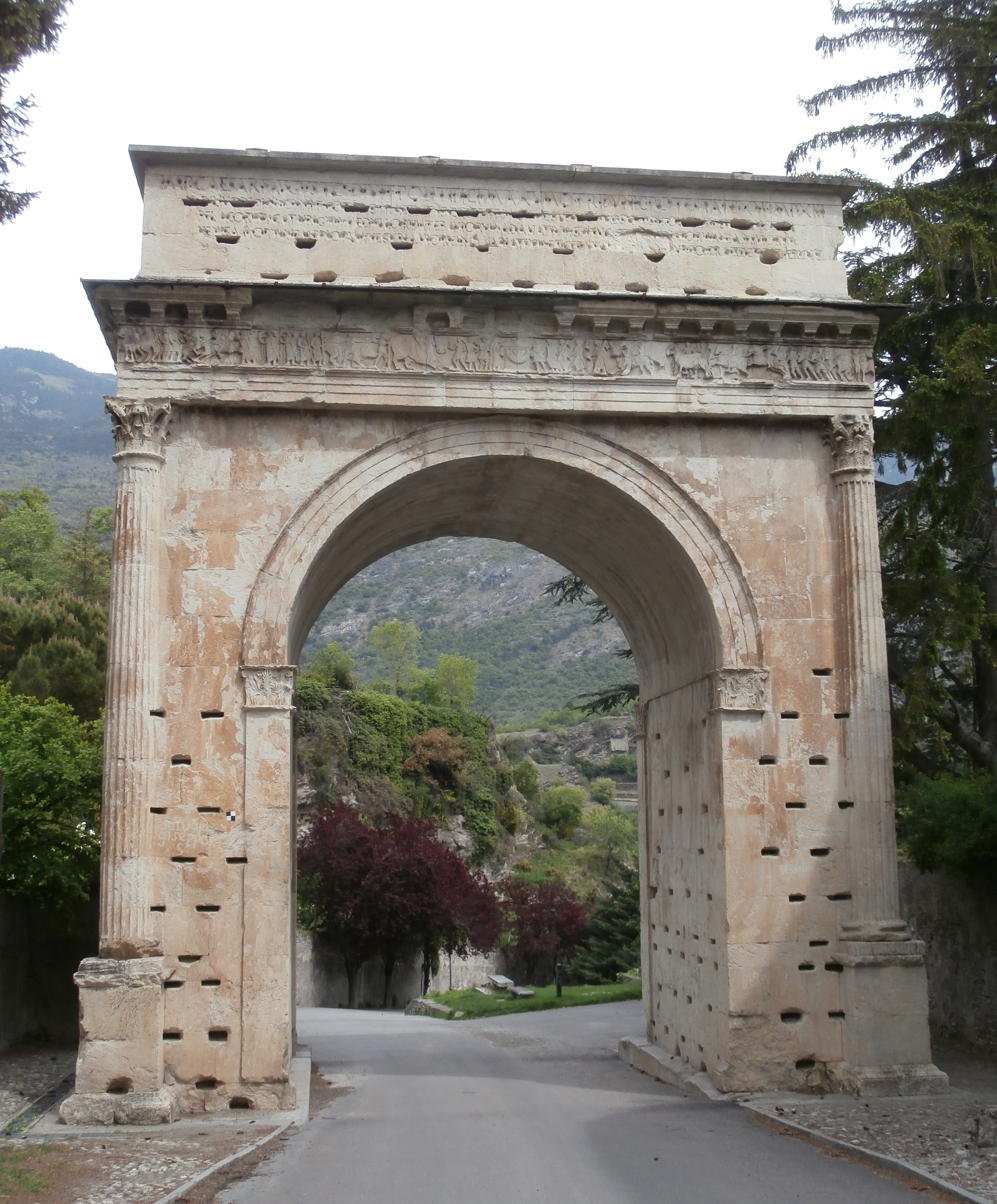
Arch of Augustus, Susa, Italy

The Roman alliance was established in 13 or 12 BC, and is attested in an inscription on the Arch of Susa, which was erected to commemorate this agreement between 9 and 8 AD. The Emperor Caesar Augustus attended its unveiling. By it Cottius became a client king of Rome, with his authority reduced in exchange of the retention of his autonomy. While deferring authority to Augustus, he continued to hold his hereditary position in his land. Millar called such an arrangement a dual sovereignty. Cottius became a Roman citizen, Latinizing his name as Marcus Julius Cottius, and was appointed præfectus civitatium. Areas assigned to this type of prefect (Roman governor) were areas newly brought under Roman administration in the Augustan period. These officials oversaw areas with a number of tribes and had a fixed term of office. However, this post in Cottia was permanent and hereditary, and made him and his 14 tribes joined the Alpine regiments of the Roman army.

== Reign as client ruler ==
Cottius enriched himself through trade between Italy and Gaul as his pass was the main trading route between these two countries. His capital, Segusium (today's Susa, Piedmont) grew and was adorned with public monuments. The region would feature a Roman amphitheater and a Roman aqueduct. Under his guidance his people adopted Roman aspects in their customs, laws and language. However, they retained their religious cults intact. The identification of their gods with Roman ones occurred later.

== Death and legacy ==
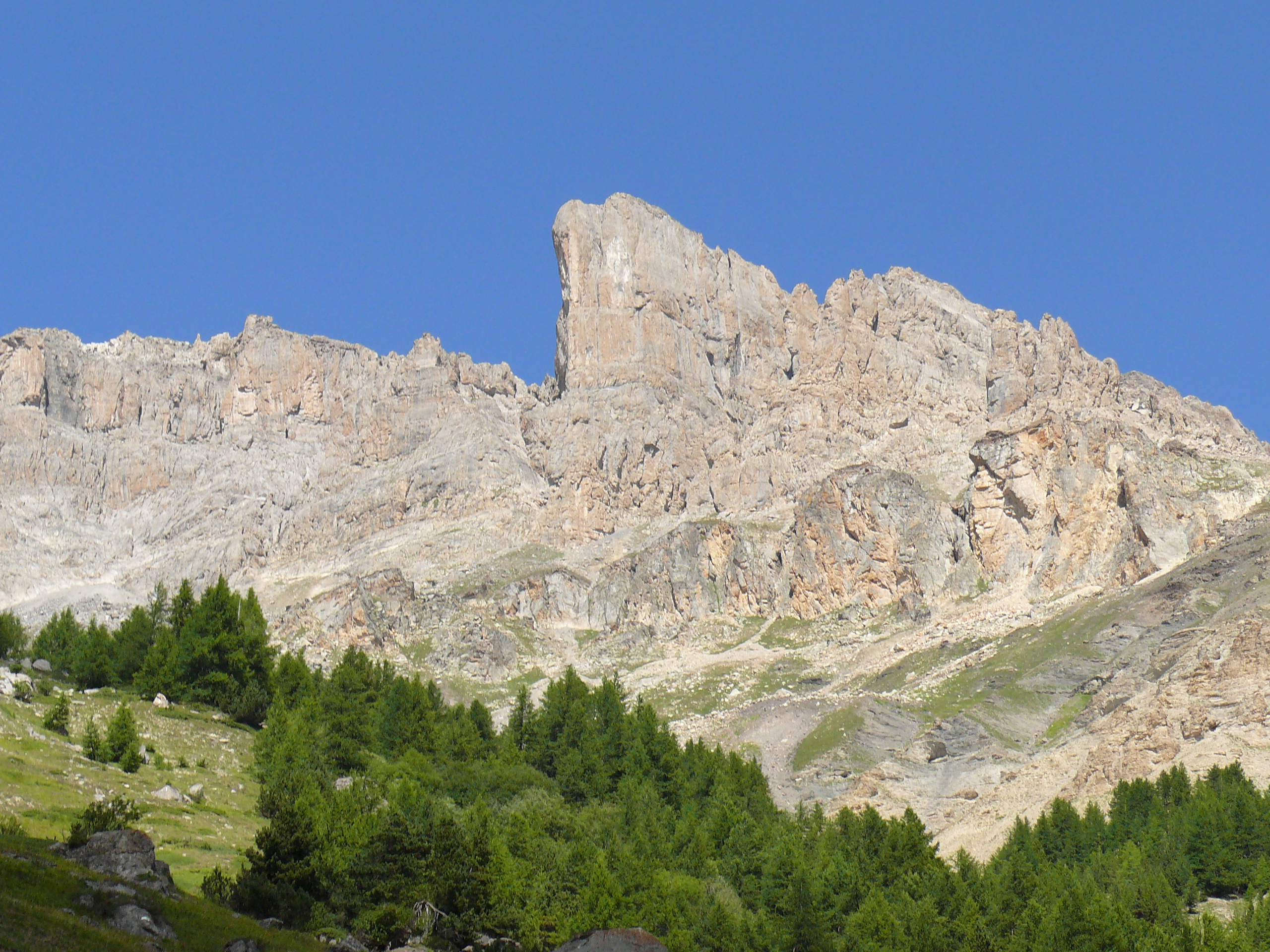
The Alpes Cottiae, now known as the Cottian Alps, previously a Roman Province

Cottius was revered as a fair king who had foresight. He was laid to rest in a mausoleum still visited in the fourth century AD. After his passing the territory of the Alpes Taurinae that he had ruled began to be identified with the name Alpes Cottiae. It seems to have been seen as having a special status to the Romans compared to that of other non-Roman peoples. Strabo described the areas where the tribes of southern Gaul lived, which he named by their ethnic names; however, he used the term country of Cottius for the Cottian Alps. Vitruvius and Suetonius used the terms kingdom of the Cottians and Cottian kingdom respectively. Ammianus Marcelinus used the term Cottianae civitiate.

== Successors ==
Cottius was succeeded by his son Gaius Julius Donnus II (reigned 3 BC-4 AD), and his grandson Marcus Julius Cottius II (reigned 5-63 AD), during whose long reign Emperor Tiberius deployed a cohort from "the kingdom of Cottius" to suppress a revolt in Pollentia. Cottius II was subsequently given additional land by Emperor Claudius and according to Cassius Dio, he "was then called King for the first time". This was a restoration of the title of King formerly held and surrendered by Cottius I. Cottius II also received additional land from Emperor Nero.

Another of the elder Cottius' sons was the Roman centurion Julius Vestalis, who retook the frontier post of Aegyssus (modern Tulcea) on the Danube after it was captured by the Getae, a deed celebrated by Roman poet Ovid in his book Epistulae ex Ponto IV.

Many members of the Cottius family adopted the name Julius in their surname, and became members of the gens Julia (gens Iulia), Patricians of Rome, such as Marcus Julius Cottius, Gaius Julius M. f. Donnus, and Marcus Julius M. f. Cottius.

== See also ==
- Alpes Cottiae (the original Roman province)
- Cottian Alps
- Donnus
