= Donnus =

- King of the Ligures
- Issue: Cottius
- Religion: Paganism

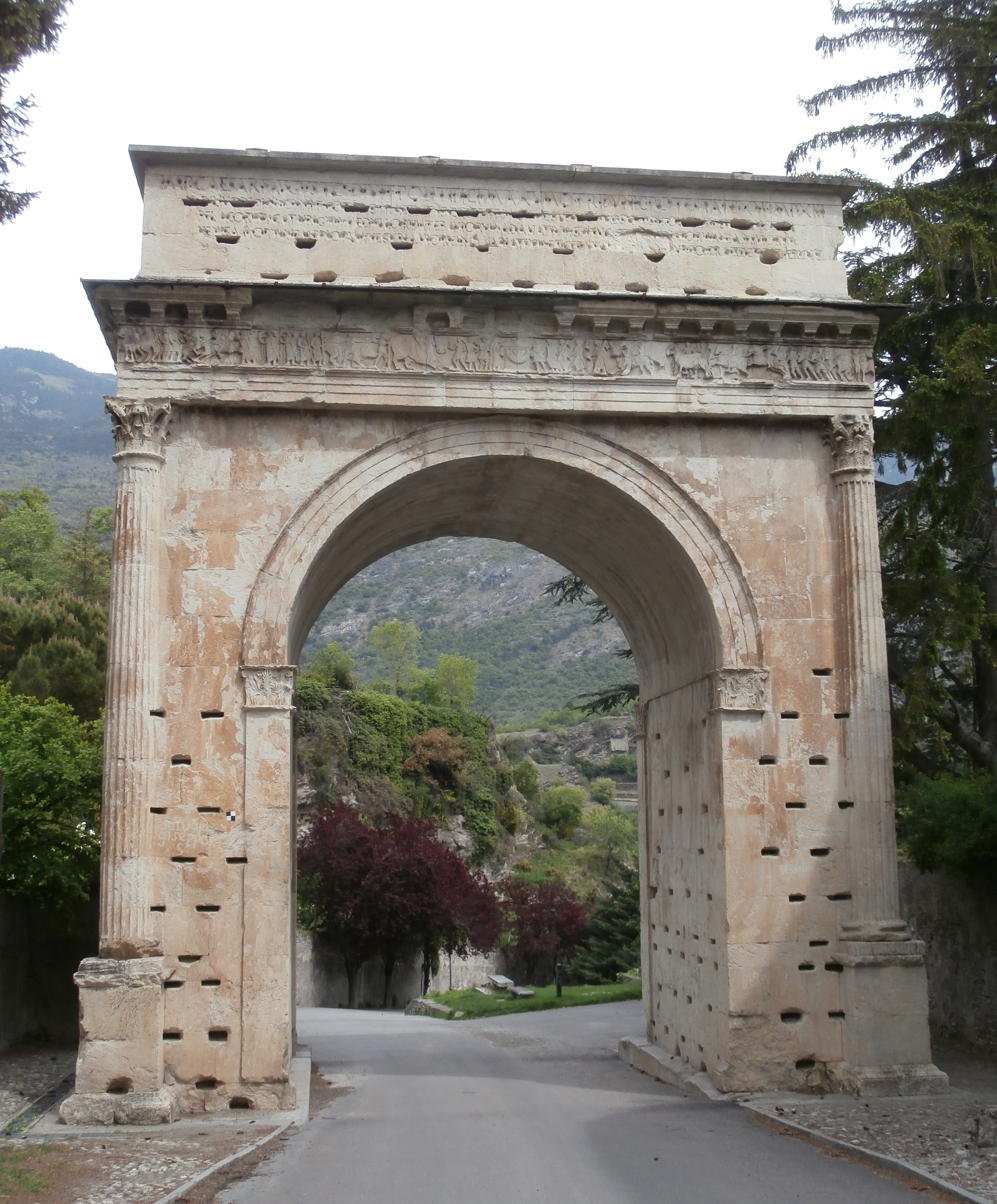
Augustan Arch, 8 B.C. Susa, Piedmont

The chieftain called Donnus by the Romans was the ruler of the Ligurian tribes inhabiting the mountainous Taurine Alps, later renamed after his son as the Cottian Alps, during the 1st century BC. Although initially an opponent of Julius Caesar during the latter's conquest of Gaul, Donnus later made peace with him. Donnus' son and successor, Cottius, initially maintained his independence in the face of Augustus' effort to subdue the various Alpine tribes, but afterwards agreed to an alliance, and the family continued to rule the region as prefects and client kings of Rome, until Nero annexed the dominion as the province of Alpes Cottiae. His name was first cited in the Arch of Augustus of Susa engraving.

== See also ==
- Alpes Cottiae (Roman province)
- Cottian Alps
- Cottius
- Arch of Augustus (Susa)
- Susa, Piedmont
