= Cimiez =

Neighborhood in Nice, France

- Neighbourhood of Nice, France
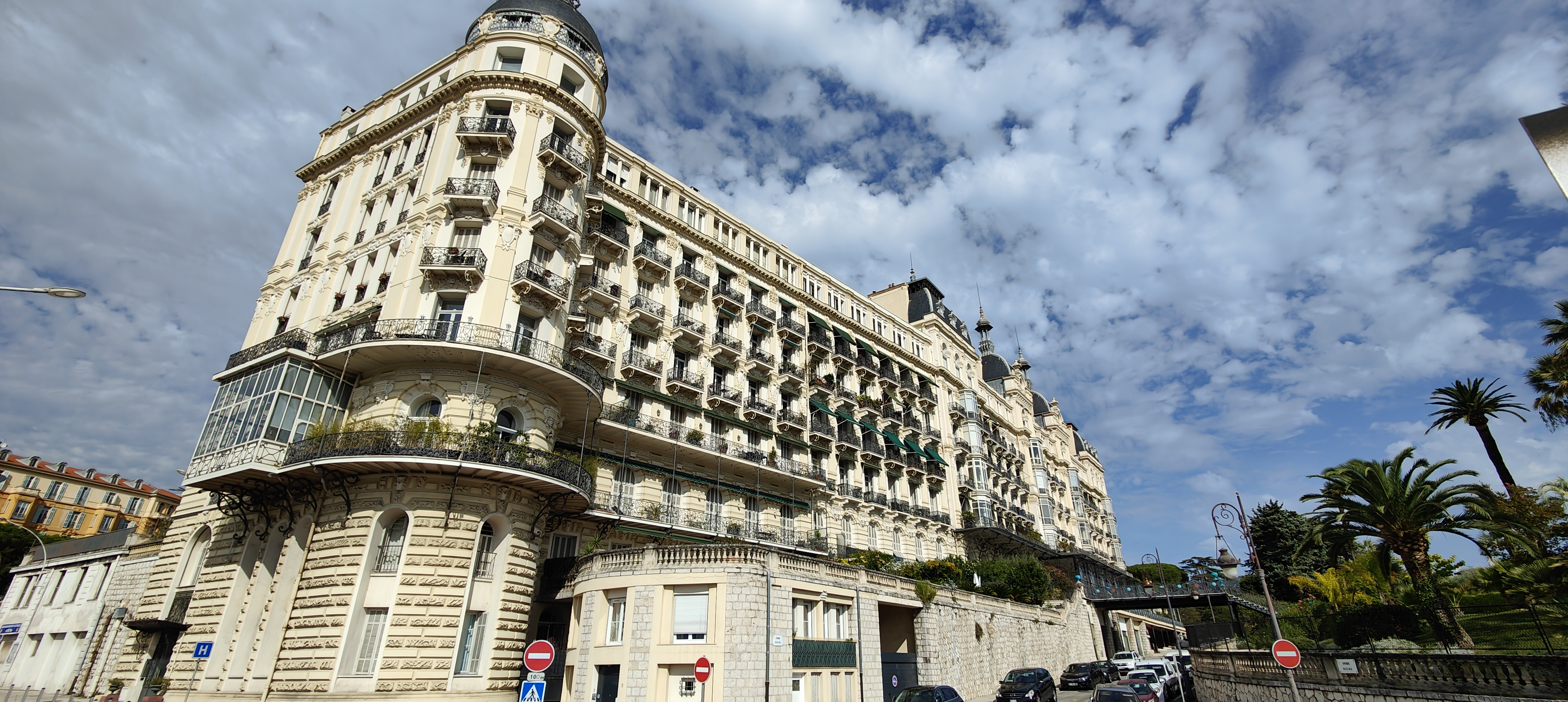
- Excelsior Régina Palace

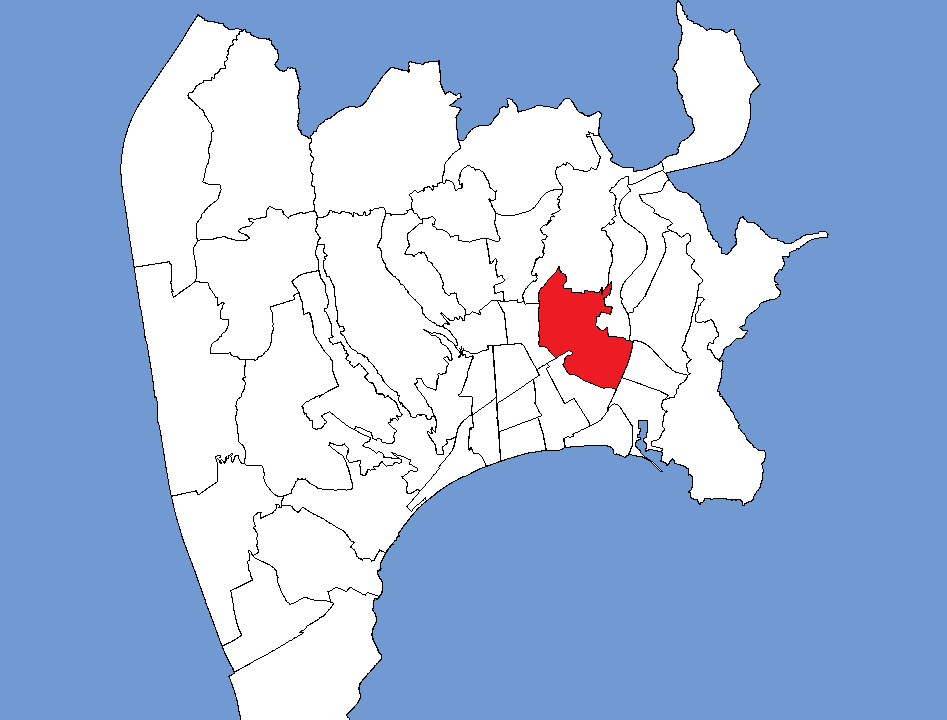
- Cimiez (red) within Nice
- Coordinates: 43°42′44″N 7°16′19″E
- Country: France
- Région: Provence-Alpes-Côte d'Azur
- Department: Alpes-Maritimes
- Arrondissement: Nice

Cimiez (French pronunciation: [simje]; Italian: Cimella) is an upper-class neighborhood in Nice, Southern France. The area contains the Musée Matisse and the ruins of Cemenelum, capital of the Ancient Roman province Alpes Maritimae on the Ligurian coast. Cemenelum was an important rival of Nice, continuing to exist as a separate city till the time of the Lombard invasions. The ruins include an arena, amphitheater, thermal baths, and paleochristian basilica.

== History ==
During the Belle Epoque, Cimiez became a favourite holiday resort of European royalty: Victoria, Edward VII, George V, and Leopold II stayed in Cimiez.

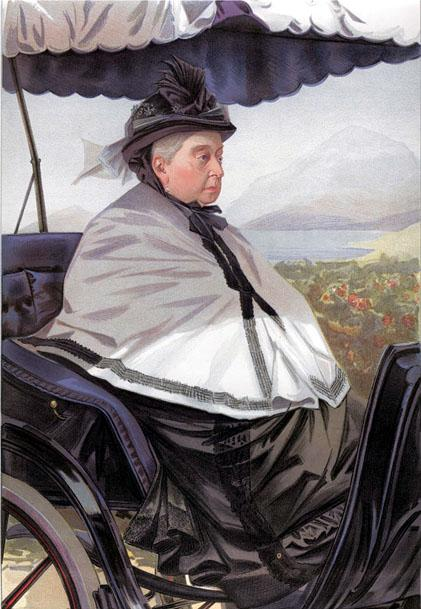
Queen Victoria at Cimiez, by Jean Baptiste Guth, June 1897

Close to the ruins is the Excelsior Régina Palace, where Queen Victoria spent part of her long visits to the French Riviera.

From 1974 to 2010, the Nice Jazz Festival was held among the Roman ruins in July each year. (In 2011 the festival moved to the Place Masséna.)

Also here can be found the Cimiez monastery and church, used by the Franciscan friars since the 16th century. The church, with a baroque altar from the seventeenth century and a marble cross from 1477, houses the paintings Pietà (triptych from 1475), Crucifixion (1512) and Deposition (1515) by the Italian artist Ludovico Brea. On display are also more than 300 documents and works of art from the 15th to 18th centuries. Buried in the cemetery near the monastery are the painters Henri Matisse and Raoul Dufy, alongside the winner of the 1937 Nobel Prize for Literature, Roger Martin du Gard.

Cimiez contains a large Jewish population (around 20%).

== Gallery ==
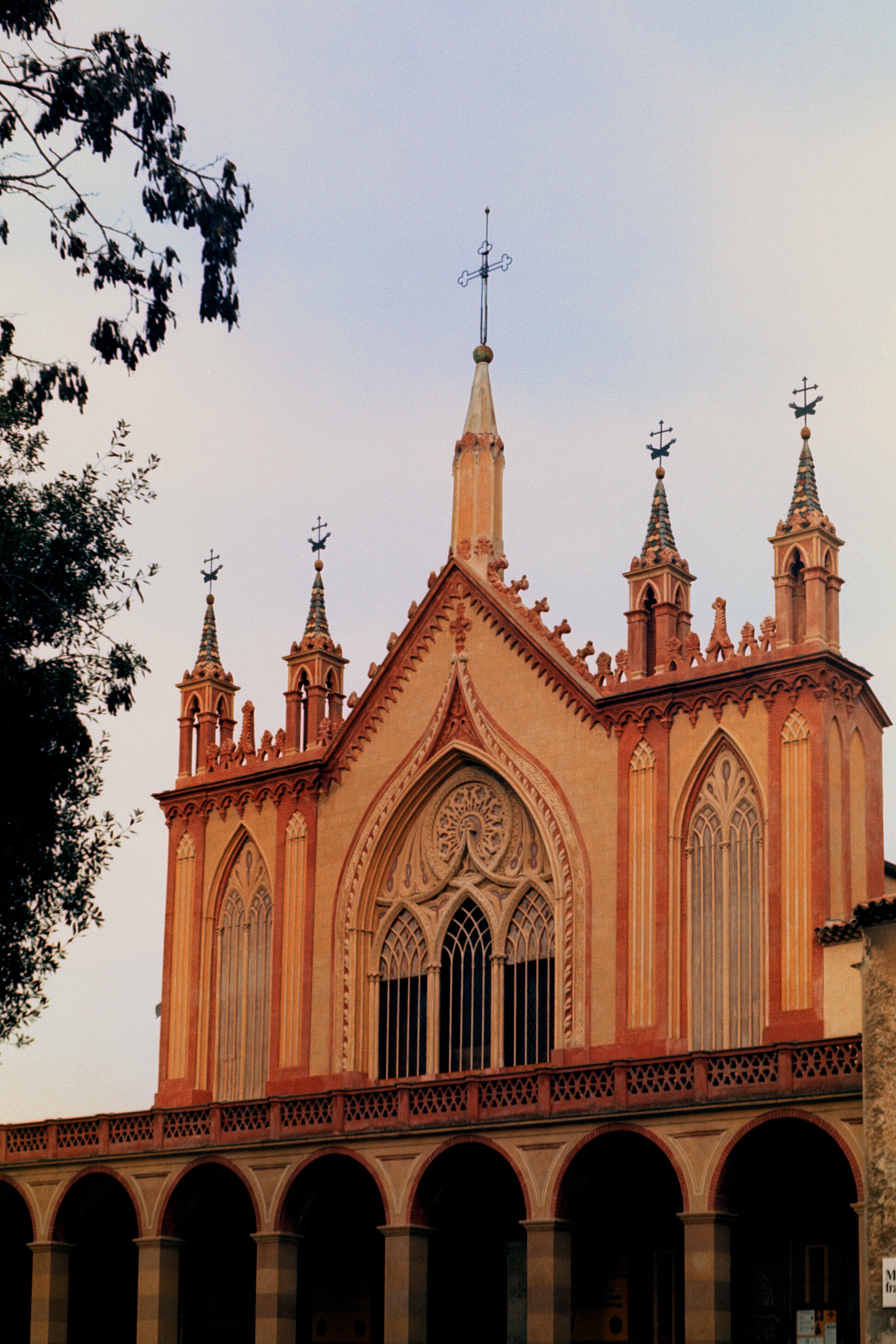
Cimiez Monastery

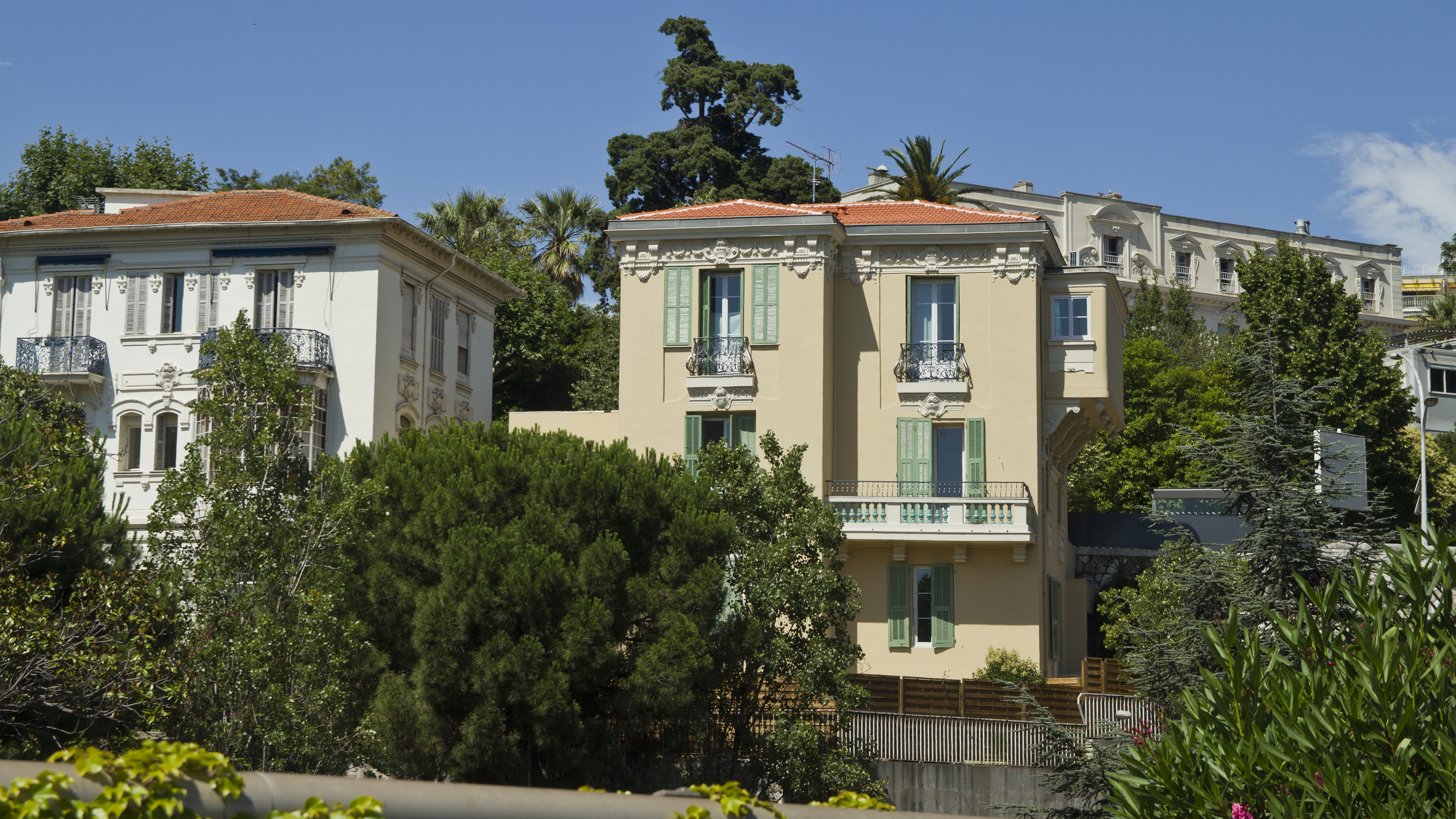
Houses in Cimiez

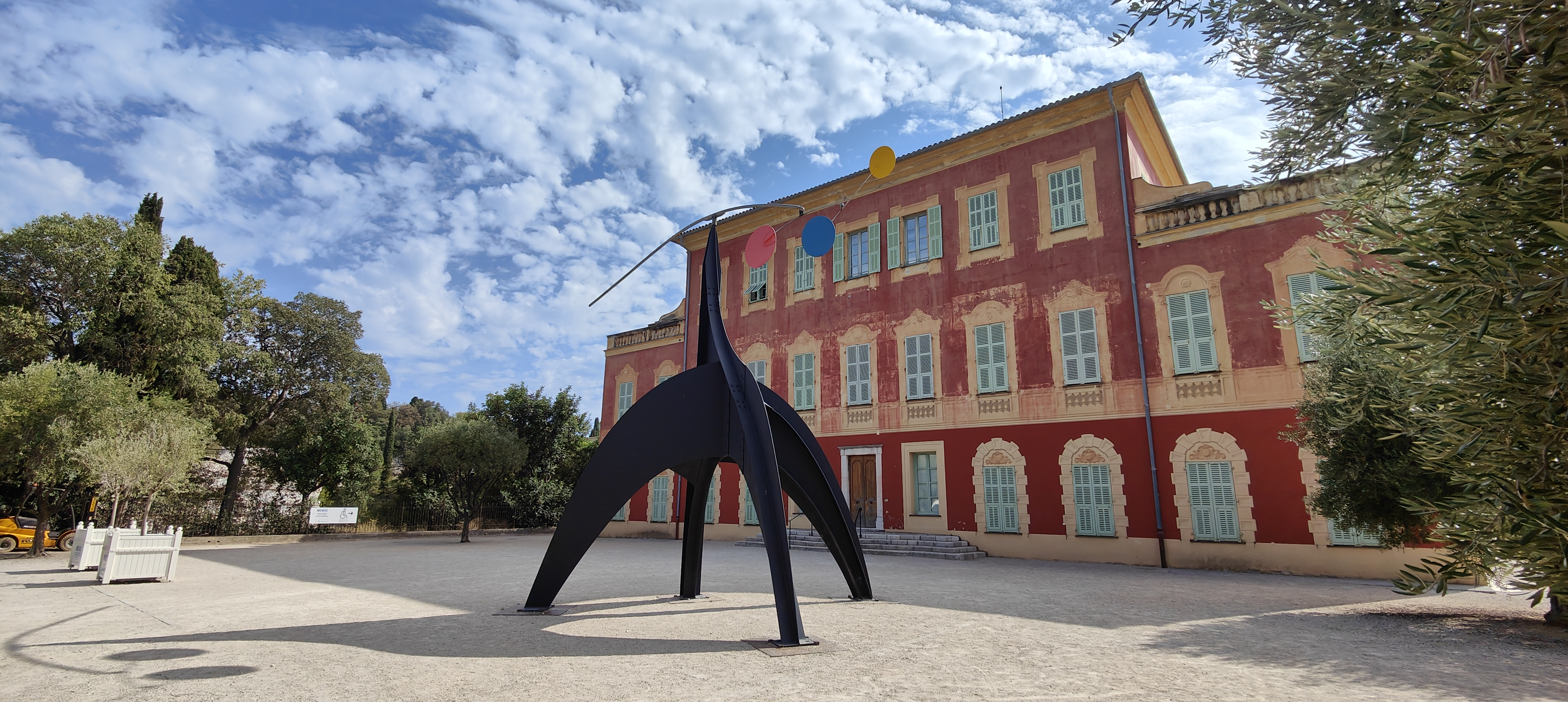
Musée Matisse

== See also ==
- Bishopric of Cimiez
