= Alpes Cottiae =

Roman province

Coordinates: 45.0167°N 6.7841°E

Provincia Alpes Cottiae
- Province of the Roman Empire
- 63 AD–476 AD
- The Roman Empire ca. AD 125, with the province of Alpes Cottiae highlighted.
- Capital: Segusio
- Historical era: Antiquity
  - Created by Nero: 63 AD
  - Deposition of Romulus Augustulus: 476 AD
Preceded by	Succeeded by
Cottii Regnum	Kingdom of Italy (476-493)
- Today part of: France; Italy

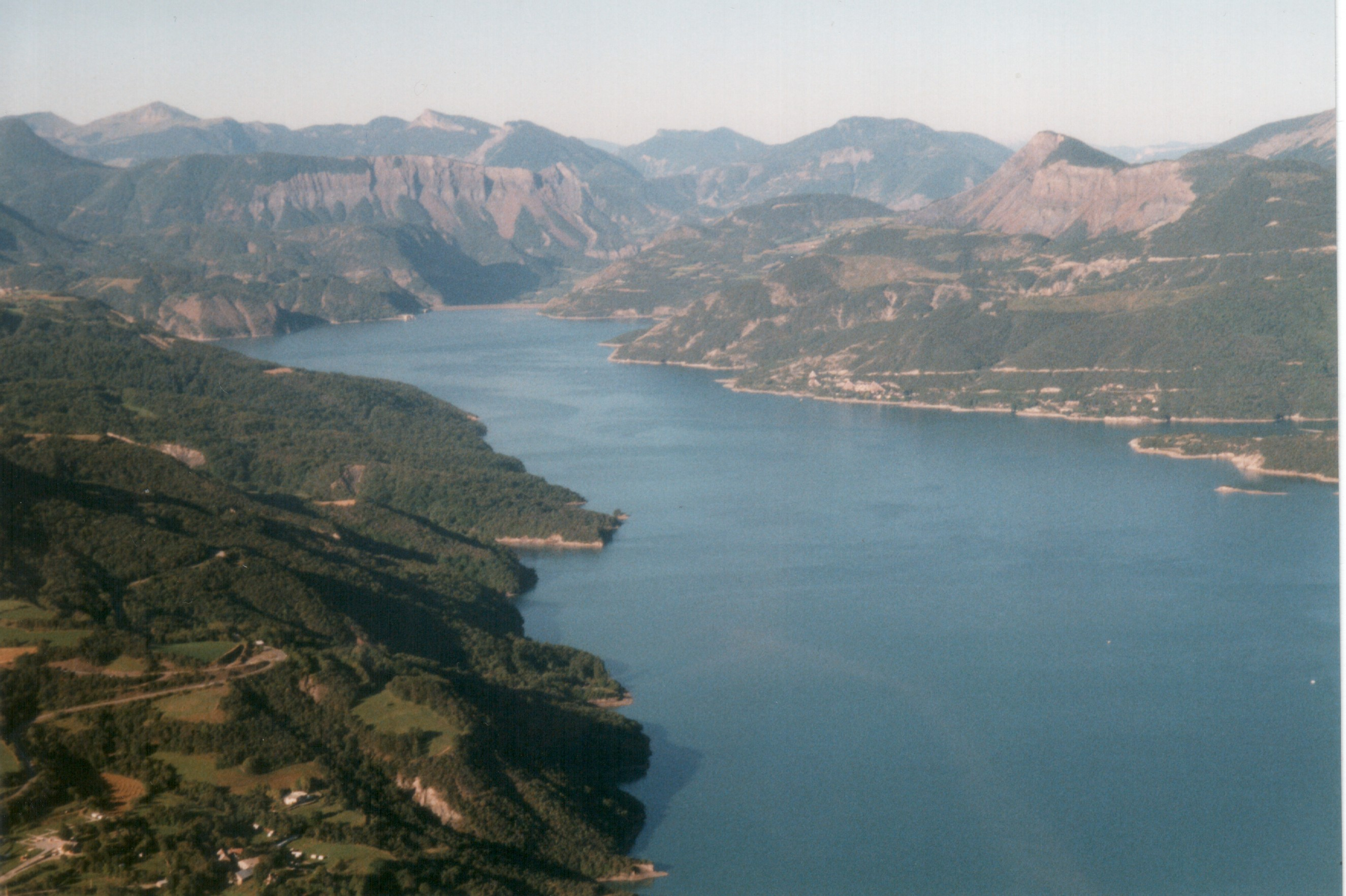
Eburodunum, mentioned by Greeks Strabo and Ptolemy as part of the Jerusalem Itinerary, in the Hautes-Alpes, France

The Alpes Cottiae (Latin pronunciation: [ˈaɫpeːs ˈkɔttɪ.ae̯]; English: 'Cottian Alps') was a small province of the Roman Empire founded in 63 AD by Emperor Nero. It was one of the three provinces straddling the Alps between modern France and Italy, along with the Alpes Graiae et Poeninae and Alpes Maritimae.

The capital of the province was Segusio (modern Susa, Piedmont). Other important settlements were located at Eburodunum and Brigantio (Briançon). Named after the 1st-century BC ruler of the region, Marcus Julius Cottius, the toponym survives today in the Cottian Alps.

== History ==
The province originated in a local chiefdom ruled by the enfranchised king Marcus Julius Donnus, who governed the Ligurian tribes of the region by the middle of the 1st century BC. He was succeeded by his son, Marcus Julius Cottius, who offered no resistance to the incorporation of his realm into the Roman imperial system under Emperor Augustus in 15–14 BC, and continued to rule the native tribes as praefectus civitatium of the Regnum Cotti.

After the death of his son, Cottius II, in 63 AD, the region was annexed by Emperor Nero and reorganised as a procuratorial province under the name provincia Alpium Cottiarum.

Under Diocletian (284–305), the western portion of the province was transferred to the Alpes Maritimae, while the eastern part was placed under a praeses within the Diocese of Italy.

== Settlements ==
Settlements in Alpes Cottiae included:

- Ad Fines (Malano) ("mansio", customs post)
- Ocelum (Celle) ("oppidum", Celtic village)
- Ad Duodecimum (Saint-Didier) ("mutatio")
- Segusio (Susa) (capital)
- Venausio (Venaus) (oppidum)
- Scingomagus / Excingomagus (Exilles) (oppidum, possibly Donnus's capital)
- Caesao / Goesao (Cesana Torinese) ("castrum")
- Ad Martes Ultor (late imperial "Ulcense") (Oulx) ("castrum")
- Brigantium (Briançon) (mansio)
- Mons Matronae (Mont Genèvre)

== See also ==
- Cottius
- Donnus
- Cottian Alps
