= List of ancient Ligurian tribes =

The Ligures (singular Ligus or Ligur; English: Ligurians) were an ancient Indo-European people who appear to have originated in, and gave their name to, Liguria, a region of north-western Italy. Elements of the Ligures appear to have migrated to other areas of western Europe, including the Iberian Peninsula.

== Ligures ==
Map 1: Ethnolinguistic map of Italy in the Iron Age, before the Roman expansion and conquest of Italy. Ligurians are located in the upper left corner of the map.

Map 2: Peoples of Cisalpine Gaul, 391–192 BC. among them showing the Ligures in the southern Alps and northern Apennines on the northern coast of the Ligurian Sea.

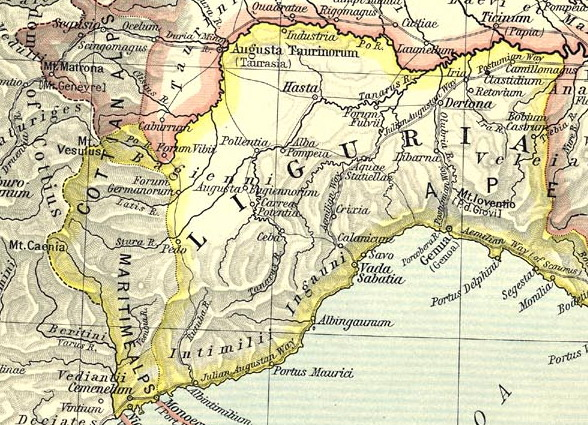
Map 3: The Roman Regio IX Liguria.

According to numerous studies, this ancient population lived divided into tribes, counting dozens of them:

- Alpini (or Montani) (in the hinterland of Savona)
- Apuani (in Lunigiana)
- Bagienni (or Vagienni) (in the area of Bene Vagienna)
- Beretini
- Bimbelli
- Briniates (or Boactes) (in the area of Brugnato)
- Casuentillani
- Cavaturini
- Celeiates
- Cerdiciates
- Deciates (in modern Provence, west of the river Var)
- Dectunini
- Docilii
- Ectini
- Eguituri
- Epanterii
- Euburiates
- Friniates (in the area now called Frignano)
- Garuli
- Genuates (or Genuenses) (in and around Genoa)
- Hercates
- Iemeri
- Ingauni
- Intemelii
- Ilvates-Iriates
  - Ilvates / Mainland Ilvates / Iriates / (Iluates?) (in the territory of Tortona, Voghera and Libarna)
  - Ilvates / Island Ilvates (or Iluates) (if different from the Iriates) (on the island of Ilva, today's Elba)
- Laevi (along the Ticino River and in the area of Pavia)
- Lapicini (or Lapicinii)
- Libici (or Libui) / Libarnesi
- Magelli (or Mucelli) (in the Mugello region)
- Marici (near the confluence of the rivers Orba, Bormida and Tanaro)
- Nematuri
- Nerusi
- Odiates
- Oratelli
- Olivari
- Oxybii (or Oxibii) (in modern Provence)
- Sabates (in the area of Vado Ligure)
- Segusini - in Susa
- Soti
- Statielli (or Statiellates) (in the valleys of the Orba [left bank], Bormida and Tanaro)
- Suelteri (or Sueltri)
- Tigulli (or Tigullii) (with main town at Tigullia, now in the frazione of Trigoso)
- Triullati
- Turi
- Vediantii
- Veiturii (west of the Genuates, in and around Voltri [now a suburb of Genoa])
  - Langates (or Langenses) (north of the Genuates)
  - Mentovini
  - Sestrini
  - Utrini
- Veleiates (or Veliates) (between Veleia and Libarna)
- Vellauni
- Veneni
- Venisani
- Vesubiani – Vésubie, Southern Gaul
- Vibelli

== Ligures mixed with other peoples ==
Map 4: Tribal groups of ancient Provence and their settlements

Map 5: Approximate locations of the various tribes of the Ancient Ligurians.

=== Celto-Ligurians / Gallo-Ligurians ===
May have been Celtic tribes influenced by Ligurians, heavyly Celticized Ligurian tribes that shifted to a Celtic ethnolinguistic identity or mixed Celtic-Ligurian tribes. They dwelt in southeastern Transalpine Gaul and northwestern Cisalpine Gaul, mainly in the Western Alps regions, Rhodanus eastern basin and upper Po river basin.

- Acitavones
- Adanates / Adenates – slopes of the Western Alps (Maurienne-Modanne), Southern Gaul
- Adunicates – Andon área, Southern Gaul
- Albici – Middle and Lower Durance river valley, Southern Gaul (tribal confederation)
  - Albienses / Albici Proper
  - Vordenses
  - Vulgientes
- Anatili
- Avantices (Avantici)
- Avatices / Avatici – Camargue – Rhodanus river delta, south of the Volcae Arecomici, in Southern Gaul
- Belaci
- Bodiontici – in Southern Gaul
- Bormanni
- Bramovices – Low Tarentaise, Savoy, Southern Gaul
- Briganii / Brigianii – Briançon, High Durance river valley, Southern Gaul
- Caburri
- Camatulici
- Casmonates / Cosmonates (in the area of Castellazzo Bormida)
- Caturiges – Chorges, High Durance river valley, in Southern Gaul
- Cavares/Cavari – North of Low Durance, Arausio (Orange), in Southern Gaul (tribal confederation)
  - Cavares Proper
  - Meminii / Menimii
- Ceutrones / Centrones – Moûtiers, in the western Alps slopes, Southern Gaul
- Coenicenses
- Dexivates
- Esubiani – Ubaye Valley, Southern Gaul
- Euburiates
- Gabieni
- Glanici
- Graioceli / Garocelli – Alps western slopes in part of eastern Savoy, and Alps eastern slopes, northwestern Piedmont in the Graian Alps
- Iadatini
- Iconii – Gap, in Southern Gaul
- Irienses
- Libii / Libici
- Ligauni
- Maielli
- Medulli – upper valley of Maurienne, Southern Gaul
- Naburni
- Nearchi
- Nemalones / Nemolani – in Southern Gaul
- Nemeturii – High Var river valley, Southern Gaul
- Orobii - in the northern Italian Alpine valleys of Bergamo, Como and Lecco
- Quariates – in Southern Gaul
- Reieni / Reii - in Southern Gaul
- Salassi (Gallo-Ligurian people) – Aosta Valley and Canavese (Northern Piedmont) (Ivrea)
- Salyes / Salluvii - in southeastern Cisalpine Gaul (modern Provence)
- Savincates
- Sebagini
- Segobriges
- Segovi
- Segusini - in Segusa (today's Susa, Piemonte)
- Sentienes / Sentii – Senez, in Southern Gaul
- Sigorii
- Sogiontii
- Suelteri / Sueltri
- Suetrii
- Taurini (or Taurisci) (Gallo-Ligurian people) – parts of central Piedmont (Turin region)
- Tebavii
- Tricastini
- Tricorii – in Southern Gaul
- Tritolii
- Ucenni
- Veamini – in Southern Gaul
- Vennavi
- Vergunni – Vinon-sur-Verdon, Southern Gaul
- Verucini
- Vocontii / Transalpine Gaul Vertamocori – Vaison-la-Romaine, Southern Gaul (in modern Provence, on the east bank of the Rhône and Vercors, southern Gaul.
  - Vertamocorii – Eastern Piedmont (Novara). Said by Pliny to descend from the Vocontii.

=== Ibero-Ligurians ===
- Elisyces / Helisyces – a tribe that dwelt in the region of Narbo (Narbonne) and modern northern Roussillon. May have been either Iberian or Ligurian or a Ligurian-Iberian tribe.

== Possible Ligurian tribes ==
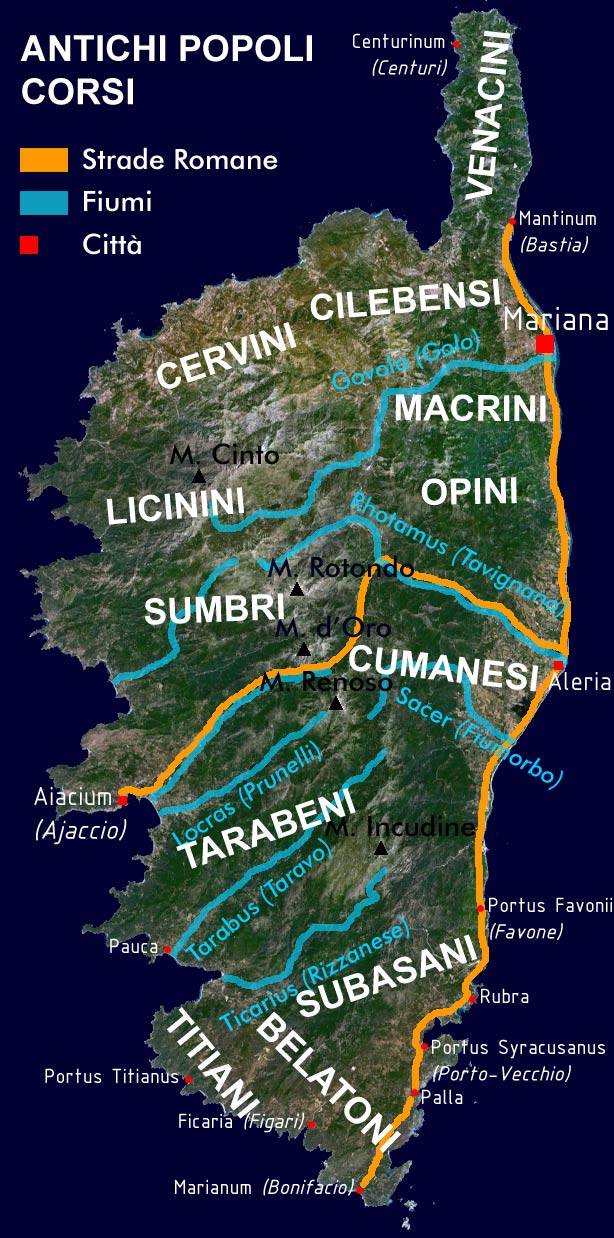
Map 6: Ancient tribes of Corsica

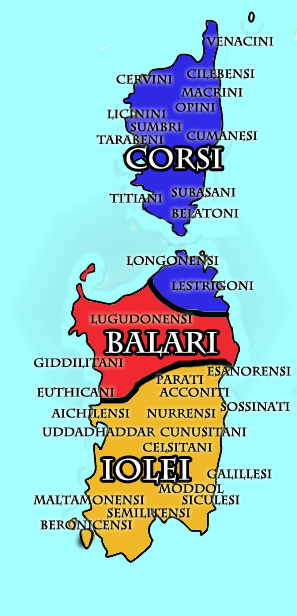
Map 7: Ancient tribes of Corsica and Sardinia. The Corsi resided in the northernmost part of Sardinia.

The Corsi were an ancient people who inhabited the islands of Corsica and northern Sardinia, in the region now known as Gallura. According to historian Ettore Pais and archeologist Giovanni Ugas, the Corsi likely belonged to the Ligurian people. Seneca held a similar view, maintaining that the Corsi were of mixed origin, the result of the continuous intermingling of various ethnic groups of foreign origin, such as the Ligurians, the Greeks, and the Iberians.

- Belatones (Belatoni)
- Cervini
- Cilebenses (Cilibensi)
- Corsi Proper, they dwelt at the far northeast of Sardinia, near the Tibulati and immediately north of the Coracenses.
- Cumanenses (Cumanesi)
- Lestricones/Lestrigones (Lestriconi/Lestrigoni), they dwelt Northern Sardinia, in the wider Gallura region, although the precise boundaries of their territory are uncertain.
- Licinini
- Longonenses (Longonensi), they dwelt Northern Sardinia, in the wider Gallura region, although the precise boundaries of their territory are uncertain.
- Macrini
- Opini
- Subasani
- Sumbri
- Tarabeni
- Tibulati, they dwelt at the far north of Sardinia, about the ancient city of Tibula, near the Corsi (for whom Corsica is named) and immediately north of the Coracenses.
- Titiani
- Venacini

== See also ==
- Ligures
- Ligurian (ancient language)
- Italic peoples
- List of ancient Corsican and Sardinian tribes
- Ancient peoples of Italy
- Alpine race
- Torrean civilization

== Bibliography ==
- ARSLAN E. A. 2004b, LVI.14 Garlasco, in I Liguri. Un antico popolo europeo tra Alpi e Mediterraneo, Catalogo della Mostra (Genova, 23.10.2004–23.1.2005), Milano-Ginevra, pp. 429–431.
- ARSLAN E. A. 2004 c.s., Liguri e Galli in Lomellina, in I Liguri. Un antico popolo europeo tra Alpi e Mediterraneo, Saggi Mostra (Genova, 23.10.2004–23.1.2005).
- Raffaele De Marinis, Giuseppina Spadea (a cura di), Ancora sui Liguri. Un antico popolo europeo tra Alpi e Mediterraneo, De Ferrari editore, Genova 2007 (scheda sul volume).
- John Patterson, Sanniti, Liguri e Romani, Comune di Circello;Benevento
- Giuseppina Spadea (a cura di), "I Liguri. Un antico popolo europeo tra Alpi e Mediterraneo" (catalogo mostra, Genova 2004–2005), Skira editore, Genova 2004
- Ugas, Giovanni (1 January 2006). L'alba dei nuraghi. Cagliari: Fabula Editore. ISBN 978-88-89661-00-0.
