= Cohors IV Aquitanorum equitata c.R. =

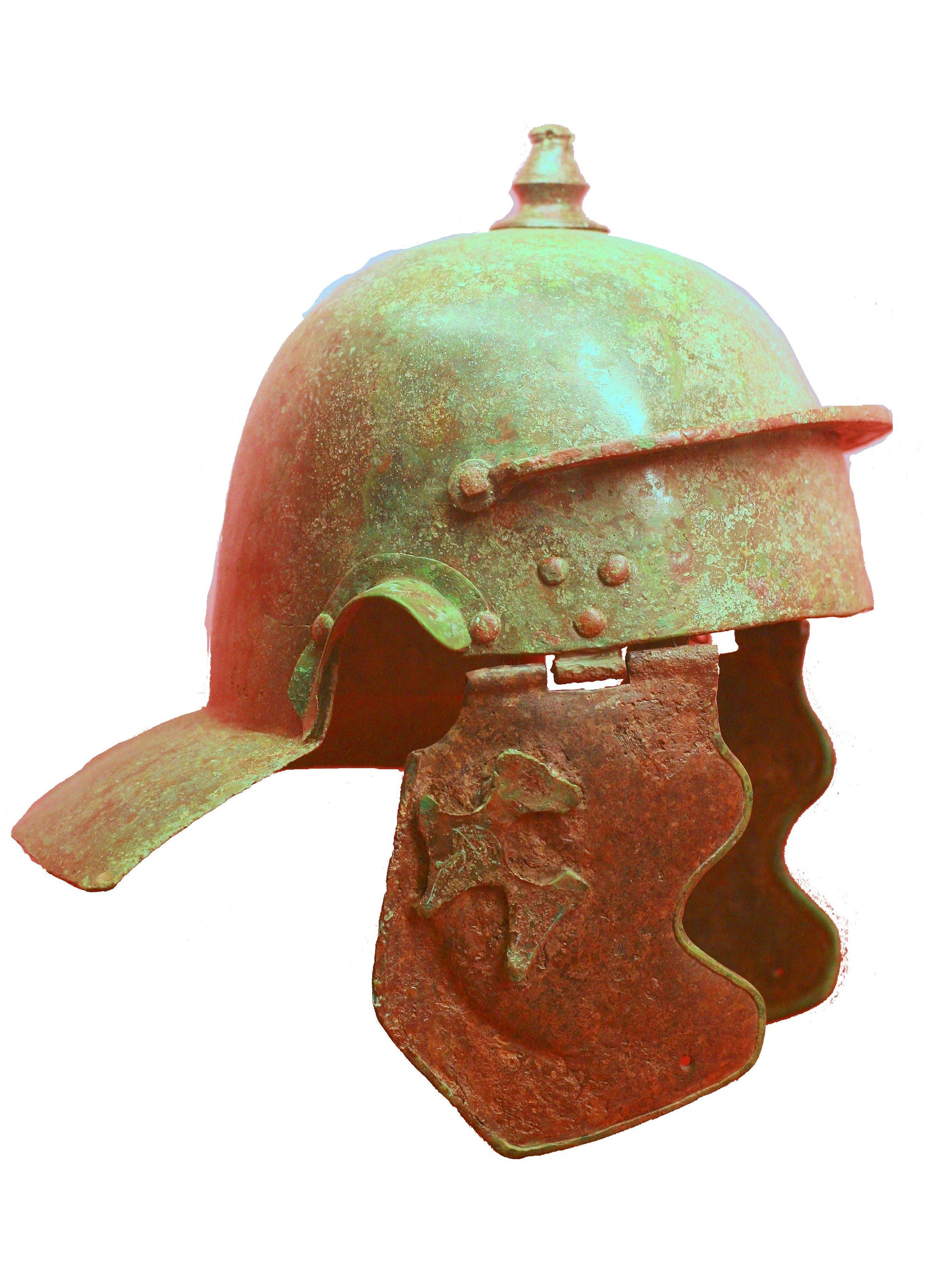
- Roman infantry helmet (late 1st century)
- Active: early 1st century to at least 210
- Country: Roman Empire
- Type: Roman auxiliary cohort
- Role: infantry/cavalry
- Size: 600 men (480 infantry, 120 cavalry)
- Garrison/HQ: Germania Superior 74-210

Cohors quarta Aquitanorum equitata civium Romanorum ("4th part-mounted Cohort of Aquitani Roman citizens") was a Roman auxiliary mixed infantry and cavalry regiment. It was probably originally raised in the Julio-Claudian era, perhaps under Augustus after the subjugation of the Aquitani in 26 BC. Alternatively, it may have been raised in a later levy of Aquitani after 14 AD. Unlike most Gauls, the Aquitani were not Celtic-speaking but spoke Aquitanian, a now extinct non Indo-European language closely related to Basque. Some tribes in Aquitania were Celtic-speaking however, such as the Bituriges.

The regiment first appears in the datable epigraphic record in Germania Superior (Pfalz-Alsace) in 74 AD. It remained based in Germania Superior for all its recorded existence. Its last datable attestation is a building inscription of 210. The regiment's inscriptions have been found at the following Roman forts: Friedburg; Ingelheim; Mainz (210); Obenburg (162).

The names of 2 praefecti (regimental commanders) are preserved, one of whom, Lucius Petronius Florentinus, is recorded as from Saldas. Also recorded are a centurio (infantry officer), Ti. Iulius Niger, on a tombstone in St. Lizier in Aquitania, so presumably this soldier was from the original recruitment area of the regiment. The inscription is therefore probably early 1st century. The stone mentions Niger's brother, Dunomagius son of Toutannorix, clearly a Gaulish name. (Niger must have adopted a Roman name on becoming a Roman citizen). A regimental medicus (doctor) is recorded, M. Rubrius Zosimus from Ostia, the port of the city of Rome. The last name is Greek, as were many army medics. Finally, a cornicen (hornblower) is recorded (210).

The honorific title civium Romanorum (c.R. for short) was normally awarded by the emperor for valour to an auxiliary regiment as a whole. The award would include the grant of Roman citizenship to all the regiment's men, but not to subsequent recruits to the regiment. The regiment, however, would retain the prestigious title in perpetuity. Until 212, only a minority of the empire's inhabitants (inc. all Italians) held full Roman citizenship. The rest were denoted peregrini, a second-class status. Since the legions admitted only citizens, peregrini could only enlist in the auxilia. Citizenship carried a number of tax and other privileges and was highly sought after. It could also be earned by serving the minimum 25-year term in the auxilia.

== See also ==
- List of Roman auxiliary regiments
