= Punta Manara =

Scenic point

Coordinates: 44.2524°N 9.4049°E

Footpaths on Punta Manara

Punta Manara is the end of a promontory in the Gulf of Tigullio between the Ligurian towns of Sestri Levante and Riva Trigoso in the Province of Genoa, Italy. It has been subject to environmental protection since 1977.

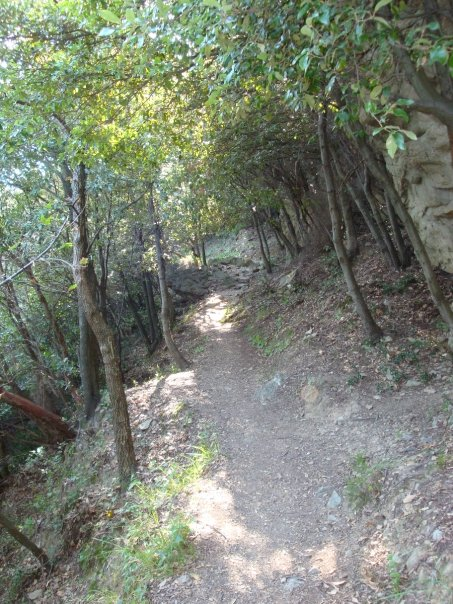
Path leading to Punta Manara

Punta Manara is a popular destination for tourists from Italy and from all over the world. Located at the southeast of the Gulf of Tigullio, it offers glimpses of the coast and many plant and animal species that inhabit the maquis shrubland.

The headland is approximately 190 hectares (470 acres), of which about 50 hectares (120 acres) are covered with by ilex trees, while the remaining area is divided between high maquis with arbutus and heather, and a small strip of cork oak woodland. At an altitude of 265 metres (869 ft), the top of the promontory is called Monte Castello and is covered by maritime pine woodland, in which are the ruins of an ancient fortress and of military buildings from World War II.

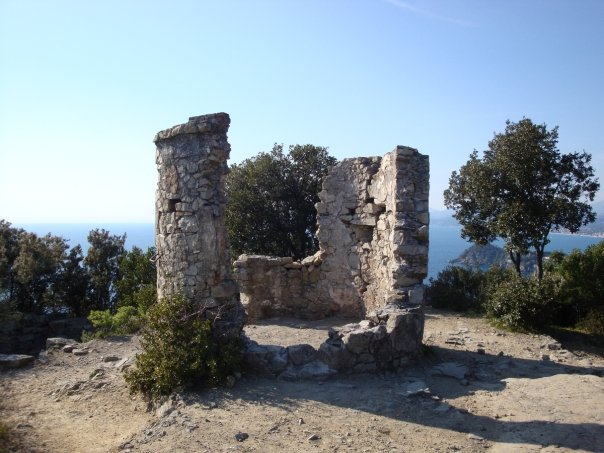
Saracen watchtower

The well-preserved remains of a watchtower for defence against Saracens stand at about 140 metres (460 ft) above sea level. It is a strategic site, and an excellent maritime lookout location.

The northern slopes of Punta Manara collect water which flows into Rio Ravino, which crosses the main path to the headland. Although small, it collects water from several tributaries and is a used for irrigating vegetables and olive trees around the village of Ginestra. The annual rainfall in the area is about 1,200 mm (47 in).

Punta Manara can only be reached by paths that climb the promontory above Sestri Levante. A nature trail on the promontory has signs that describe the plants that can be seen. There is a municipal campsite near the end of the promontory.

== Flora ==
Plant species on the headland include Arbutus unedo (strawberry tree), samphires, myrtle, cistus, erica arborea (tree heath), mastic and broom. Tree species include black alder, holm oak, cork oak and maritime pine.
