= Acitavones =

Gallic tribe

The Acitavones were a small Gallic tribe dwelling in the Alps during the Iron Age.

== Name ==
They are mentioned as Acitavones (var. agitabo-) by Pliny (1st c. AD) and on the Tropaeum Alpium.

The etymology of the name Acitauones is unclear. The first element, acito-, could mean 'field' (cf. Old Irish ached, achad), or else be a variant of agido- ('face, appearance').

== Geography ==
According to historian Guy Barruol, they may have dwelled in the Aosta Valley, near the Little St Bernard Pass. The Barrington Atlas locates their territory north of the Medulli and Segusini, south of the Veragri, west of the Salassi, and east of the Ceutrones.

== History ==
They are mentioned by Pliny the Elder as one of the Alpine tribes conquered by Rome in 16–15 BC, and whose name was engraved on the Tropaeum Alpium.
