= Segusini =

Gallic tribe

The Segusini (Gaulish: *Segusinoi, 'those of Segusio') were a Gallic tribe dwelling around present-day Susa, in the Alpes Cottiae, during the Iron Age.

== Name ==
They are mentioned, in genitive case, as Segosianō̃n (Σεγοσιανῶν) Strabo (early 1st c. AD), as Segousianō̃n (Σεγουσιανῶν) Ptolemy (2nd c. AD), as Segusinorum on the Arch of Susa, and, in nominative case, as Segusinae on an inscription.

The ethnonym Segusini is a Latinized form of Gaulish *Segusinoi. It means 'the people of Segusio', itself from the root sego- ('victory, force').

== Geography ==
The Segusini dwelled in the valley of the Duria, around Segusio (modern Susa). The Barrington Atlas locates their territory east of the Medulli and Belaci, south of the Acitavones, and west of the Iemerii and Taurini.

Their chief town, Segusio, controlled the route over Mont Genèvre and served as the gateway into the Italian Peninsula. Segusio possessed Latin law probably from the time of Augustus (27 BC–14 AD) and was a municipium from the time of Nero (54–58 AD). It was conquered by Constantinus in 312 AD.

== History ==
They are attested on the Arch of Susa, erected by Cottius in 9–8 BC.
