= Ucennii =

Gallic tribe

The Ucennii, Ucenni or Iconii were a Gallic tribe dwelling in the Romanche valley, in the Alps, during the Iron Age.

== Name ==
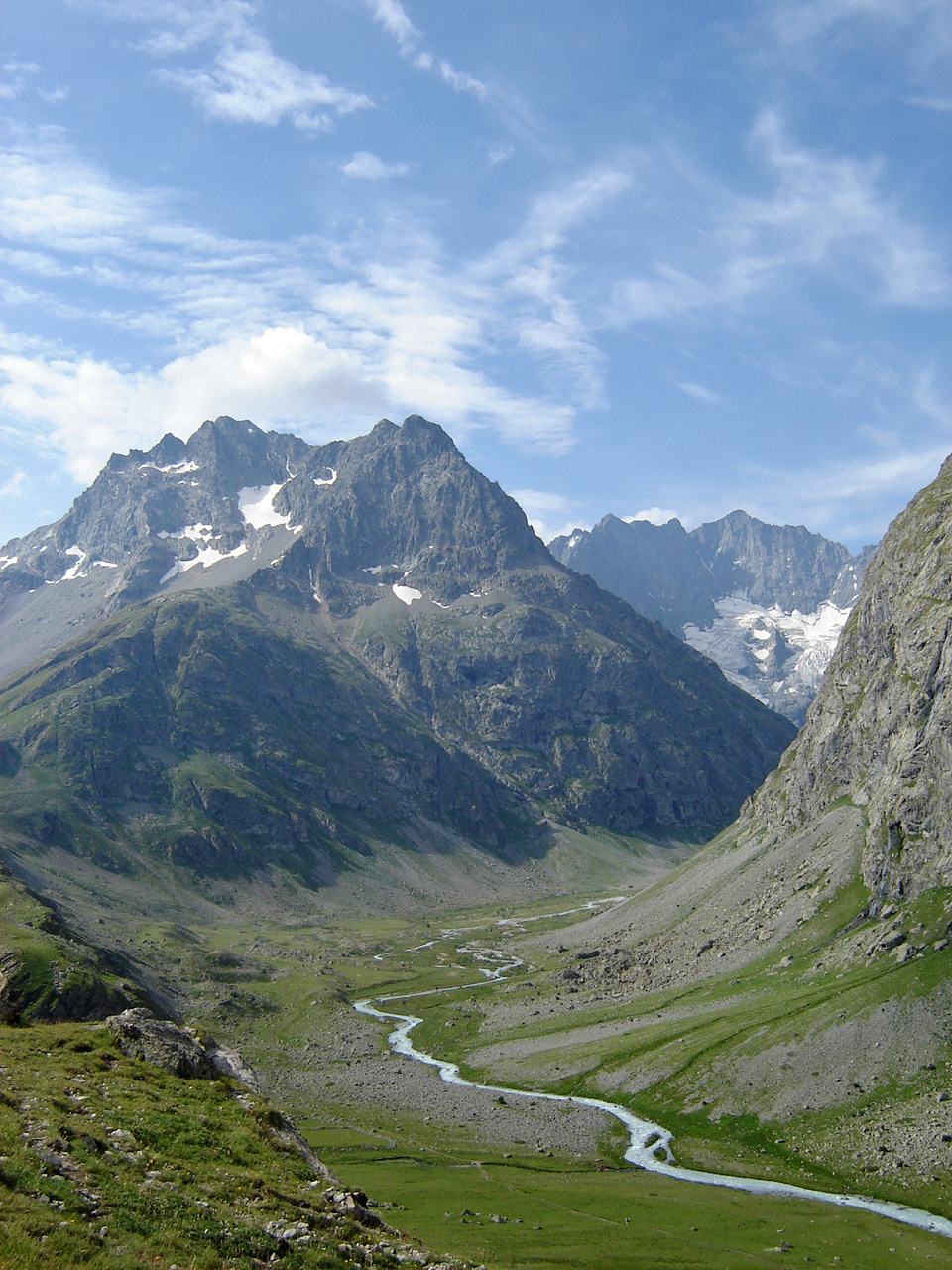
Romanche valley, the territory of the Ucennii

They are mentioned as Ucenni (var. uceni, ucermi) by Pliny (1st c. AD) and on the Tropaeum Alpium, as Ucennos (var. cennos, sennos, scennos) by Florus. The form Ikónioi (Ἰκόνιοι) given by Strabo (early 1st c. AD) is most likely a variant of the ethnic name.

The meaning of the name remains obscure, although it is most likely of Celtic origin. It can be compared with the toponym Ucena in Galatia.

== Geography ==
The Ucenni lived in the Romanche valley, in the region of Oisans. The Barrington Atlas locates their territory south of the Graioceli, west of the Belaci, Segovii and Brigianii, north of the Tricorii, and west of the Vertamocorii and Allobroges.

Settlements are known at Catorissium (Le Bourg-d'Oisans), Mellosedum (Mont-de-Lans), and Durotincum (near La Grave and Villar-d'Arêne).

== History ==
They are mentioned by Pliny the Elder as one of the Alpine tribes conquered by Rome in 16–15 BC, and whose name was engraved on the Tropaeum Alpium.
