= Segovii =

Gallic tribe

The Segovii (Gaulish: *Segouioi, 'the victorious, powerful') were a Gallic tribe dwelling in the Alpes Cottiae, around present-day Cesana Torinese and Montgenèvre, during the Iron Age.

== Name ==
They are attested as Segoviorum on the Arch of Susa.

The ethnonym Segovii is a latinized form of Gaulish *Segouioi. It derives from the root sego-, meaning 'victory, force'. It is comparable with the feminine forms Segouia (Segovia) and Segauias (now Göfis).

== Geography ==
The Segovii dwelled around the towns of Gaesao/Tyrium (modern Cesana Torinese) and Druantium (Montgenèvre; also named *Alpis Cottia and Summae Alpes). The Barrington Atlas locates their territory south of the Belaci, north of the Brigianii and Quariates, and east of the Ucenni. The settlement of Ad Fines (modern Fenils) may have been the border between the territories of the Segovii and Belaci.

== History ==
They are mentioned on the Arch of Susa, erected by Cottius in 9–8 BC.
