= Iadatini =

Ancient community in Roman Liguria

The Iadatini were a small community of Roman Liguria, in the western Po plain of northern Italy. They are known only from a single funerary inscription of the Roman imperial period, in which they appear as the vicani Iadatini, the inhabitants of a vicus. The inscription records a bequest made to them by a local magistrate for the annual offering of roses at his tomb.

== Name ==
The Iadatini are attested only by a funerary inscription from Vardacate (modern Casale Monferrato), where they are named as the vicani Iadatini. The term vicani identifies them as the inhabitants of a vicus, a village community.

The inscription records that Marcus Sullius Verus, a quattuorvir of Vardacate, bequeathed 400 sesterces to the vicani Iadatini, so that from the income they should each year place roses on his own tomb and on that of his parents.

== Geography ==
The inscription naming the Iadatini comes from Vardacate, assigned to the Augustan Region IX (Liguria). The Barrington Atlas places them around modern Occimiano (near Casale Monferrato), west of the Laevi, Marici and Anamares, east of the Taurini, north of the Statielli, and south of the Libicii.
