= Venisami =

Gallic tribe

The Venisami (Gaulish: *Uenisamoi) or Venisamores were a Gallic tribe dwelling in the Alps during the Iron Age.

== Name ==
They are mentioned as Venisamorum on the Arch of Susa.

The ethnic name Venisami is a latinized form of Gaulish *Uenisamoi (sing. Uenisamos). It can be derived from the stem ueni- ('family, clan, friends') attached to -sāmo- ('calm'), and translated as the 'friendly ones'. It is comparable with the personal names Uenisamus (in Cisalpina) and Uenixama (in Lepontia).

== Geography ==
The Barrington Atlas locates their territory around Forum Germanici (modern Busca), south of the Binbelli, north of the Epanterii, and east of the Statielli.

== History ==
They appear on the Arch of Susa, erected by Cottius in 9–8 BC.
