= Tegea (Crete) =

Tegea (Ancient Greek: Τεγέα) was an ancient town in Crete. Its location is not known, though the Barrington Atlas of the Greek and Roman World tentatively suggests that it was located near modern Deliana

Stephanus of Byzantium reports a mythic tradition that the city was founded by Agamemnon.
