= Tegulata =

Tegulata may refer to:

- Teulisna, a genus of moths
- Tigullia, an ancient town of Liguria, Italy
