= Paterlini =

Paterlini is an Italian surname. Notable people with the surname include:

- Ermes Paterlini (born 1947), Italian footballer
- Lucas Paterlini (born 1982), Argentine cricketer
- Matias Paterlini (born 1977), Argentine cricketer
- Thierry Paterlini (born 1975), Swiss ice hockey player

== See also ==
- Patrizia Paterlini-Bréchot, Italian biologist
