= Belaci =

Gallic tribe

The Belaci were a small Gallic tribe dwelling in the Alpes Cottiae, around present-day Oulx, during the Iron Age.

== Name ==
They are mentioned as Belacorum on the Arch of Susa.

The ethnonym Belaci is possibly Celtic, stemming from the root belo- ('strong') extended by the suffix -aco-. Variants beginning with V- may also occur in inscriptions, as in Vellaconis, Velaci, Velaco, Velagenius, Vilagenio, Vilagenia, Velagenus, or Velacena.

The toponym Beaulard, located in their territory, derives from an earlier Belas.

== Geography ==
The Belaci dwelled around the settlements of Ad Martis (modern Oulx) and Diovia (Bardonecchia). The Barrington Atlas locates their territory north of the Segovii, south of the Medulli, west of the Segusini, and east of the Graioceli.

Their chief town, Ad Martis, was situated on the road crossing through the Alpes Cottiae above Segusio, at the confluence of the Dora di Bardonecchia and the Dora Riparia. It derives its name from a cult site dedicated to the Roman god Mars, ad (fanum) Martis. The settlement of Ad Fines (modern Fenils) may have served as the border between the territories of the Segovii and Belaci.

== History ==
They are mentioned on the Arch of Susa, erected by Cottius in 9–8 BC.
