= Bituriges Vivisci =

Gallic tribe

The Bituriges Vivisci (Gaulish: Biturīges Uiuisci) were a Gallic tribe dwelling near Burdigala (modern-day Bordeaux) during the Roman period. They shared their name with the Bituriges Cubi of the Berry region. Under Augustus they were organised as a civitas of Aquitania, with Burdigala as its chief town.

== Name ==
They are mentioned as Bitourígōn te tō͂n Ou̓iouískōn (Βιτουρίγων τε τῶν Οὐιουίσκων) by Strabo (early 1st c. AD), Bituriges liberi cognomine Vivisci by Pliny (1st c. AD), and as Bitoúrges oi̔ Ou̓ibískoi (Βιτούργες οἱ Οὐιβίσκοι) by Ptolemy (2nd c. AD).

The Gaulish ethnonym Biturīges means 'kings of the world', or possibly 'perpetual kings'. It derives from the stem bitu- ('world', perhaps also 'perpetual'; cf. OIr. bith 'world, life, age', bith- 'eternally', Old Welsh bid 'world') attached to riges ('kings'). Whether the meaning 'perpetual' was already associated with bitu- in ancient Celtic languages or appeared later in Old Irish remains uncertain. In any case, the Celtic meaning 'world' probably emerged from the notion of 'living world, place of the livings', since *bitu- derives from Proto-Indo-European *gʷiH-tu-, meaning 'life'.

The same name was borne by the Bituriges Cubi of central Gaul. Venceslas Kruta sees this homonymy as a possible sign of shared origin. Michel Bats cautions that a shared ethnonym alone does not necessarily point to a common origin or to any movement of population, since a prestige self-designation such as 'kings of the world' could be taken up independently by unrelated peoples.

== Geography ==
The Bituriges Vivisci dwelled in the modern Bordelais region, between the Garonne (Garumna) river and the Atlantic ocean. The Barrington Atlas locates them west of the Petrocorii, south of the Santones, northwest of the Nitiobroges and Cadurci, and east of the smaller Medulli. The boundary between the civitates of the Vivisci and Santones ran roughly along the line of the modern departments of Gironde and Charente-Maritime.

Their port (emporium) and chief town was Burdigala (Bordeaux). According to Michel Bats, although the Bituriges Vivisci lay south of the Garonne, they did not belong to the smaller Aquitani that Caesar had defined on ethnic lines, but were reckoned instead among the Gallic peoples in Roman administrative groupings.

== History ==
=== Origins ===
The Bituriges Vivisci are not recorded before the Roman period, and the circumstances of their arrival in the lower Garonne basin remain debated. Caesar names only the Bituriges of Berry, never a western branch. Strabo, writing about 18 AD, is the first to set them apart from the Berry people, whom he calls the Cubi.

The Garumna [Garonne] ... discharges its waters into the region that is between those Bituriges that are surnamed 'Vivisci' and the Santoni—both of them Galatic [Celtic] tribes; for the tribe of these Bituriges is the only tribe of different race that is situated among the Aquitani; and it does not pay tribute to them, (Note: The Greek clause on tribute has been read in more than one way. Ernest Desjardins took it to mean that Bordeaux did not render its taxes jointly with the Aquitani, and Jean Hiernard, after a close study, likewise held that the two peoples paid Rome separately, a reading that would place the notice after the conquest. Robert Étienne instead understood the clause to mean that the Vivisci paid no tribute to the Aquitani, the sense given in the translation quoted here. This last reading is now generally preferred, since it keeps the point of the passage, the contrast between Aquitani and Celts.) though it has an emporium, Burdigala ...

— Strabo 1923, Geōgraphiká 4:2:1, Loeb translation.

Most scholars take them to be a branch of the central Gallic Bituriges installed near the Gironde estuary after the war, although the date and mechanism are disputed. Roger Dion proposed that the migration of the Helvetii in 58 BC had been arranged with the Santones, who controlled the estuary and meant to settle the newcomers there. This reconstruction was later developed by Jean Hiernard, with Rome adopting the same scheme after the war and moving a Biturigan group to weaken a people that had long resisted Caesar. Louis Maurin treats much of this as conjecture. An alliance between the Santones and the Helvetii would have given Caesar an obvious grievance that he never invokes, and the comparison with the Helvetii, a people hundreds of thousands strong, fits poorly the transfer of a single group. Strabo, moreover, places Bordeaux on the left bank in Aquitanian rather than Santonian territory.

Despite these reservations, the settlement of a Biturigan branch in the Bordelais after the Gallic Wars is now generally accepted. Bordeaux, an older trading post on the left bank attested from about 600 BC, roughly doubled in size in the years after the conquest. This phase has been linked to the arrival of the Vivisci between about 50 and 20 BC. The material record is ambiguous. The characteristic pottery of the Berry is absent, and only a few small silver coins of uncertain origin have been linked to the incomers. The settlers held land taken mainly from the Aquitani on the left bank of the Garonne and the estuary, and may later have received ground on the right bank at the expense of the Santones, punished for their part in the revolt of 52 BC. The standing of the site before the conquest is itself debated. Didier Barraud and Christophe Sireix note the close cultural ties linking the communities around the Gironde estuary from the 5th century BC. They take Burdigala to have been an advanced trading place of the Santones in Aquitanian territory until the conquest, after which Rome handed it to the Vivisci.

=== Roman period ===
When Augustus reorganised Gaul about 16 to 13 BC, he constituted the Bituriges Vivisci as a civitas with Burdigala as its chief town. A marble altar dedicated to Augustus and to the Genius of the civitas indicates that Bordeaux gained this rank later than Saintes, though still under Augustus. Like Saintes, it received a sanctuary of the imperial cult, known from Julio-Claudian statues and inscriptions found at the Mont Judaïque. The community was governed by a magistrate styled praetor, a Latin rendering of the Gaulish vergobret. Lengths of wooden water main from the town are stamped R.P.B.V., for res publica Biturigum Viviscorum ('commonwealth of the Bituriges Vivisci'). The early development of Burdigala closely followed that of Mediolanum (Saintes), capital of the neighbouring Santones, with which it shared building techniques and a common ceramic repertoire.

== Economy ==
The ancient sources that credit goods to the Bituriges rarely specify a branch, and several attributions are disputed between the Cubi and the Vivisci. Pliny ascribes to the Bituriges the invention of tinning bronze to imitate silver, a method later applied to horse harness. Robert Étienne assigned this metalworking to the Vivisci on the strength of their place in the tin trade, while others have associated it with the Cubi.

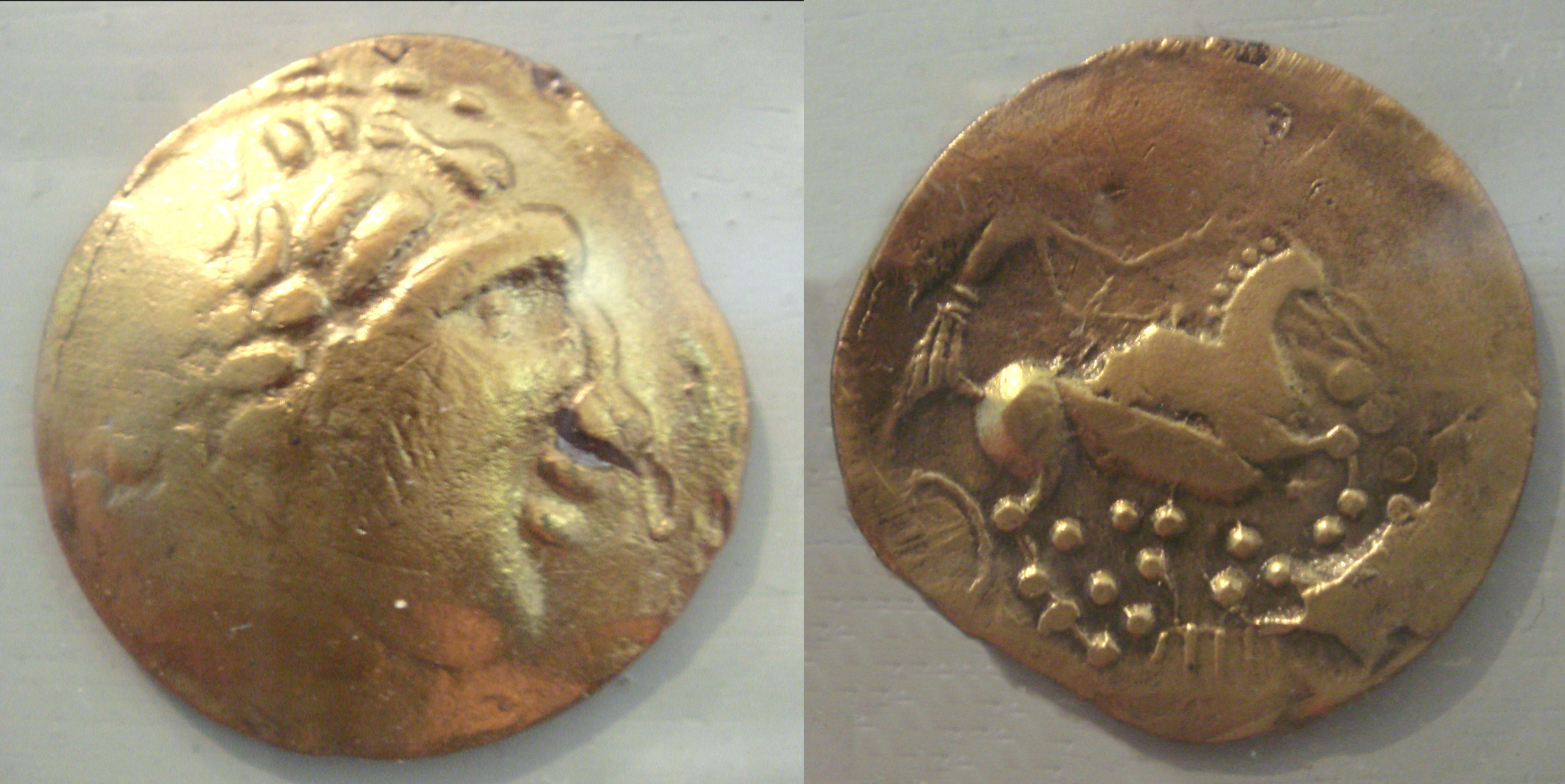
Coins of the Bituriges Vivisci

The grape variety Vitis biturica, named after the Bituriges and recorded by Columella, Pliny and Isidore of Seville, raises the same question. It was long credited to the Vivisci and treated as an ancestor of the wines of Bordeaux. More recent work reassigns it to the Cubi. The arguments are the frost resistance of the variety, which suits the continental interior of the Berry rather than the milder estuary, Isidore's note that the vine took its name from its region of origin, and earliest archaeological evidence for viticulture in the territory of the Cubi.

Excavations in the old centre of Bordeaux have produced a substantial body of pre-Augustan coinage, dominated by local bronze issues of Pictonian and Santonian type bearing the name Contoutos, and by small silver fractions known as aquitaniques or girondines. Find contexts place them between about 50 and 30 BC. Their resemblance to the coinage of the Bituriges Cubi has suggested a possible connection with the arrival of the Vivisci, though the link remains tentative. However, a true monetary economy appears at Bordeaux only after the conquest, with the main influx of coinage occurring around 40 to 30 BC as the new administration took hold.

== See also ==
- Bituriges Cubi
