= Medulli (Aquitania) =

Ancient tribe

The Medulli were an ancient Gallic tribe living in Aquitania during the Roman period. Their territory, corresponding to the Medilicus pagus (modern Médoc), appear to have constituted a pagus of the Bituriges Vivisci from an early date. Their region was already renowned in Antiquity for the quality of its oyster production, praised by Pliny in the 1st century AD and later mentioned by Ausonius (4th century) and Sidonius Apollinaris (5th century).

== Name ==
They are mentioned as Medulli by Ausonius (4th c. AD) and Sidonius Apollinaris (5th c. AD).

The ethnonym Medulli is a latinized form of Gaulish Medulloi. It is generally derived from the Celtic root medu-, meaning 'mead, alcoholic drink' (cf. Olr. mid, MW. medd, OBret. medot), and thus may be translated as 'those who drink mead' or 'those inebriated by mead'. Alternatively, Javier de Hoz has proposed to interpret the name as 'those who lived in the middle', or 'in the border woods', by connecting it to the stem *medhi- ('middle').

The toponym Médoc (attested as pagus Medulicus) is named after the tribe.

They had an homonym tribe, the Medulli in Gallia Alpina.

== Geography ==
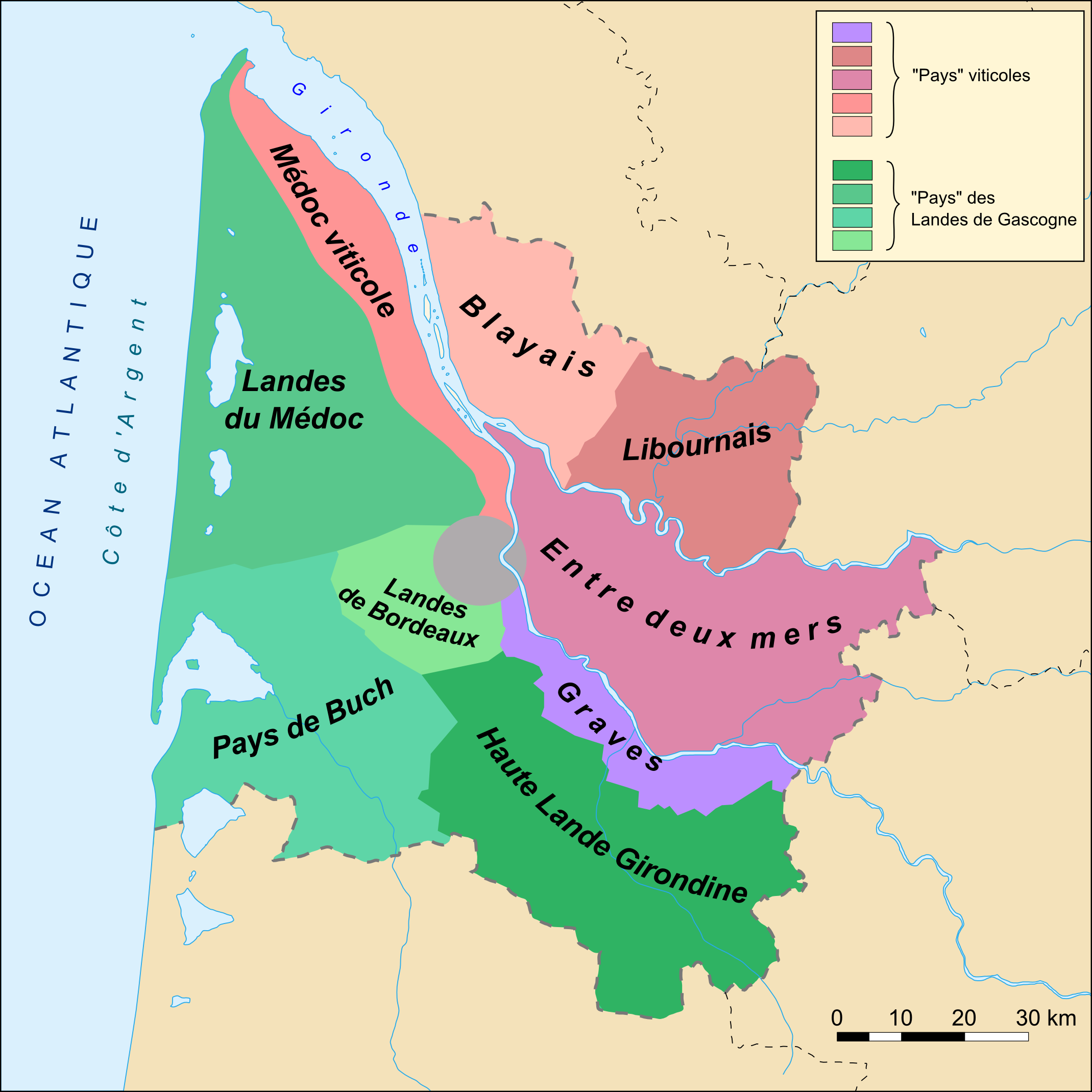
Map of the Gironde estuary, with the Médoc

A pagus Medulicus is attested as a district (pagus) of the civitas of the Bituriges Vivisci in an inscription from Bordeaux. In the 1st century AD, Pliny praises the quality of Medullian oysters ("sweeter in the Medullian [region]"; suaviora Medullis), yet does not mention the Medulli as a people among the Aquitanian tribes. This silence that led Camille Jullian to conclude that they already formed a pagus dependent on the Bituriges prior to the Roman conquest.

In the 4th century AD, Ausonius repeatedly refers in his letters to Medullian oysters ("Oysters ... which the ebbing tide of the returning sea improves in the sweet lagoons of the Medulli") and also mentions a pagus called paganum Medulis.

In the 5th century AD, Sidonius Apollinaris likewise alludes to the "Medullian products" (Medullicae supellectili) in a letter to his friend Trigetius.
