= Trigoso =

- frazione
- Interactive map of Trigoso
- Coordinates: 44°16′N 9°26′E
- Country: Italy
- Region: Liguria
- Province: Metropolitan City of Genoa
- Comune: Sestri Levante

Trigoso (earlier, Tregoso, Latin: Tigullia) is a frazione in the comune of Sestri Levante, Metropolitan City of Genoa, Liguria, Italy. It was the site of the ancient city of Tigullia, which belonged to the Ligurian tribe named Tigullii, and noted by Pliny the Elder. It is approximately 2 miles (3.2 km) inland from the centre of Sestri Levante and contains considerable Roman remains. It is probable, also, that the Tegulata of the Antonine Itineraries is identical with the Tigullia of Pliny.
