= Bagnun =

Italian soup

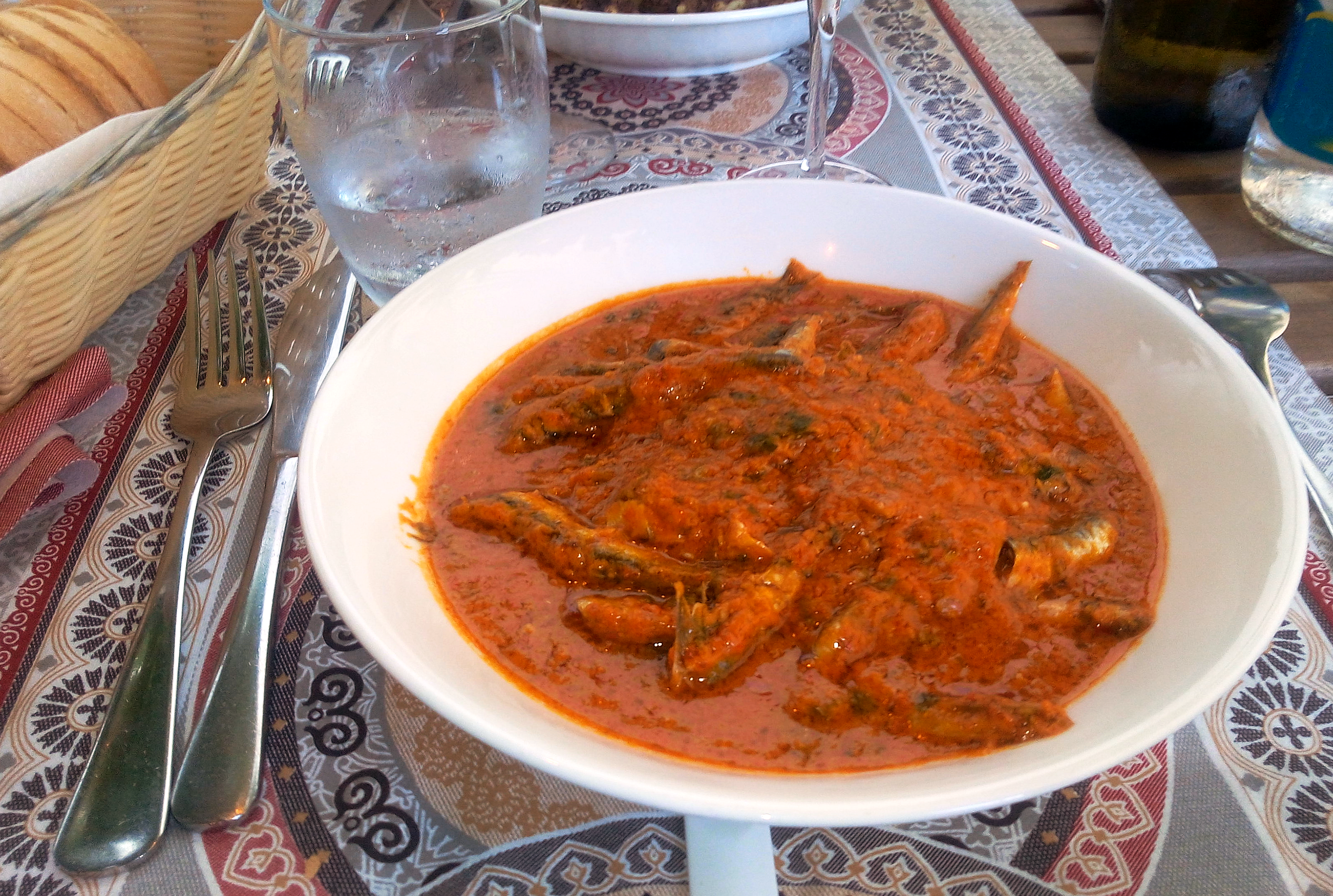
- Type: Soup
- Course: Primo (Italian course)
- Place of origin: Italy
- Region or state: Genoa, Liguria
- Main ingredients: Anchovies, brown onions, tomatoes, extra virgin olive oil, dry bread

Bagnun is a soup, with anchovies as the primary ingredient, which originated in the 19th century near Sestri Levante, in the province of Genoa, Italy.

== History ==
Originally, bagnun was cooked by the crews of typical fishing boats called "leudi". Over time, it has kept its original simplicity: it is prepared, even today, with fresh anchovies, brown onions, peeled tomatoes, extra virgin olive oil and dry bread.

Since the 1950s, Riva Trigoso, a village near the town of Sestri Levante, has held an annual Sagra del Bagnun, a festival celebrating the dish, in the last weekend of July.

== See also ==
- Cuisine of Liguria
- List of Italian soups
