= Caturiges =

Gallic tribe

The Caturiges (Gaulish: Caturīges, 'kings of combat') were a Gallic tribe dwelling in the upper Durance valley, around present-day towns of Chorges and Embrun, during the Iron Age and the Roman period.

== Name ==
They are mentioned as Caturiges by Caesar (mid-1st c. BC) and Pliny (1st c. AD), and as Katourgídōn (Κατουργίδων) by Ptolemy (2nd c. AD).

The Gaulish ethnonym Caturīges (sing. Caturīx) literally means 'kings of combat'. It stems from the Celtic root catu- ('combat, battle') attached to rīges ('kings').

The city of Chorges, attested in the 4th c. AD as Caturrigas (Cadorgas in 1062, Chaorgias in 1338), is named after the tribe.

== Geography ==
=== Territory ===
The Caturiges dwelled in the upper course of the Durance river. The Barrington Atlas locates their territory of the Tricorii, Avantici and Edenates (further west lived the Vocontii), south of the Brigianii and Quariates, west of the Veneni and Soti, and north of the Savincates. They were probably clients to the larger Vocontian people as part of their confederation.

Initially part of the province of Alpes Cottiae after the Roman conquest, the Caturiges were integrated into the province of Alpes Maritimae during the reign of Diocletian (284–305 AD).

=== Settlements ===
Their chief town was known as Eburodunum (modern Embrun), located on a rocky plinth that dominated the Durance river. It was an important station on the route between Gaul the Italian Peninsula. After the western part of the province of Alpes Cottiae was transferred to the Alpes Maritimae under Diocletian (284–305), Eburodunum replaced Cemenelum as the capital of the Alpes Maritimae.

Caturigomagus ('market of the Caturiges'; modern Chorges) was a frontier city located on the route to Italy via the Col de Montgenèvre, in the western part of the Caturigian territory near the border between the Regnum Cottii and the Vocontian confederation. Probably outshined by the neighbouring Eburodunum and Vappincum (Gap), the city declined in the 4th century AD and was not listed as civitates by the Notitia Galliarum ca. 400.

== History ==
=== Origin ===
According to Pliny, the Caturiges originated as a group of exiles from the Insubres of northern Italy.

Other communities that have perished are the Caturiges, an exiled section of the Insubrians...

— Pliny 1938, Naturalis Historia, 3:125.

The presence of a cult to Mars Caturix in a town also named Eburodunum (Yverdon-les-Bains, Switzerland) on the southern shore of Lac Neuchâtel of has been noted. Further occurrences in the Barrois region (Caturrigis, the ancient name of Bar-le-Duc), and possibly in Haute-Savoie, have been interpreted as traces of ancient migrations, although neither their chronology nor their direction can be determined.

The Ligurian tribes of the Bagienni and the Veneni seem to derive from a southward migration of the Caturiges.

The more celebrated of the Ligurian tribes beyond the Alps are the Salluvii, the Deciates, and the Oxubii; on this side of the Alps, the Veneni and the Vagienni, who are derived from the Caturiges.

— Pliny the Elder (1st century).

=== Roman conquest ===
In the mid-first century BC, the Caturiges are mentioned by Julius Caesar as a tribe hostile to Rome. In what appears to be a concerted attack, they attempted to prevent his passage through the upper Durance along with the Ceutrones and Graioceli in 58 BC.

There [Titus Labienus] enrolled two legions, and brought out of winter quarters three that were wintering about Aquileia; and with these five legions made speed to march by the shortest route to Further Gaul, over the Alps. In that region the Ceutrones, the Graioceli, and the Caturiges, seizing points on the higher ground, essayed to stop the march of his army. They were repulsed in several actions; and on the seventh day he moved from Ocelum, the last station of Hither Gaul, into the borders of the Vocontii in Further Gaul.

— Caesar 1917, Commentarii de Bello Gallico, 1:10:4.

They are mentioned by Pliny the Elder as one of the Alpine tribes conquered by Rome in 16–15 BC, and whose name was engraved on the Tropaeum Alpium. They also appear on the Arch of Susa, erected by Cottius in 9–8 BC.

== See also ==
- Ceutrones
- Graioceli
- Vocontii
