= Medulli (Narbonensis) =

Gallic tribe

The Medulli (Gaulish: Medulloi) were a Gallic tribe dwelling in the upper valley of Maurienne, around present-day Modane (Savoie), during the Iron Age and Roman period.

== Name ==
They are named as Medulli by Vitruvius (in the genitive case as Medullorum, late 1st c. BC), Méd(o)ulloi (Μέδ<ο>υλλοι) by Strabo (early 1st c. AD), Medulli by Pliny (1st c. AD), and as Medoúllous (Μεδούλλους) by Ptolemy (2nd c. AD).

The ethnonym Medulli is a latinized form of Gaulish Medulloi. It is generally derived from the Celtic root medu-, meaning 'mead, alcoholic drink' (cf. Olr. mid, MW. medd, OBret. medot), and thus may be translated as 'those who drink mead' or 'those inebriated by mead'. This interpretation is encouraged by the mention, in Vitruvius' De architectura, of a "kind of water" (genus aquae) drunk by the Medulli. Alternatively, Javier de Hoz has proposed to interpret the name as 'those who lived in the middle', or 'in the border woods', by connecting it to the stem *medhi- ('middle').

== Geography ==
The Medulli dwelled in the upper Maurienne valley, along the upper course of the Arc river, near the modern town of Modane (Amonada). The Barrington Atlas locates their territory east of the Graioceli (themselves east of the Vocontii), north of the Brigianii and Quariates, west of the Segusini, and south of the Ceutrones (themselves south of the Allobroges).

They belonged to the tribes governed by Cottius in Alpes Taurinae and were later integrated into the province of Alpes Cottiae.

== History ==
They are mentioned by Pliny the Elder as one of the Alpine tribes conquered by Rome in 16–15 BC, and whose name was engraved on the Tropaeum Alpium. They also appear on the Arch of Susa, erected by Cottius in 9–8 BC.

According to Vitruvius, they were particularly prone to suffer from goitre.

Among the Aquiculi in Italy and among the tribe of the Medulli in the Alps, there is a kind of water which causes goitre among those who drink it.

— Vitruvius 1934, De Architectura, 8:3:20.

== See also ==
- Ceutrones
- Graioceli
- Segusini
