= Médoc =

Region in Gironde, Nouvelle-Aquitaine, France

Coordinates: 45°00′N 1°00′W

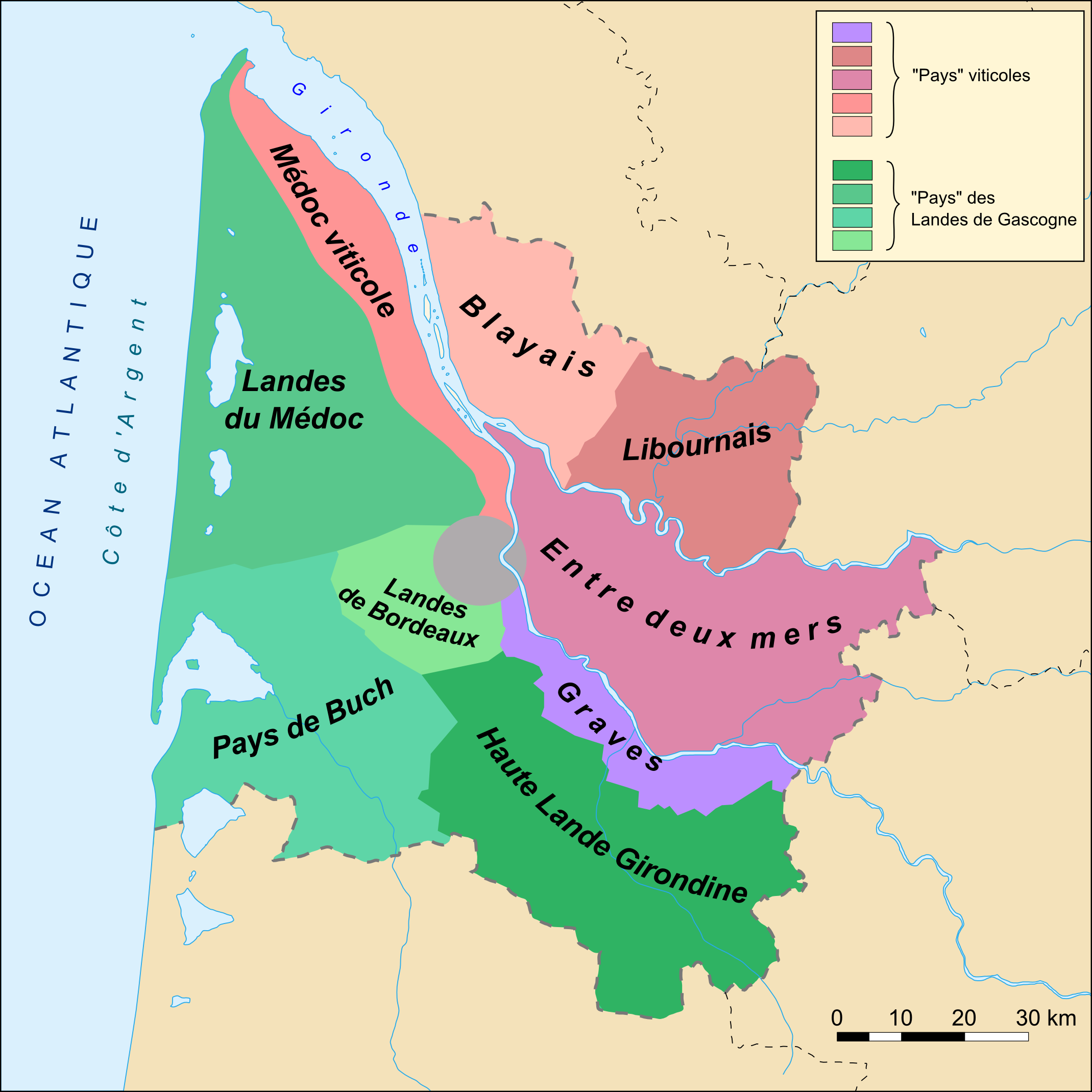
Map of the Gironde estuary

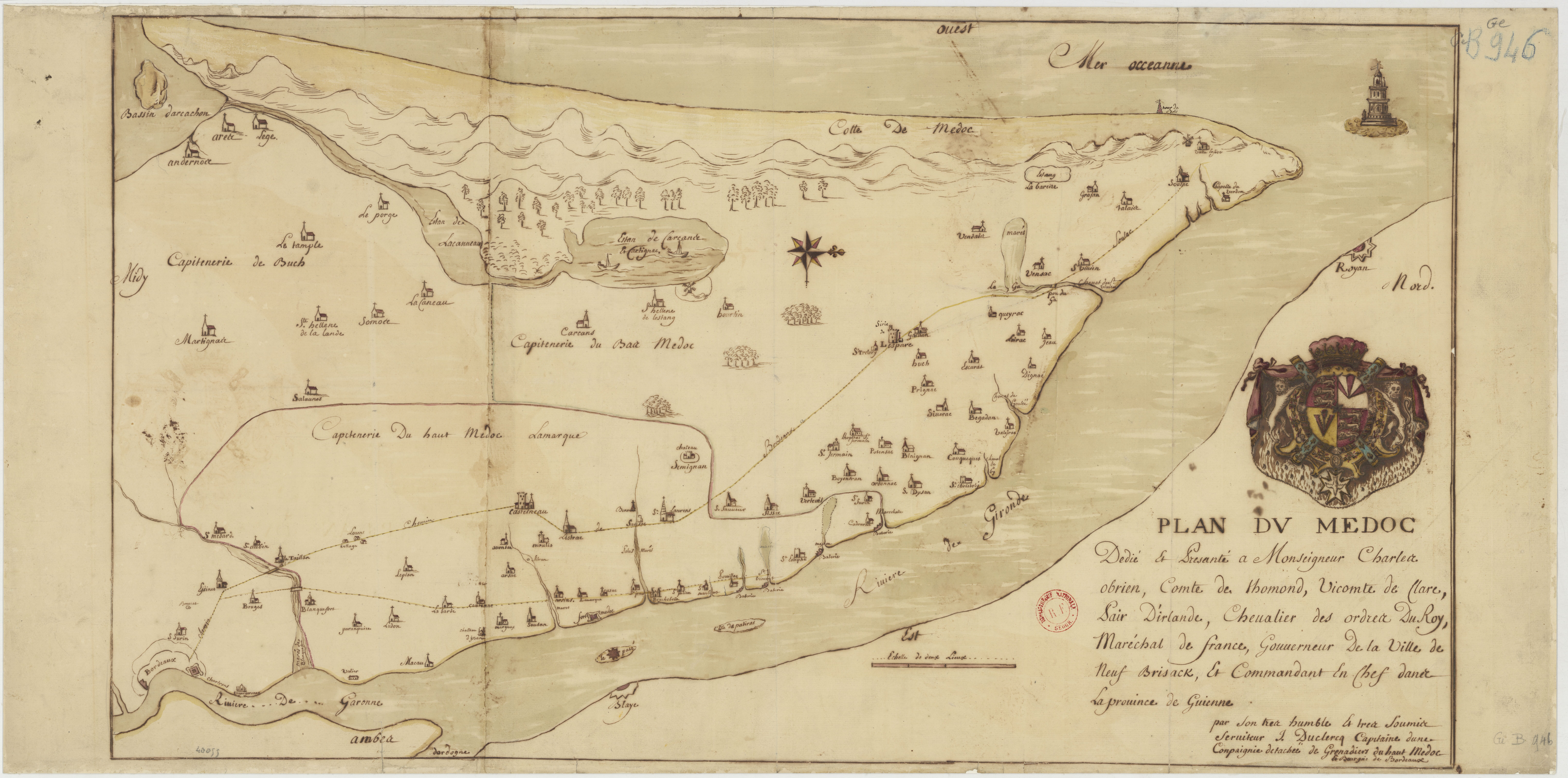
18th-century map (West at top) of Médoc, produced for Charles O'Brien, 8th Earl of Thomond.

The Médoc (French pronunciation: [meˈdɔk]; Gascon: Medòc [meˈðɔk]) is a region of France, well known as a wine growing region, located in the département of Gironde, on the left bank of the Gironde estuary, northwest of Bordeaux. The region owes its economic success mainly to the production of red wine; it is home to around 1,500 vineyards.

== Name ==
Its name comes from pagus Medullicus ('country of the Medulli', the ancient Celtic tribe that occupied this region).

== Geography ==
The area also has pine forests and long sandy beaches. The Médoc's geography is not ideal for wine grape growing, with its proximity to the Atlantic Ocean resulting in a comparatively mild climate and high rainfall making grape rot a constant problem. It is generally believed that the nature of the region's wine derives from the soil; although the terrain is flat, excellent drainage is present and the increased amount of gravel in the soil allows heat to be retained, encouraging ripening, and extensive root systems.

== Viticulture ==
With the exception of Château Haut-Brion from Graves, all of the red wines in the 1855 Classification are from the Médoc. Many of the Médoc wines that are not in this classification were classified using the Cru Bourgeois system until 2007. Following legal challenges this category was abolished, and reintroduced in 2010 as an annual "mark of quality" depending on independent annual assessment.

== See also ==
- Bordeaux wine regions
