= Tigullio =

Traditional region in Genoa

Tigullio Gulf of Tigullio
- Traditional Region
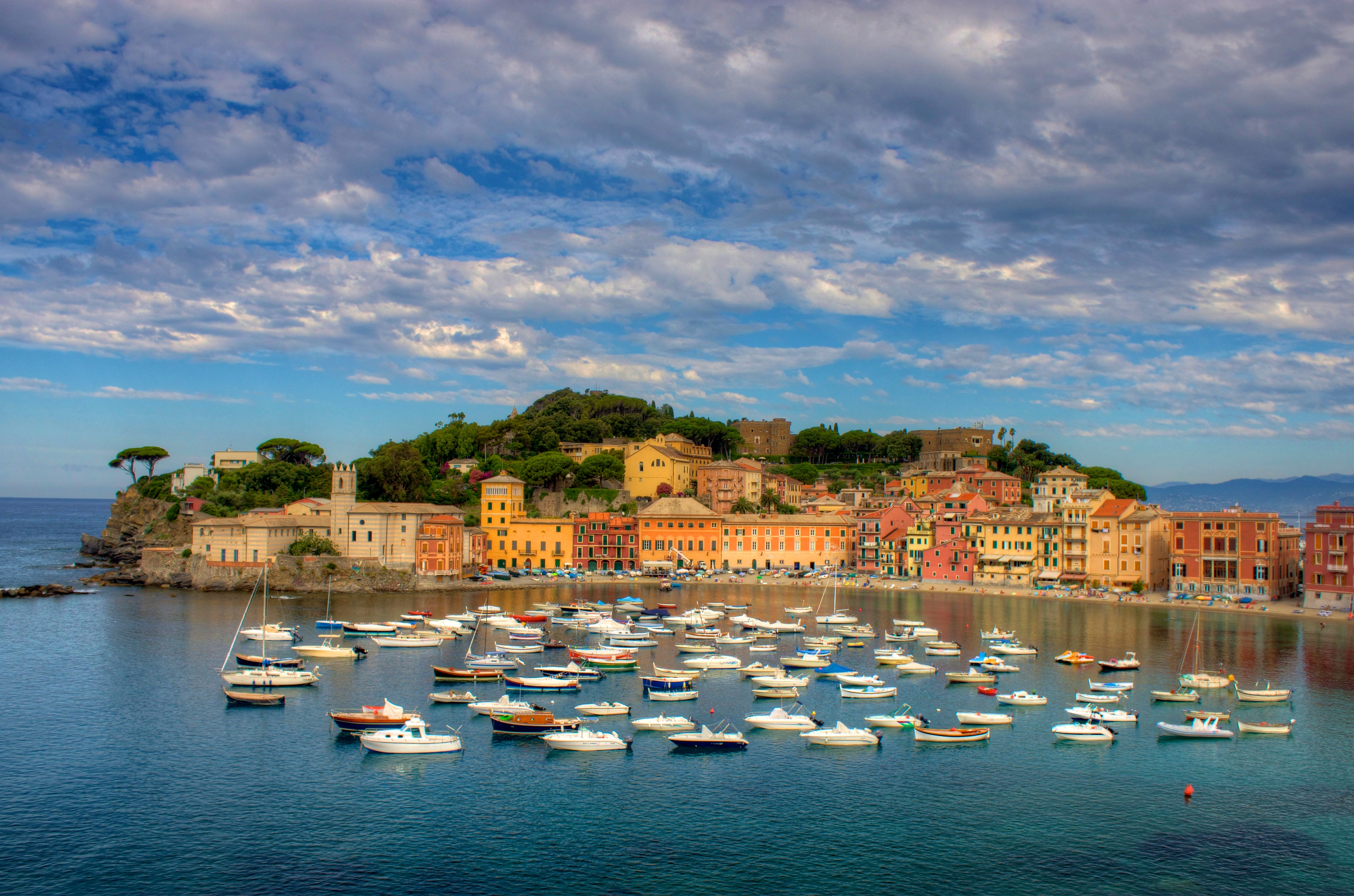
- Sestri Levante and Baia del Silenzio, the Bay of Silence

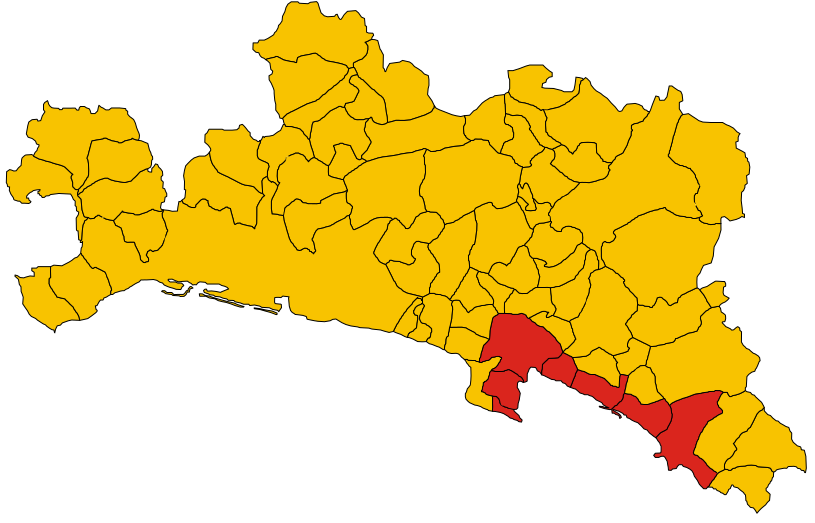
- The coastal municipalities overlooking the Gulf of Tigullio within the Metropolitan City of Genoa
- Coordinates: 44.3000°N 9.2833°E

Area
  - Total: 113.70 km^{2} (43.90 sq mi)

Population (2017)
  - Total: 100,707
  - Density: 885.73/km^{2} (2,294.0/sq mi)

Tigullio is a traditional region and a gulf in the Metropolitan City of Genoa, Liguria, northern Italy. Part of the Riviera di Levante, it includes the communes of (from West to East) Portofino, Santa Margherita Ligure, Rapallo, Zoagli, Chiavari, Lavagna and Sestri Levante. The name derives from the ancient Ligurian tribe, Tigullii.

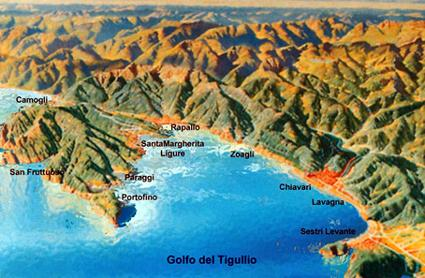
Diagrammatic aerial view showing the main communes of Tigullio.
