= Sestri Levante =

- Comune
- Comune di Sestri Levante
- Aerial view of Sestri Levante

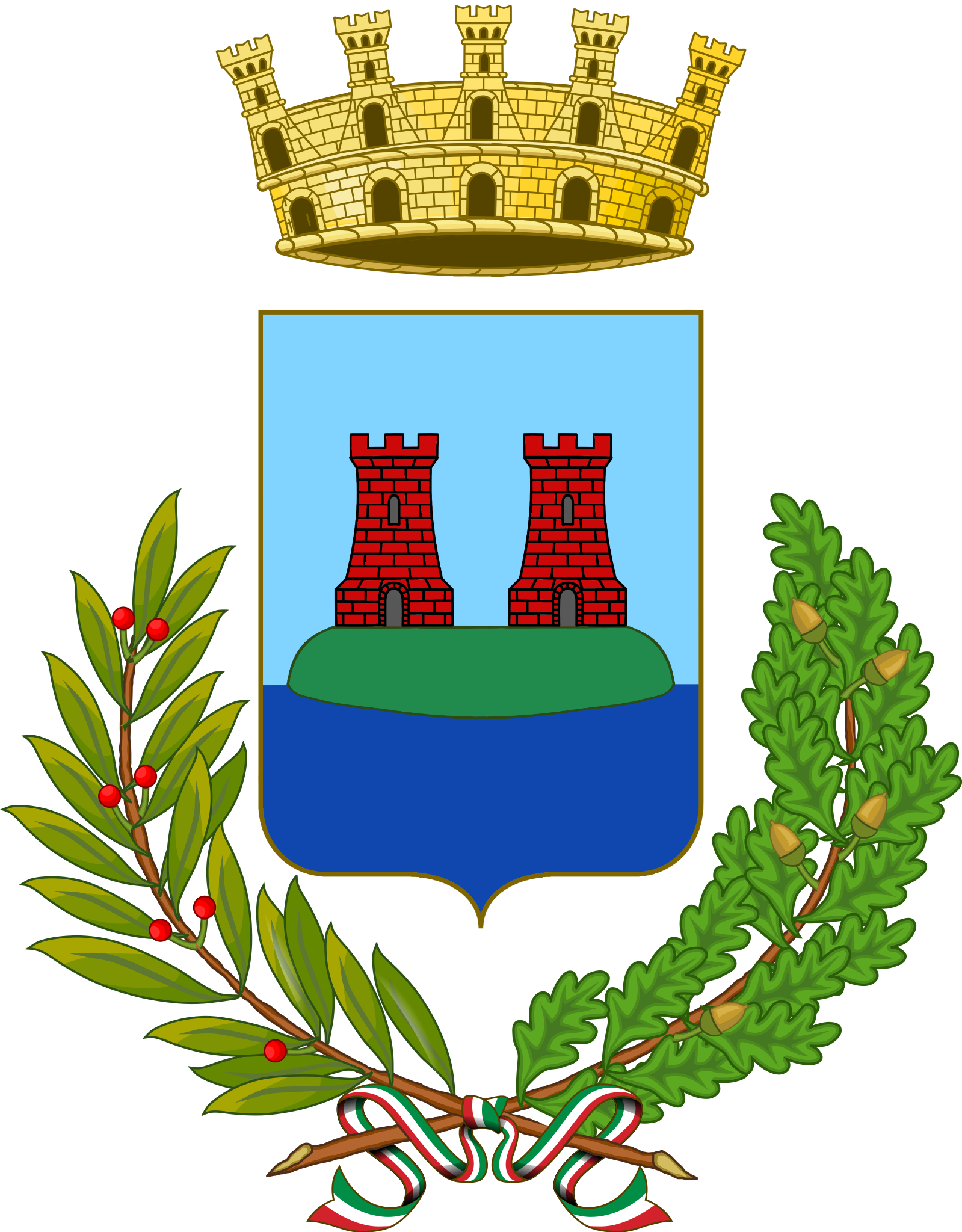
- Coat of arms

- Location within Italy Location within Liguria
- Coordinates: 44°16′N 9°24′E
- Country: Italy
- Region: Liguria
- Metropolitan city: Genoa (GE)
- Frazioni: Azaro, Balicca Ponterotto, Cascine, Fossa Lupara, Ginestra, Libiola, Loto, Montedomenico, Riva Trigoso, Rovereto, San Quillico, San Bartolomeo, San Bernardo, Santa Margherita di Fossa Lupara, Santa Vittoria di Libiola, Tassani, Trigoso, Vignolo, Villa Arpe, Villa Campomoneto, Villa Carmelo, Villa Costa, Villa Costarossa, Villa Fontane, Villa Manierta, Villa Rocca, Villa Rocche, Villa San Bernardino, Villa Scorza, Villa Staffora, Villa Zarello

Government
  - Mayor: Francesco Solinas

Area
  - Total: 33.33 km^{2} (12.87 sq mi)
- Elevation: 1 m (3.3 ft)

Population (31 December 2011)
  - Total: 18,177
  - Density: 545.4/km^{2} (1,412/sq mi)
- Demonym: Sestrini
- Time zone: UTC+1 (CET)
  - Summer (DST): UTC+2 (CEST)
- Postal code: 16039
- Dialing code: 0185
- Patron saint: Saint Nicholas and Saint John the Baptist
- Saint day: December 6 and June 24
- Website: Official website

Sestri Levante (Latin: Segesta Tigullorum/Segesta Tigulliorum) is a town and comune in the Metropolitan City of Genoa, Liguria, Italy. Lying on the Ligurian Sea, it is set on a promontory approximately 40 km (25 miles) south-east of Genoa. Nearby Portofino and the Cinque Terre are better-known as tourist destinations on the Italian Riviera, but Sestri Levante has become popular among Italians. This once quiet fishing village is now popular with tourists, and has an old and a new town.

== Geography ==
Sestri Levante is approximately halfway between Genoa and La Spezia. The town has two bays: Baia delle Favole (Bay of the Fables) and Baia del Silenzio (Bay of Silence). The oldest part of Sestri Levante is on a peninsula between the two bays. Baia delle Favole is named in honor of the Danish writer, Hans Christian Andersen, who lived in Sestri Levante for a short time in 1833.

== History ==
Sestri Levante originated as a maritime and merchant center. Originally a small island, it was later connected to the mainland. In Roman times, it was known as Segesta Tigullorum (or Tigulliorum) or simply Segesta, but the place was nearly abandoned when the Roman empire collapsed. It seems to have belonged to the Ligurian tribe of the Tigullii. It was mentioned again in the year 909 in a certificate of Berengar I of Italy, in which part of its territory was ceded to the basilica di San Giovanni di Pavia. During the Middle Ages, Sestri Levante began to expand, probably giving the fortress appearance that is due to the terrain.

In 1133, the noble family of Lavagna, the Fieschi, attacked Tigullio, the gulf in which Sestri Levante is located, however, they were repelled by the powerful Republic of Genoa, and Sestri Levante became a part of the republic for military protection. In 1145, the abbey of San Colombano was acquired by the Genoese, and was transformed later into a castle.

In 1170, Sestri Levante was attacked by a naval flotilla from Pisa, but was able to withstand the attack.

== Economy ==
Cantiere navale di Riva Trigoso is a shipyard founded in 1897 by Erasmo Piaggio in Riva Trigoso which mostly built commercial ships. In 1925, the Piaggio heirs spun off the drydock business and renamed the company Cantieri del Tirreno. It diversified into building warships and was heavily damaged during World War II. The shipyard was merged into Italcantieri in 1973 and then into Fincantieri in 1984.

== Cuisine ==
Sestri Levante is known for bagnun, a soup of fresh anchovies, onions and basil. In the past, it was usually associated with the summer and the sailors in Sestri Levante, but now it is eaten year round by all kinds of residents, typically accompanied by country-style bread. There is a bagnun festival on the second-to-last weekend of July.

== Sport ==
Sestri Levante is home to the football club U.S.D. Sestri Levante 1919, which played Serie C Group B in the 2023-24 season. The club has mostly competed in regional level Italian competitions, with three seasons in Serie C from 1946–1949. Its home ground is the Stadio Giuseppe Sivori.

== Cultural events ==
- The Andersen Prize, a literary competition for children and young people, is awarded in the spring. Each year many stories participates from all over the world, in several languages.
- The Riviera International Film Festival exhibits new films of various genres from around the world. It is held between end of April and early May.
- Tigullio Ocean Racing Challenge. It is a competition between the towns of Tigullio (Santa Margherita Ligure, San Michele di Pagana, Rapallo, Zoagli, Chiavari, Lavagna and Sestri Levante) that takes place between June and August.
- Sagra del Bagnun is a local fair held in Riva Ponente dedicated to bagnun, a local seafood soup. It is celebrated the second-to-last weekend in July.
- Barcarolata is celebrated the last Sunday of August. There is a parade of boats decorated in the most fanciful way, in the area of the Bay of Silence.

== Cultural depictions ==
- Sestri Levante is mentioned by Dante Alighieri (as "Siestri") in Canto 19 of The Divine Comedy.
- The short horror story "Caterpillars," by E. F. Benson, is set near the Riviera town of Sestri di Levante [sic].
- "Sestri Levante" is also a song by Australian band Tame Impala, and appeared on their album Live Versions.
- Depiction in Rome: Total War. In the 2004 PC video game Rome: Total War, capturing Segesta (Sestri Levante) will always be the first mission the player receives if they have chosen to play as the Julii faction. The conquest of the city is thus often seen as a first step towards the expansion of the Republic by the player.

== Twin towns and sister cities ==
Sestri Levante is twinned with:

- Dole, France
- Santa Cruz, United States
- Portocannone, Italy

== Notable people ==
- Bruno Baveni, footballer
- Ermes Paterlini, footballer
- Carlo Bo, Italian Poet and Politician

== Gallery ==
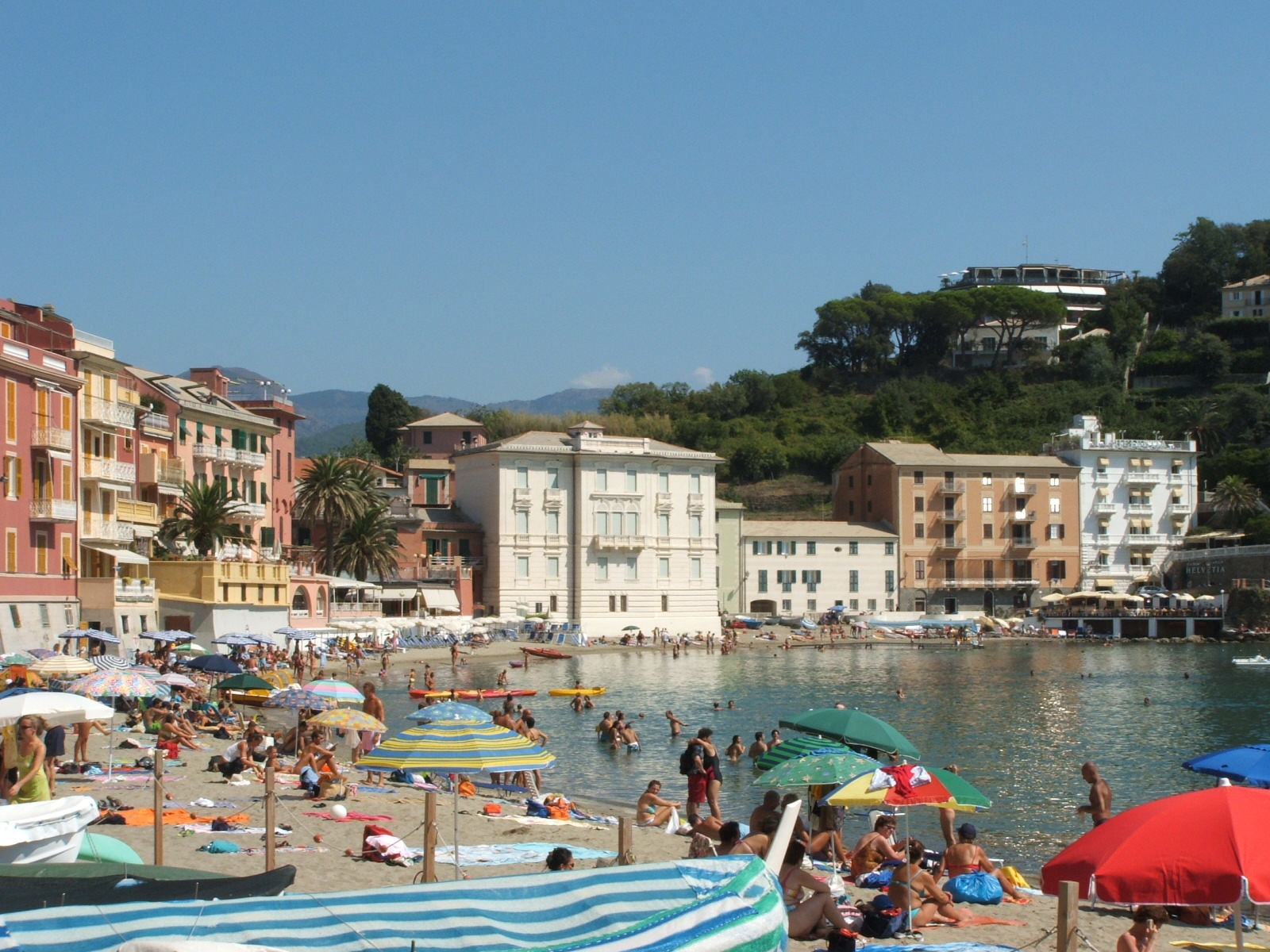
View

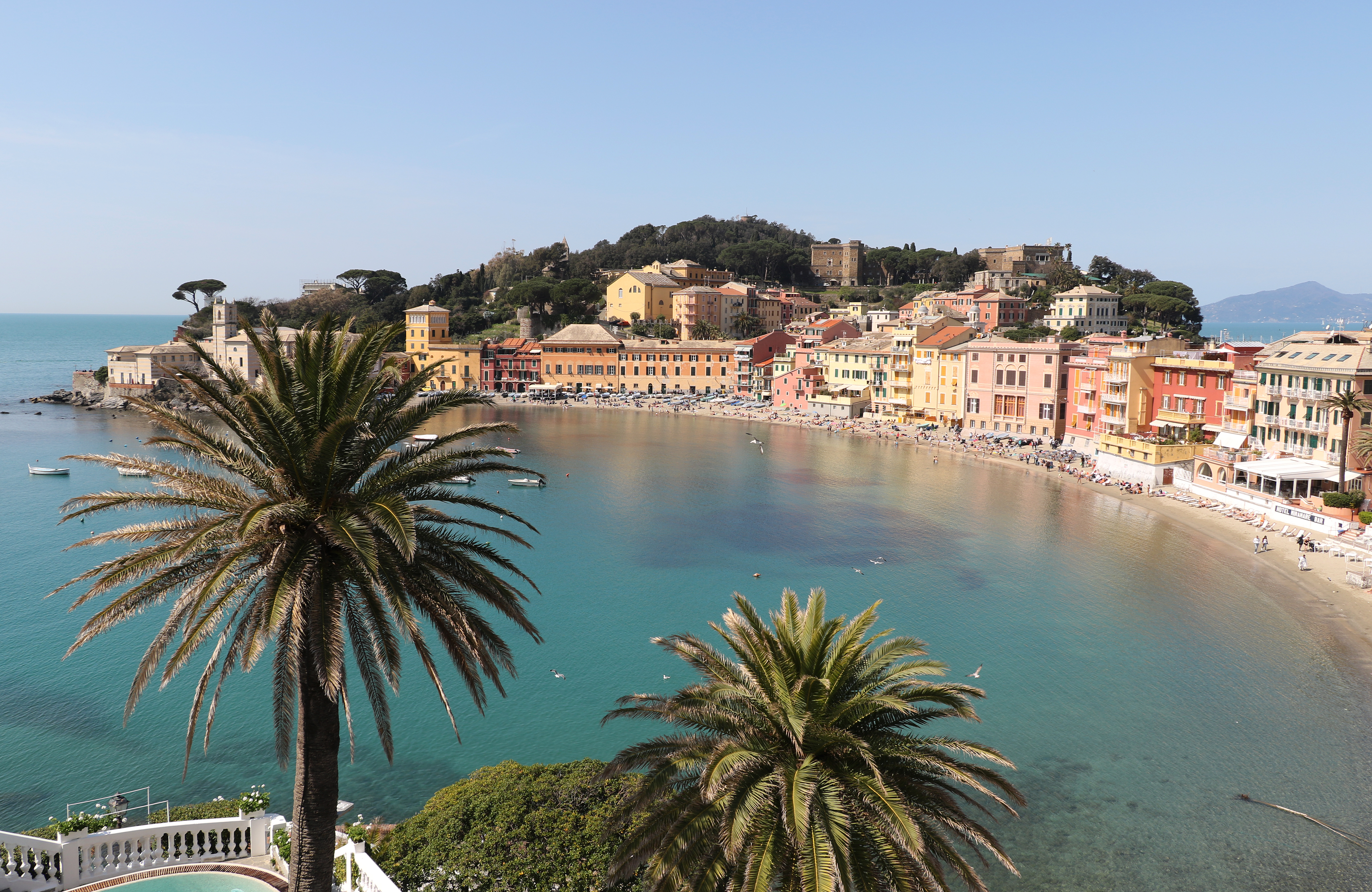
Bay of Silence

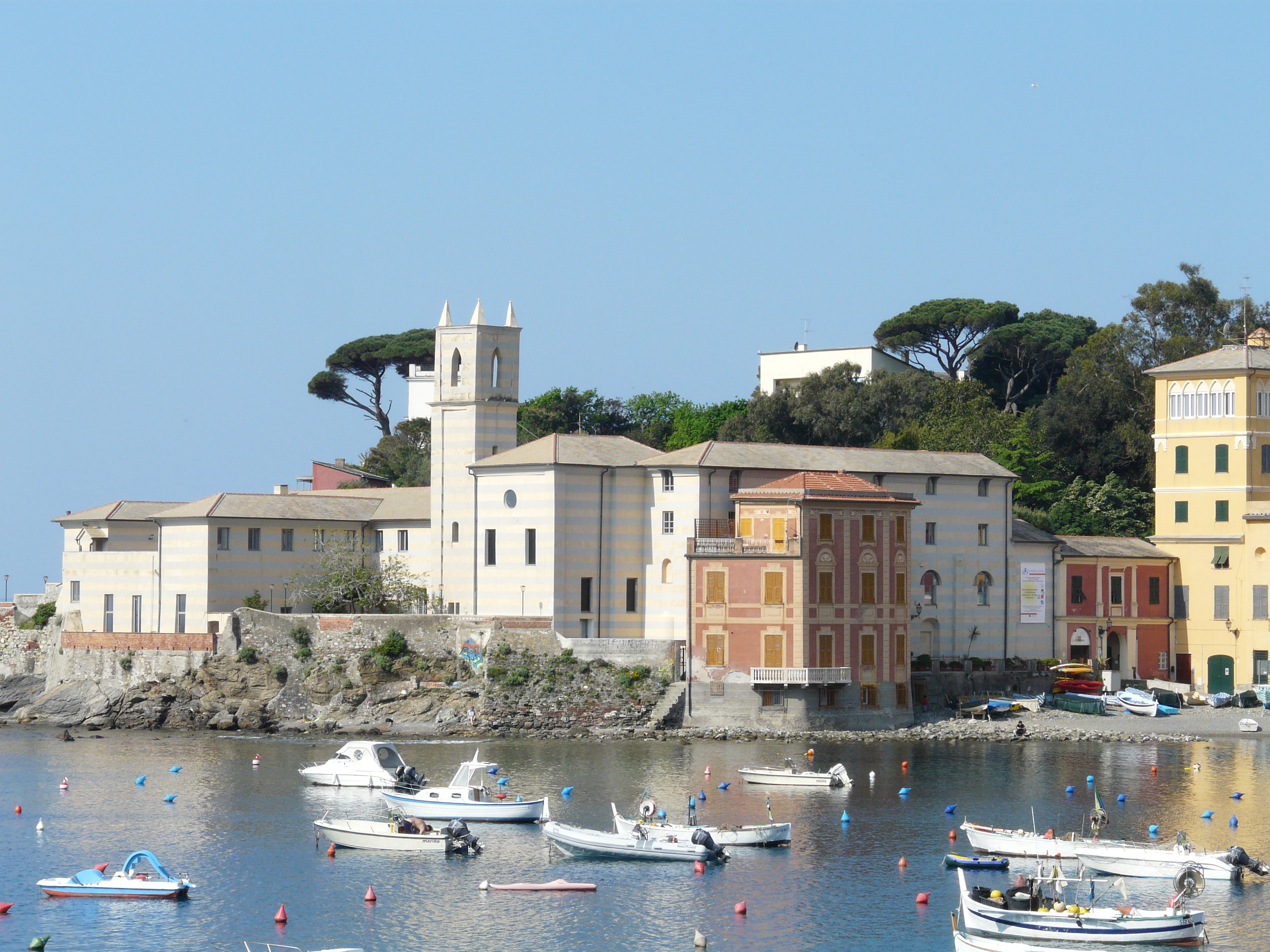
The Annunciation Monastery

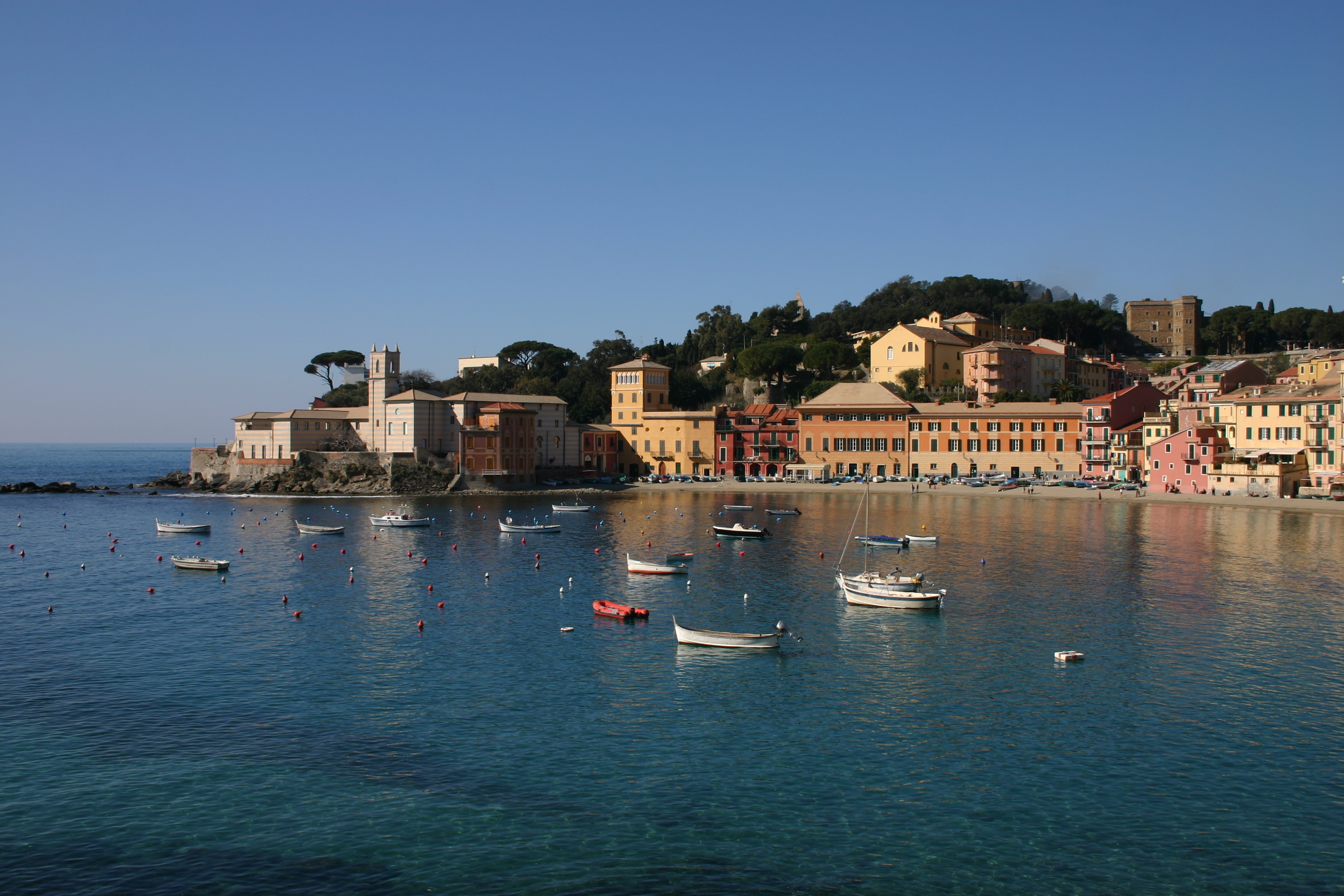
View

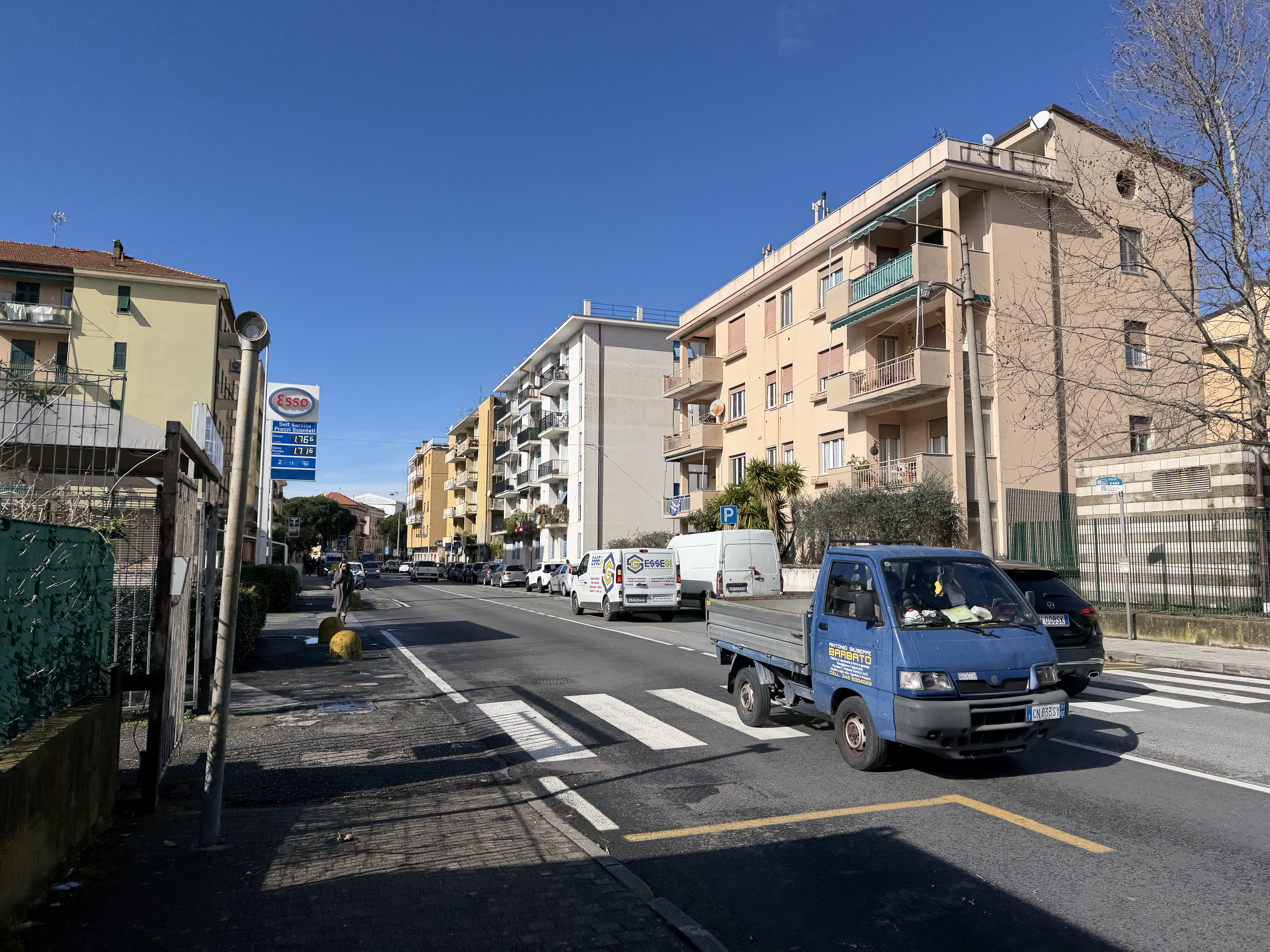
Street view
