= Graioceli =

Gallic tribe

medThe Graioceli were a small Gallic tribe dwelling in the valley of Maurienne, in the modern region of Savoie, during the Iron Age.

== Name ==
They are mentioned as Graioceli (var. graiocaeli, gaioceli) by Caesar (mid-1st c. BC).

The etymology of the ethnonym Graioceli remains unclear. It possibly contains a divine name *Graios (found in Herculi/Herculeio Graio) attached to the Gaulish root ocel-, meaning 'peak, summit, promontory'. The same stem is also present in the name of the Alpes Graiae.

== Geography ==
The Graioceli dwelled in the Maurienne Valley, around the modern towns of Saint-Jean-de-Maurienne and Saint-Jean-d'Arves. The Barrington Atlas locates their territory southeast of the Allobroges, south of the Ceutrones, north of the Ucennii, and west of the Medulli.

== History ==
In the mid-first century BC, the Graioceli are mentioned by Julius Caesar as a tribe hostile to Rome. In what appears to be a concerted attack, they attempted to prevent his passage through the upper Durance alongside the Ceutrones and Caturiges in 58 BC.

There [Titus Labienus] enrolled two legions, and brought out of winter quarters three that were wintering about Aquileia; and with these five legions made speed to march by the shortest route to Further Gaul, over the Alps. In that region the Ceutrones, the Graioceli, and the Caturiges, seizing points on the higher ground, essayed to stop the march of his army. They were repulsed in several actions; and on the seventh day he moved from Ocelum, the last station of Hither Gaul, into the borders of the Vocontii in Further Gaul.

— Caesar 1917, Commentarii de Bello Gallico, 1:10:4.

== See also ==
- Caturiges
- Medulli
