= Marici (tribe) =

Celto-Ligurian tribe

The Marici were a Celto-Ligurian tribe dwelling around present-day Pavia (Lombardy) during the Iron Age.

== Name ==
The ethnic name Marici can be translated as 'the big ones', from the Celtic stem maro- ('tall'). According to Patrizia de Bernardo Stempel, such linguistically Celtic tribal names suggest that a Celto-Ligurian dialect played an important role among the languages spoken in ancient Ligury.

== Geography ==
The Marici lived around the modern town of Pavia. The Barrington Atlas locates their territory south of the Laevi, east of the Iadatini, west of the Cenomani, north of the Anamares.

== History ==
In the Third Book of his Natural History, Pliny the Elder identifies them as the co-founders, along with the Laevi, of Ticinum, the modern Pavia.

== Bibliography ==
- de Bernardo Stempel, Patrizia (2006). "From Ligury to Spain: Unaccented *yo > (y)e in Narbonensic votives ('gaulish' DEKANTEM), Hispanic coins ('iberian' -(sk)en) and some theonyms". Palaeohispanica. 6: 45–58. ISSN 1578-5386.
- Talbert, Richard J. A. (2000). Barrington Atlas of the Greek and Roman World. Princeton University Press. ISBN 978-0691031699.
