= Tricorii =

Ancient Gallic tribe

The Tricorii were a Gallic tribe living in the Drac valley, in the Dauphiné Prealps, during the Iron Age and the Roman period. They are attested in ancient sources primarily in connection with Hannibal's crossing of the Alps in 218 BC, and later with the Helvetii migration into Gaul in 58 BC during the Gallic Wars. The Tricorii did not form a civitas under the Roman Empire and appear to have been either subdued by Rome at an earlier date or assimilated into a neighbouring people after the Roman conquest.

== Name ==
They are mentioned as Trikórioi (Τρικόριοι) by Strabo (early 1st c. AD), Trigorios by Livy (1st c. AD), Tríkourous (Τρίκουρους) by Appian (2nd c. AD), and as Tricorios by Ammianus Marcellinus (4th c. AD).

The Gaulish ethnonym Tricorii means 'three armies', or 'three troops'. It derives from the Gaulish stem tri- ('three') attached to corios ('army'), after a Gallic custom of including numbers in tribal names (e.g. Vo-contii, Vo-corii, Petro-corii).

Some scholars have also compared the ethnonym Tricorii with the Breton toponym pagus Tricurīnus (modern Trégor in Brittany) and the 7th-century Brittonic toponym Tricurius (modern Trigg in Cornwall).

They must be distinguished from the Tricores, who lived further south near Massalia.

== Geography ==
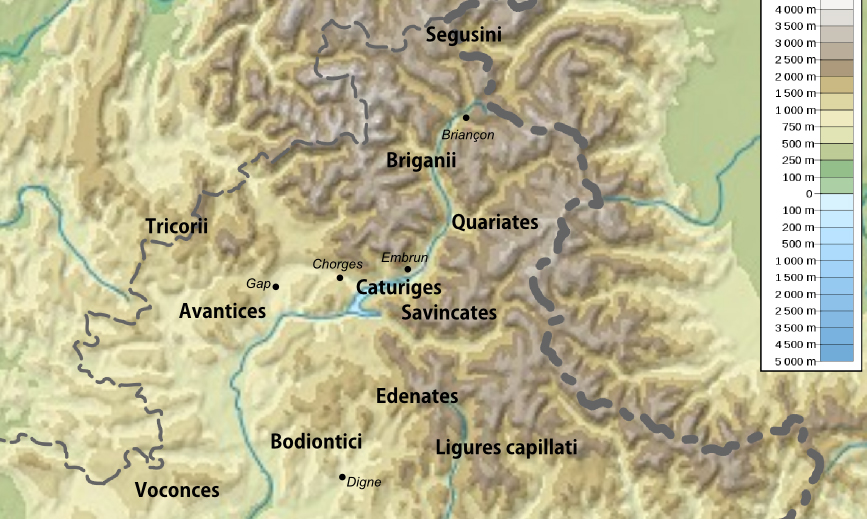
Ancient tribes in the southern Alps

Their territory was located in the valley of the Drac river, along the Montgenèvre route, on the south-western fringe of the Alpine massif (the western part of the present-day Hautes-Alpes department). The Barrington Atlas locates their territory south of the Allobroges and Ucennii, east of the Segovellauni, west of the Brigianii and Caturiges, and north of the Avantici. According to Guy Barruol, the Tricorii were not part of any confederation or clients of a larger tribe before the Roman conquest.

The exact boundaries of their territory depends on interpretations of Livy's itinerary, particularly the phrase per extremam oram Vocontiorum agri, which has been translated either as skirting the Vocontii frontier or crossing their territory, leading to varying reconstructions that place the Tricorii in an area restricted to the Trièves region, or extending into the Buëch or the Durance valley. The association with the name Trièves based on homophony is debated, since it is attested as Tarao in the 7th century AD (Triviae in the Middle Age).

During the Roman period, none of their settlements was elevated to the status of a civitas. Their absence from the Tropaeum Alpium indicates that they were not among the Alpine peoples conquered by Augustus in 16–7 BC, that they were either subdued earlier or already assimilated into a larger group at that time, which may explain why they did not form a civitas under the Roman Empire. Some scholars have proposed that the Tricorii were integrated into the Vocontii in the 1st century BC, a view supported by the later inclusion of Trièves in the medieval diocese of Die.

In Late Antiquity, the region was dismantled and redistributed among neighbouring administrative districts: the upper Drac valley (Champsaur and Dévoluy) was attached to the diocese of Gap (civitas Vapincensium) in Narbonensis Secunda; the Ebron valley (Trièves) to the bishopric of Die (civitas Deensium) in Viennensis; and the right bank of the middle Drac valley together with the lower valley to the diocese of Grenoble (civitas Gratianopolitana), also in Viennensis.

== History ==
=== Hannibal's crossing of the Alps ===
In 218 BC, Hannibal marched through their territory during the crossing of the Alps. According to Dexter Hoyos's interpretation of the sources, Hannibal's initial progress through their territory was facilitated by Tricorii's assistance, as they provided guides, livestock for provisions, and hostages, allowing the army to march peacefully for several days. On the fourth day, however, the Tricorii attacked the Carthaginian forces in a narrow gorge, temporarily separating Hannibal from his cavalry and pack animals. Despite this setback, the Carthaginian army regrouped beyond the ravine and continued its advance, though the following days were marked by further harassment before Hannibal ultimately reached the Alpine pass.

After settling the Allobrogian disputes Hannibal now headed for the Alps, but instead of taking the direct route he veered to the left into the lands of the Tricastini. He then advanced through the border territory of the Vocontii into the territory of the Trigorii, meeting no obstacle anywhere on his route until he reached the River Druentia. Also an Alpine river, this is, of all the waterways of Gaul, by far the most difficult to cross.

— Livy, History of Rome, 21.31.9, transl. Loeb

But Hannibal learned of this from deserters, and being of a nimble and crafty wit, came, under the guidance of natives from among the Taurini, through the Tricasini and the extreme edge of the Vocontii to the passes of the Tricorii. Starting out from there, he made another road, where it hitherto had been impassable; he hewed out a cliff which rose to a vast height by burning it with flames of immense power and crumbling it by pouring on vinegar; then he marched along the river Druentia, dangerous with its shifting eddies, and seized upon the district of Etruria.

— Ammianus Marcellinus, History, 15.10.11, transl. Loeb

=== Gallic Wars ===
In 58 BC, during the opening phase of the Gallic Wars, the Tricorii joined the march of the Helvetii, who attempted to cross southern Gaul in search of new settlement lands, bringing them into conflict with Roman forces under Julius Caesar.

Caesar opened his campaigns with a victory over some two hundred thousand of the Helvetii and Tigurini. At an earlier date the Tigurini had captured an army of Piso and Cassius, and had made them walk under the yoke, as Paulus Claudius believes in his annals. Caesar's legate, Labienus, defeated these Tigurini, while Caesar himself defeated the others, who were assisted by the Tricorii, and then the Germans under Ariovistus.

— Appian, The Celtic Book, 4.I.3, transl. Loeb
