= Arch of Augustus (Susa) =

Ancient Roman arch constructed in the city of Susa, Piedmont, Italy

Coordinates: 45°8′9.8″N 7°2′34.6″E

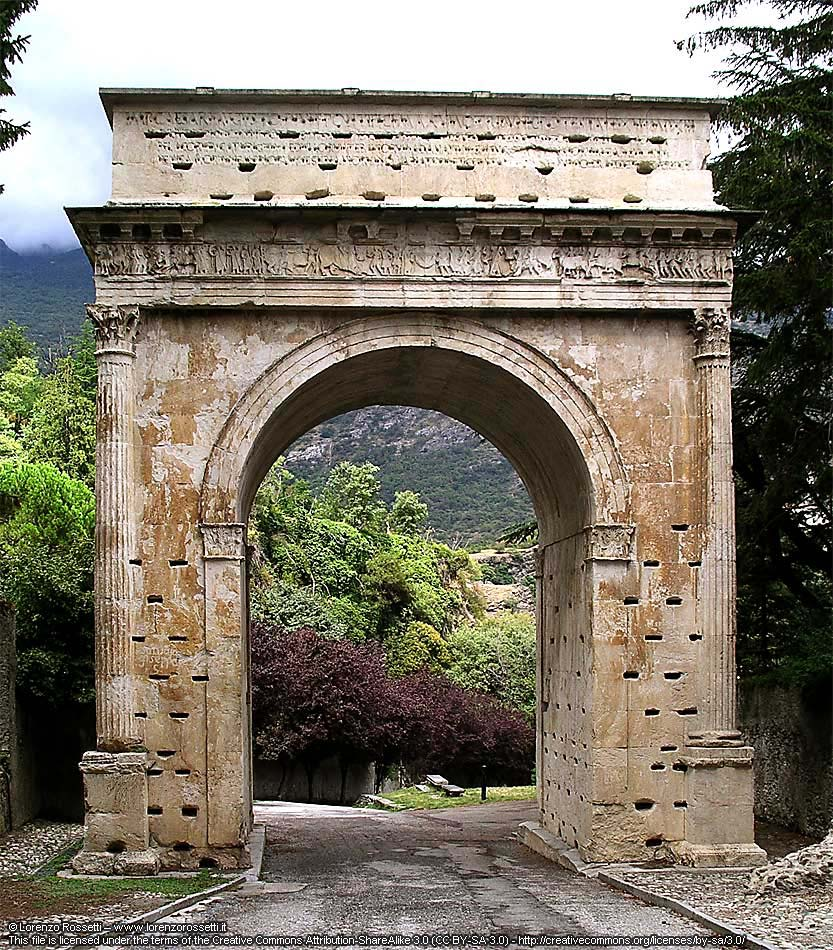
The Arch of Augustus facing south

The Arch of Augustus is an Ancient Roman arch constructed in the city of Susa, Piedmont, in the province of Turin. It was built in 9–8 BC to record the renewed alliance between Emperor Augustus and Marcus Julius Cottius, a Celto-Ligurian ruler who had been made king and Roman prefect of the Cottian Alps. The arch, together with other remains from the period, such as the Roman amphitheatre and a Roman aqueduct, underscore the importance that the city of Susa had during the Roman period.

== Description ==
From above, the arch forms a rectangle 11.93 metres long and 7.3 metres wide. It rests on two large bases and there is only one archway. The white marble of the arch was sourced from a nearby quarries at Foresto and Tre Piloni.

The arch has a unique arcade, in which the archivolt is supported by pilasters. The entablature rests on four Corinthian columns placed at the extremities of each corner, such that a quarter of each drum is embedded in the monument.

The lowest architrave is composed of three bands of which the lowest band is thicker than the middle band, and this in turn is thicker than the top band. Above the architrave, a frieze composed of a bass relief stretches around all four sides. Above that is the cornice which has twenty-two corbels on each face and twelve on each side of the arch. The corbels' panels are decorated with roses. On top of that rests the attic, which displays an inscription on both faces, likely originally set with bronze letters. They are both inscribed similarly except for the inclusion of an extra P on the inscription facing north, likely for the honorific title of Pater Patriae. Since Augustus was not given this title until 2 BC, it was likely a later addition.

The inscription reads:

IMP⸱CAESARI⸱AVGVSTO⸱DIVI⸱F⸱PONTIFICI⸱MAXVMO⸱TRIBVNIC⸱POTESTATE⸱XV⸱IMP⸱XIII (P)
M⸱IVLIVS⸱REGIS⸱DONNI⸱F⸱COTTIVS⸱PRAEFECTVS⸱CEIVITATIVM⸱QVAE⸱SVBSCRIPTAE⸱SVNT⸱SEGOVIORVM⸱SEGVSINORVM
BELACORVM⸱CATVRIGVM⸱MEDVLLORVM⸱TEBAVIORVM⸱ADANATIVM⸱SAVINCATIVM⸱ECDINIORVM
VEAMINIORVM⸱VENISAMORVM⸱IEMERIORUM⸱VESVBIANIORVM⸱QVADIATIVM⸱ET⸱CEIVITATES⸱QVAE⸱SVB⸱EO⸱PRAEFECTO⸱FVERVNT

To Imperator Caesar Augustus, son of a god, pontifex maximus, awarded tribunician power 15 times, acclaimed Imperator 13 times, (Pater (Patriae))
Marcus Julius Cottius, son of King Donnus, prefect of the following communities: the Segovii, Segusini,
Belaci, Caturiges, Medulli, Tebavii, Adanates, Savincates, Ecdinii,
Veaminii, Venisamores, Iemerii, Vesubianii, and Quadiates, and the (aforementioned) communities who were under this prefect (dedicated this arch)

The friezes represents the sacrifice of the suovetaurilia, a sacrifice in which the victims were a pig (sus), a sheep (ovis) and a bull (taurus) with the animals intended for sacrifice of exceptional size, clearly much larger than the men leading them to sacrifice. The scene has a great number of symbolic meanings, however it indicates above all that the sacrifice is the focus. The man performing the sacrifice is perhaps to be identified with Cottius. On the western side some representatives of the Cottian communities mentioned in the inscription are depicted. On the southern side a second sacrifice, officiated by Cottius, is depicted. On the eastern side the scene has been completely destroyed, with only two people walking discernable in the northern corner. Due to this, any interpretations are not possible.

== See also ==
- List of Roman triumphal arches

== Bibliography ==
- Michele Ruggiero, Storia della Valle di Susa - Alzani
- Bartolomasi Natalino, Valsusa Antica - Alzani
