= Ceutrones (Alps) =

Gallic tribe

The Ceutrones (or Centrones) were a Gallic tribe dwelling in the Tarantaise Valley, in modern Savoie, during the Iron Age and Roman period.

== Name ==
They are mentioned as Ceutrones by Caesar (mid-1st c. BC), Keútrōnes (Κεύτρωνες; var. Κέντ-) by Strabo (early 1st c. AD), Ceutrones by Pliny (1st c. AD), and as Keutrónōn (Κευτρόνων) by Ptolemy (2nd c. AD).

The hamlet of Centron, located in the village of Montgirod, may be named after the Gallic tribe.

They had a homonym tribe in Gallia Belgica, documented in 54 BC, which was probably a pagus of the Nervii.

== Geography ==
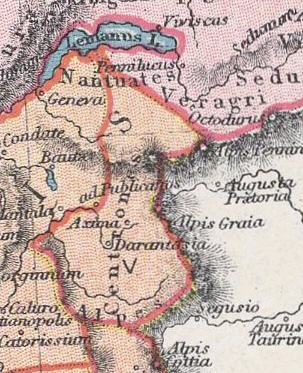
Map of Provincia Galliae Alpes Graiae et Poeninae occupied by the Ceutrones in about the 1st century AD Note: Lake Geneva is shown at the top

The Ceutrones dwelled in the Tarantaise Valley, along the upper Isère river, near the Little St Bernard Pass (Alpis Graia) on the route stretching from the Rhône Valley to the north of the Italian Peninsula. The Barrington Atlas locates their territory north of the Graioceli and Medulli, southeast of the Allobroges, southwest of the Veragri, and west of the Salassi, on the other side of the Alps.

Among the passes which lead over from Italy to the outer—or northerly—Celtica, is the one that leads through the country of the Salassi, to Lugdunum; it is a double pass, one branch, that through the Ceutrones, being practicable for wagons through the greater part of its length, while the other, that through the Poeninus, is steep and narrow, but a short cut.

— Strabo 1923, Geōgraphiká, 4:11.

Their chief town was known as Axima (modern Aime-la-Plagne). Renamed to Forum Claudii Ceutronum under Claudius (41–54 AD), probably when the Ceutrones were granted Latin Rights, it became the chief town of Alpes Graiae, one of the two divisions of the province of Alpes Graiae et Poeninae. The procurator of the province had an occasional residence in the Ceutronian chief town. In Late Antiquity, the city lost its position to Darentasia (Moûtiers), which became the capital of the Diocese of Tarentaise in 426.

== History ==
In the mid-1st century BC, the Ceutrones are mentioned by Julius Caesar as a tribe hostile to Rome. In what appears to be a concerted attack, they attempted to prevent his passage through the upper Durance along with the Caturiges and Graioceli in 58 BC.

There [Caesar] enrolled two legions, and brought out of winter quarters three that were wintering about Aquileia; and with these five legions made speed to march by the shortest route to Further Gaul, over the Alps. In that region the Ceutrones, the Graioceli, and the Caturiges, seizing points on the higher ground, essayed to stop the march of his army. They were repulsed in several actions; and on the seventh day he moved from Ocelum, the last station of Hither Gaul, into the borders of the Vocontii in Further Gaul.

— Caesar 1917, Commentarii de Bello Gallico, 1:10:4.

== Culture ==
The Ceutrones were possibly of Celto-Ligurian origin.

== Economy ==
The Ceutrones were known for copper mining. They also produced a renowned cheese named vatusicus.

== See also ==
- Allobroges
- Graioceli
- Medulli
- Ancient Diocese of Tarentaise
