= Sabates =

Sabates or Sabatés is a surname. Notable people with the surname include:

- Felix Sabates (born 1945), Cuban-born, US-based entrepreneur and philanthropist
- Jordi Sabatés (born 1948), Spanish pianist, composer and arranger
- Sandra Sabatés (born 1979), Spanish journalist and television presenter
