= Iemerii =

Celto-Ligurian tribe

The Iemerii (Gaulish: *Iemerioi, 'the twins') were a Celto-Ligurian tribe dwelling in the Val Chisone (Cottian Alps) during the Iron Age.

== Name ==
They are mentioned as Iemeriorum on an inscription.

The ethnic name Iemerii is a Latinized form of *Iemerioi, which can be compared with the Gaulish noun iemurioi, meaning 'twins'.

== Geography ==
The Iemerii lived in the Val Chisone, in the Cottian Alps. The Barrington Atlas locates their territory north of the Maielli, west of the Taurini.

== History ==
They appear on the Arch of Susa, erected by Cottius in 9–8 BC.
