= Taurini =

Celto-Ligurian tribe

Peoples of Cisalpine Gaul 391-192 BC.

The Taurini were a Ligurian or Celto-Ligurian tribe dwelling in the upper valley of the river Po, around present-day Turin, during the Iron Age and the Roman period.

== Name ==
They are mentioned as Taurĩnoí (Ταυρῖνοί) by Polybius (2nd c. BC), Taurini by Livy (late 1st c. BC), Taurinoí (Ταυρινοί) by Strabo (early 1st c. AD), Taurinorum by Pliny (1st c. AD), and as Taurínōn (Ταυρίνων; var. Ταυρικῶν, Ταυρινῶν) by Ptolemy (2nd c. AD).

The ethnic name Taurini can be translated as 'the tribe of the bull'. It can either derive from an archaic form of the metathesized Celtic noun taruos ('bull'), or a non-Celtic Ligurian form.

== Geography ==
The Taurini lived between the Dora Riparia and the upper Po river. The Barrington Atlas locates their territory east of the Iemerii, west of the Libicii and Iadatini.

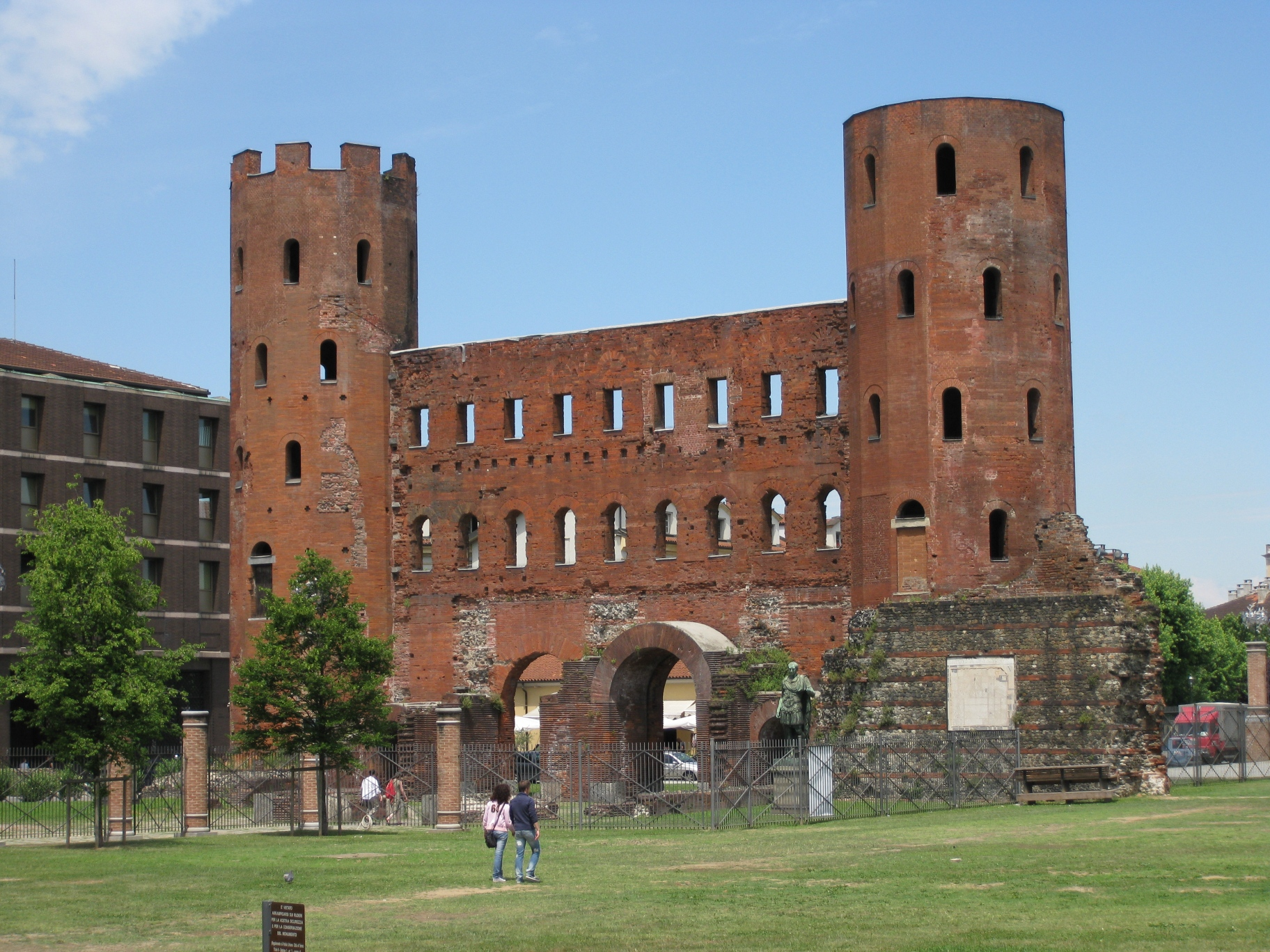
Porta Palatina in Augusta Taurinorum (Turin).

Their original capital, Taurasia, was destroyed by the Carthaginians after they opposed in vain Hannibal's march into Italy in 218 BC. It was refounded by the Romans after 25 BC as Colonia Augusta Taurinorum (modern Turin), at the confluence of the Dora and Po. The settlement was hit by a fire in 69 AD.

== History ==
They were involved in Rome's wars against the Celts at the end of the 4th century BC.

In 218 BC, they were attacked by Hannibal, who had allied with their long-standing enemies, the Insubres. Their chief town was captured by Hannibal's forces after a three-day siege.

== Culture ==
The ethnic identity of the Taurini is unclear. They have been variously described as Celts, Ligurians, or more likely, Celticized Ligurians.

== See also ==
- List of ancient peoples of Italy
