= Tigulli =

Ligurian tribe

The Tigulli were a Ligurian tribe living in the modern Tigullio region of Italy during the Iron Age and the Roman period.

== Name ==
They are mentioned as Tigullia by Pliny (1st c. AD), Tigulia by Pomponius Mela (1st c. AD), Tigoullía by Ptolemy (2nd c. AD), and in corrupted variants such as Tegulata (Antonine Itinerary) and Tigtila (Tabula Peutingeriana). The designation also appears in the toponym Segesta Tigulliorum (modern Sestri Levante) mentioned by Pliny.

The ethnic name Tigullii can be translated as 'the inhabitants of Tigulia' (Segesta Tigulliorum, modern Sestri Levante). The suffix -ullo-, here combined with a secondary -io-, is frequent in Celtic, as in the name of the Medulli of the western Alps. Its meaning is debated. Patrizia de Bernardo Stempel has proposed to interpret the toponym Tigulia as meaning 'the last town [of the gulf]'. Giulia Petracco Sicardi connects instead the base *tig(u)- with the Helvetic ethnonym Tigurini and with the Celtic epithet tigirno- ('lord').

== Geography ==
The Tigulli lived around Segesta Tigulliorum (modern Sestri Levante), in the Tigullio region between Genua (modern Genoa) and Luna (modern Luni).

Ancient sources mention two neighbouring settlements east of Genua: Tigullia, cited by Pliny, Pomponius Mela and Ptolemy, and Segesta Tigulliorum, also recorded by Pliny. Their precise relationship is difficult to determine. One hypothesis sees Segesta as a coastal settlement with a landing place (positio), and Tigullia as an inland site along the road axis, functioning as a mansio or a market. Some authors have treated Segesta Tigulliorum and Tigullia as a single centre, placing the inland nucleus at the site of the parish church of Santo Stefano.

The name Segesta possibly derives from the Indo-European root *segh- ('to be firm'), implying a strong or fortified place. This may reflect original nature of the vicus-type settlement of the Romanised site.

== History ==
Knowledge of the Tigulli is largely derived from the Chiavari necropolis, an Iron Age Ligurian burial ground connected to wider commercial networks and used from the 7th century BC by a tribal group settled in the Rupinaro basin.

Further evidence comes from an inscription from Sala Colonia (modern Chellah, Morocco), dated to around AD 140, which identifies Lucius Minicius Pulcher, a cavalry commander, as originating domo Tigullis ex Liguria. Although Minicius' enrolment in the Galeria tribus seems to imply a connection with Genua, it also included citizens from several other centres, such as Luna and Veleia, making the administrative status of Tigullis uncertain.
