= Tebavii =

Gallic tribe

The Tebavii were a Gallic tribe dwelling in the Alps during the Iron Age.

== Name ==
They are mentioned as Tebaviorum on the Arch of Susa.

The suffix -auii (sing. -auios), which could mean 'desire, envy', is found in other Gaulish tribal names, such as Carnavii and Vellavii.

== Geography ==
The Tebavii may have dwelled in the Ubaye valley, although their exact location remains uncertain.

== History ==
They are mentioned on the Arch of Susa, erected by Cottius in 9–8 BC.
