= Saldaş =

- Location within Azerbaijan
- Coordinates: 39°15′04″N 46°35′03″E
- Country: Azerbaijan
- Rayon: Qubadli
- Time zone: UTC+4 (AZT)
  - Summer (DST): UTC+5 (AZT)

Saldaş (also, Soldaş and Saldash) is a village in the Qubadli Rayon of Azerbaijan.
