= Quariates =

Gallic tribe

The Quariates or Quadiates were a Gallic tribe dwelling in the valley of Queyras, in the Alps, during the Iron Age.

== Name ==
They are mentioned as Quariates (var. quadr-) by Pliny (1st c. AD), and as Quadiatium and Quariat(ium?) on inscriptions.

The etymology of the name is obscure. Christian-Joseph Guyonvarc'h and Xavier Delamarre proposed to derive it from Celtic *k^{w}ario- ('cauldron'), with sporadic preservation of the initial k^{w}, attached to the suffix -ati- ('belonging to'). Alexander Falileyev notes that the q-Celtic reflex remains problematic in this scenario.

The region of Queyras, whose castle is attested as Quadratum in the 12th century, may be named after the Gallic tribe.

== Geography ==
The Quariates dwelled in the valley of Queyras, in the Alps. The Barrington Atlas locates their territory south of the Brigianii, east of the Segovii, and north of the Caturiges and Veneni.

== History ==
They appear on the Arch of Susa, erected by Cottius in 9–8 BC.
