= Ermes Paterlini =

Italian footballer (born 1947)

Ermes Paterlini (born 18 March 1947, in Sestri Levante) is an Italian retired footballer. He played as a goalkeeper. He played for Sestri Levante youth teams and was bought by Sampdoria in 1967. At the time Sampdoria played in Serie A and he was the third goalkeeper behind Piero Battara and Enzo Matteucci. He played his first and only match in Serie A on the Easter of 1968. After three years at Sampdoria he went to Taranto and Mantova, where he never played, and then continued his career in lower series

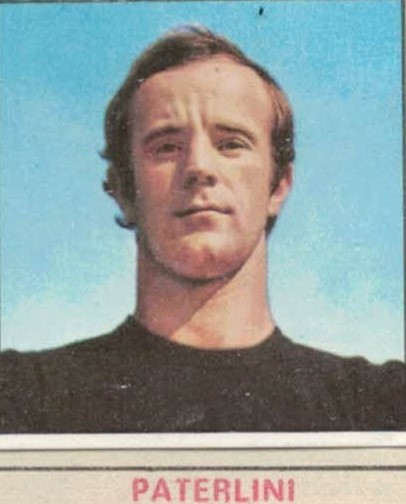
Ermes Paterlini in 1970

Height: 1,86m

Nationality: Italy

Position: Goalkeeper

Current club: Retired

== Career ==
- 1967-68 Sampdoria A 1 0
- 1968-69 Sampdoria A 0 0
- 1969-70 Sampdoria A 0 0
- 1970-71 Taranto B 0 0
- 1971-72 Mantova A 0 0
- 1972-73 Savona C 32 0
- 1973-74 Savona C 38 0
- 1974-75 Chieti C 31 0
- 1975-76 Treviso C 3 0
- 1976-77 Sestri Levante D
- 1977-78 Sestri Levante D
- 1978-79 Sestri Levante D
- 1979-80 Sammargheritese Prom.
- 1980-81 Sammargheritese Prom.
- 1981-82 Entella Int.
- 1982-83 Riva Trigoso Prom.
- 1983-84 Riva Trigoso Prom.
- 1986-87 Sestri Levante Prom.
