= Brigianii =

Gallic tribe

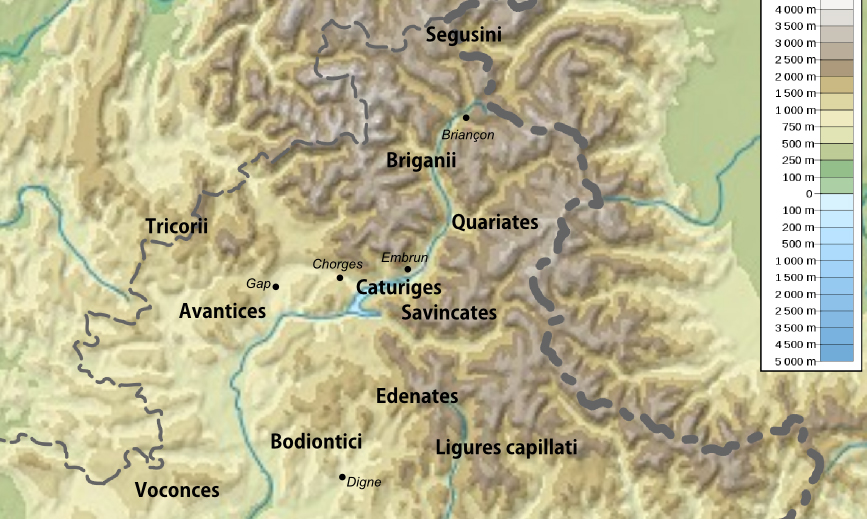

The Brigianii (Gaulish: *Brigianioi) were a Gallic tribe dwelling around present-day Briançon during the Iron Age and the Roman period.

== Name ==
They are mentioned as Brigianii by Pliny (1st c. AD), and as Brigiani, Brigantionis and Bricianiorum on inscriptions.

Their name may be based on the Gaulish root brig- ('high, elevated'), or on brīgo- ('might, strength').

== Geography ==
The Gallitae lived in the region of Briançonnais, in the center of the Cottian Kingdom. The Barrington Atlas locates their territory north of the Caturiges, west of the Quariates, east of the Tricorii, south of the Segovii.

Their chief town was known as Brigantio (modern Briançon), meaning 'eminence, high/elevated place' in Gaulish.

== History ==
They are mentioned by Pliny the Elder as one of the Alpine tribes conquered by Rome in 16–15 BC, and whose name was engraved on the Tropaeum Alpium.
