= Laevi =

Ancient Ligurian people of northern Italy

The Laevi were a Celto-Ligurian people of Gallia Transpadana, in northern Italy, settled near the river Ticino. According to the literary tradition they founded, together with the neighbouring Marici, the town of Ticinum (modern Pavia).

== Name ==
The Laevi are mentioned as Láoi (Λάοι) by Polybius (2nd c. BC), and as Laevi by Livy (late 1st c. BC) and Pliny (1st c. AD).

According to Giulia Petracco Sicardi, the name is formed from the same base *Laiuo- that underlies the place-names Laeveli and Laevia of the Veleia alimentary tablet, a base she connects with an Indo-European root *lēu- ('stone').

== Ethnic identity ==
Ancient authors disagree on the people's affiliation. Livy and Pliny treat the Laevi as Ligurians, whereas Polybius counts them among the Gauls, a divergence reflected also in the modern label "Celto-Ligurian".

== Geography ==
The Laevi held a district of Transpadane Italy around the lower Ticino, and a centre has been proposed near present-day Gropello Cairoli, in the Lomellina. Their position relative to the Marici is uncertain. Arslan places the Laevi north of the Po, with the Marici on the opposite bank, and observes that the real arrangement may have been more complex. In another passage he infers, from the need for the Gauls to cross Laevi land in order to reach and ravage the Libui, that the Laevi lay south of the Marici.

The Laevi and Marici occupied a central place in a network of road and river communications, a position that kept its strategic value for the control of central Transpadana over many centuries, above all with the growth of Ticinum in Roman and early medieval times.

== History ==
According to the literary tradition the Laevi were an old Ligurian people settled along the Ticino, and together with the neighbouring Marici they founded Ticinum (modern Pavia). For the 6th and 5th centuries BC it is unclear whether the Laevi formed a distinct people or were united with the Marici, the Marici being treated in the scholarship as a Laténised group and the Laevi as Ligurians. Arslan has proposed that the two occupied separate territories in this period, the Laevi, north of the Po, undergoing a partial Laténisation through their links with the Marici across the river.

In the wars between Rome and the Cisalpine Gauls in the early 2nd century BC, the Laevi and the Libui remained allies of Rome, and for that reason their territory was ravaged by the Boii.
