= Medulli =

The Gaulish name Medulli can refer to:

- Medulli (Aquitania), an ancient Gallic tribe dwelling in the Médoc region
- Medulli (Narbonensis), an ancient Gallic tribe dwelling in upper valley of Maurienne
