= Barrington Atlas of the Greek and Roman World =

Large-format English language atlas

Barrington Atlas of the Greek and Roman World

The Barrington Atlas of the Greek and Roman World is a large-format English language atlas of ancient Europe, Asia, and North Africa, edited by Richard J. A. Talbert. The time period depicted is roughly from archaic Greek civilization (pre-550 BC) through Late Antiquity (640 AD). The atlas was published by Princeton University Press in 2000. The book was the winner of the 2000 Association of American Publishers Award for Best Professional/Scholarly Multivolume Reference Work in the Humanities.

== Overview ==
The main (atlas) volume contains 102 color topographic maps, covering territory from the British Isles and the Azores and eastward to Afghanistan and western China. The size of the volume is 33 x 48 cm. A 45-page gazetteer is also included in the atlas volume. The atlas is accompanied by a map-by-map directory on CD-ROM, in PDF format, including a search index. The map-by-map directory is also available in print as a two-volume, 1,500 page edition.

According to the editor, the purpose of each map is to offer an up-to-date presentation of the important physical and covered features of the area, using all available literal, epigraphic, and archaeological data.

Most of the maps are of the scale 1:1,000,000 or 1:500,000. However, the environs of the three greater centers (Athens, Rome, Byzantium-Constantinople) are presented in 1:150,000. Some remote regions, where Greeks and Romans mostly explored and traded rather than settled (i.e. Baltic, Arabia, East Africa, India, Sri Lanka), are of the scale 1:5,000,000. Due to the nature of the base maps used for the background and time–cost restrictions, elevation lines (contours) were left in feet except for the 1:150,000 maps where they are in meters. The projection of the maps is Lambert Conformal Conic. Again due to time and cost restrictions, geo-referencing of the maps was left as a future separate project.

Effort was spent to show the physical landscape in its ancient rather than modern aspect. As expected, this task often met insurmountable difficulties, due to the lack of data. In those cases, at least an effort was made to eliminate known modern features and to restore the affected landscapes.

The atlas' production began in 1988 at the University of North Carolina, Chapel Hill, and involved a team of 221 classicists and 22 map makers. The effort was funded by $4.5 million—"an unusually large sum for a project in the humanities"—in federal and private donations. The largest individual contributor was Robert B. Strassler's family philanthropy The Barrington Foundation which supported the project with over $1 million and for which, in accordance with the donor's wishes, the atlas is named. (The foundation, in turn, is named after the Strassler family's place of residence, Great Barrington, Massachusetts.)

The atlas provides an up-to-date reference for ancient geography, superseding William Smith's An Atlas of Ancient Geography, Biblical and Classical (London: John Murray, 1872–1874), the last successfully completed attempt to comprehensively map the Greco-Roman world and reflect the state of scholarship.

An ongoing wiki-like on-line large scale collaboration for maintaining and diversifying the Barrington Atlas data-set is carried on by the Pleiades Project.

== Period coverage ==
The time period covered is roughly from 1000 BC up to c. AD 640, categorized as following:

- Archaic period (pre-550 BC)
- Classical period (550–330 BC)
- Hellenistic period / Middle to Late Republican period at Rome (330 BC–30 BC)
- Early Roman Empire (30 BC–AD 300)
- Late Antiquity (300–640)

All eras are covered in every map (i.e. there are not separate maps for different periods of the same region).

== Naming conventions ==
The Latin titles given to the regional categories and to the individual maps (see below) are no more than generalized identifications. E.g. Internum Mare (literally, "Internal Sea") is the region around Mediterranean Sea.

Inside maps, ancient names are underlined with specific colors, when they are applicable only to a specific era. Where modern names are used, they are printed in different (sans-serif) font. For the physical features, standard Latin descriptive terms are usually used (e.g. Lacus for Lake, Mons for Mountain). Explanations for these terms are given in the Map Key. When there is doubt whether the name correctly applies to a feature or area, it is followed by a question mark. When only the approximate location is known, the name is italicized.

== Atlas volume contents ==
- Contributors, Reviewers, Cartographers
- Preface, Introduction, Guidelines for Reference
- MapQuest Production Data, Map Bases
- Six small-scale overview maps at 1:5,000,000:
  - Map Key, Internum Mare (Mediterranean Sea)
  - Hibernia-Scandinavia
  - Asia Occidentalis (Southwest Asia)
  - Arabia-Azania
  - India
  - Asia Orientalis (Bactria, Sogdiana, Arachosia, Indus valley)
- Then 93 maps are divided into six regional categories :
  - Part 1: Europa Septentrionalis (Northern Europe)
  - Part 2: Hispania-Libya
  - Part 3: Italia
  - Part 4: Graecia-Asia Minor
  - Part 5: Syria-Meroe
  - Part 6: Pontus Euxinus-Persicus Sinus-Bactria
- Then the provinces of the Roman Empire are presented in three 1:10,000,000 maps:
  - Provinces at the death of Trajan (117)
  - Dioceses and provinces according to the Verona List (c. 303-324)
  - Dioceses and provinces according to Synecdemus of Hierocles (late 5th - early 6th century)
- Gazetteer

== Map-by-map directory contents ==
The two volumes (and the CD-ROM) contain:

- Guidelines
- Abbreviations
- A separate directory for each map whose main components are:
  - an introductory text
  - a listing of names and features (with period, modern name and literature reference information)
  - a bibliography

The CD-ROM also contains the gazetteer in PDF format and an installer of the version 4 of Adobe Acrobat Reader with Search for Microsoft Windows and Mac OS X. However, on Windows systems with the latest version of the Adobe Acrobat Reader already installed, installation of the version 4 might lead to incompatibility problems.

The supplied PDF index file BATLINDX.PDX is readable for Acrobat Reader versions up to and including version 9. For version X and later, using the "Use Advanced Search Options" item in the "Edit" menu may be a workaround. However, searching the complete index directory will take a while and with each new search the scanning of PDF files starts again from scratch. In general it will be faster to look for a name in the index. So, though the atlas claims to be "a reference work of permanent value", a simple Acrobat Reader update will cripple its usability even for users who have the printed version of the map-by-map directory available, because the index shows only the main entries for each object.

The map-by-map directory and the gazetteer are also available in PDF format at the Princeton University Press website. Until 2013, a free download of the CD-ROM as a ZIP file was offered as well.

== iPad version ==
In November 2013, PUP released an iPad 2+ App version of the Atlas which retailed at a 95% discount from the hardcover edition making it more accessible to the average reader. It contains the complete contents of the atlas and is searchable.

== Current editions ==
- Hardback (cloth) with CD-ROM Map-by-Map Directory, 2000, ISBN 0-691-03169-X
- Hardback (cloth) with CD-ROM & two-volume 1,500 page Map-by-Map Directory, 2000, ISBN 0-691-04962-9
- Hardback (cloth) two-volume Map-by-Map Directory, 2000, ISBN 0-691-04945-9
- Digital (iPad 2+ App), 2013
