= Ligurian language (ancient) =

Extinct Indo-European language

Ligurian
- Native to: Liguria
- Region: Northern Mediterranean Coast straddling South-east French and North-west Italian coasts.
- Era: attested c. 2nd century BCE – 1st century CE (Note: Almost exclusively known through personal and place names. Isolated glosses appear earlier (Herodotus, 5th century BCE), and five statue-stele inscriptions from Lunigiana (late 7th–6th century BCE) have been claimed for Ligurian, but their attribution is disputed.)
- Language family: Indo-European: possibly Celtic, Para-Celtic, or a distinct Indo-European branch; Ligurian

Language codes
- ISO 639-3: xlg
- Glottolog: anci1248

The Ligurian language was an ancient Indo-European language spoken by the Ligures, an indigenous people of north-western Italy and south-eastern France in pre-Roman and Roman times. No continuous text in the language survives: Ligurian is known almost entirely through place and river names, tribal and personal names, and a few glosses quoted by Greek and Latin authors. The single most important document is the Polcevera Tablet (117 BCE), a Roman arbitration preserving a series of indigenous place names in Latin transcription; a small group of pre-Roman inscriptions, notably five statue-stelae from Lunigiana, has also been claimed for the language, though their attribution remains disputed.

Because Ligurian is so sparsely attested, its classification and relationship to neighbouring languages has proven difficult, prompting debate among linguists for much of the 20th century. The current consensus among specialists holds that Ligurian was an Indo-European language or group of languages. Its precise position within Indo-European remains disputed. Some scholars classify it as a Celtic language retaining archaic features, while others treat it as a separate Indo-European language whose resemblances to Celtic reflect close contact or common Indo-European inheritance.

However, both positions remains partly speculative due to the scarcity of data. It is not even certain that the material represents a single language. The non-Celtic, non-Italic forms found across the areas that ancient sources called 'Ligurian', extending from the modern region of Liguria to the Rhône, and for the earliest Greek authors into north-eastern Spain, may have belonged to several distinct languages. In response, some scholars have proposed distinguishing a 'restricted Ligurian' area in the Roman regio IX Liguria from a linguistically heterogeneous 'broad Ligurian' area. A minority of scholars have questioned the existence of a Ligurian language or culture altogether.

The name has also carried a much wider sense. From the late 19th century to the mid-20th, 'Ligurian' served as a label for hypothetical prehistoric linguistic strata across Western Europe, whether a Pre-Indo-European Mediterranean substratum or an early Indo-European substratum. These pan-European theories are rejected by recent scholarship.

== Ethnographic context ==
=== Territory ===
Recreation of world map of Hecataeus of Miletus (6th century BC).

Early Greek geographers, such as Hecataeus of Miletus (6th century BCE) and the author of the Periplus of Pseudo-Scylax (4th century BCE), used the term Ligues (Ancient Greek: Λῐ́γῠες, romanized: Lĭ́gŭes) as a broad label for the so-called barbarians of the distant West. They placed these peoples in a semi-mythical setting at the outer edges of the known world, comparable to other legendary groups like the Hyperboreans or Aethiopians, who were believed to inhabit the world's extreme boundaries. In these sources, Ligustica (Λῐ́γῠστικά), the land of the Ligues, often aligned with Massalia's sphere of influence, stretching from Emporion in Catalunya in Iberia and parts of southwestern Gaul to Antipolis (Antibes) in southeastern France. Classical Greek authors of this period do not mention any Ligures (the Latinisation of the Greek term) in the Italian Peninsula. Instead, they describe Ligurian territory as ending east around Antipolis or Monoikos (Monaco), beyond which began the domains of the Tyrrhenians (Etruscan civilisation) or Pelasgians.

Over time, as geographic knowledge improved and distinct groups like the Iberians and Gauls came into clearer focus, references to the Ligures became more concrete. Later Latin authors continued to echo elements of the older, semi-mythical tradition, yet the idea of Ligures as a general label for the distant West gradually gave way to a more localised concept, placing them in a specific region around Massalia (Marseille).

... though the early writers of the Greeks call the Sallyes 'Ligues', and the country which the Massiliotes hold, 'Ligustica', later writers name them 'Celtoligues', and attach to their territory all the level country as far as Luerio and the Rhodanus, the country from which the inhabitants, divided into ten parts, used to send forth an army, not only of infantry, but of cavalry as well.

— Strabo 1923, Geōgraphiká, 4:6:3.

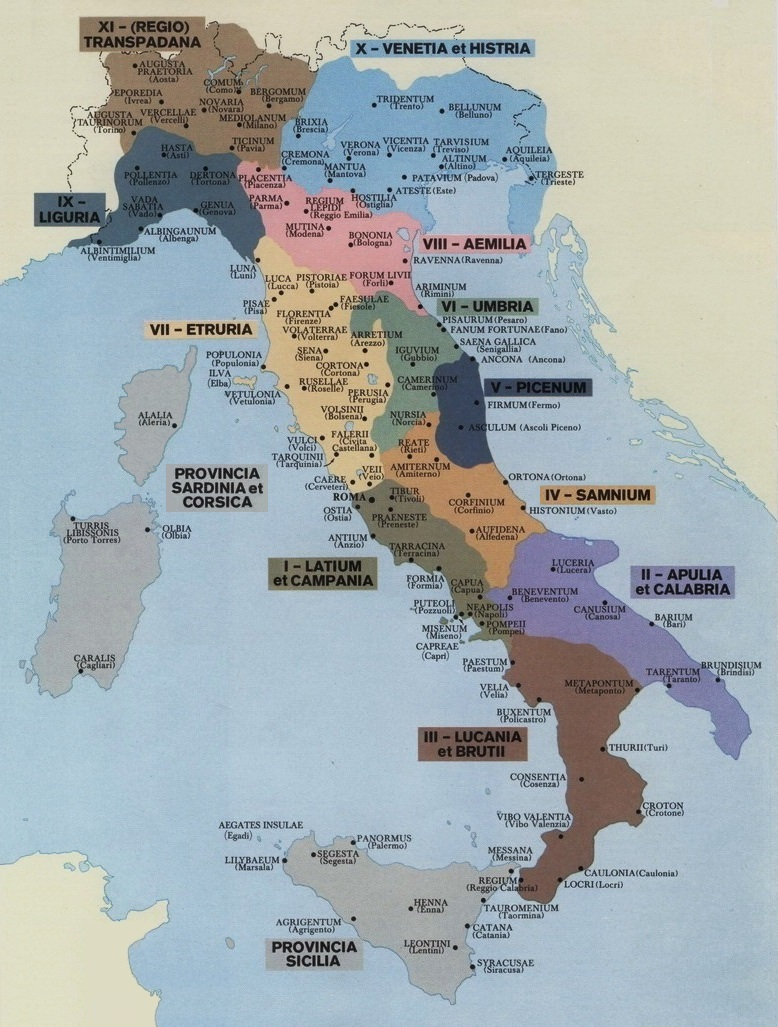
The Roman regio Liguria at the time of Augustus (7 CE), at the top left of the map.

By the 3rd century BCE, Roman records (the Acta triumphalia Populi Romani of Publius Cornelius Lentulus Caudinus) began mentioning Ligures in Italy north of the Magra. This suggests that the Romans recognised a distinct people called 'Ligures' in the Italian Peninsula, separate from the older Greek tradition of 'Ligues' in southern Gaul. In the subsequent centuries, Roman military campaigns in the region (including one against the Ingauni in 185–180 BCE) gradually brought to light the existence of Ligures in northwestern Italy, culminating in the formal establishment of the Region IX Liguria under Augustus (27 BCE – 14 CE). At that point, the Ligures occupied the westernmost part of what is now the Italian and French Rivieras (the continental western Mediterranean coast), extending from Album Intimilium (now Ventimiglia) to Amelia (Ameglia). The Italian Riviera is within the current region named Liguria

=== Ethnicity ===
The Ligures are possibly first mentioned by Hesiod, and evidently survived well into Roman times, giving roughly a millennium of non-linguistic evidence for their existence; the testimony of their language itself is, by contrast, meagre and often controversial. Early Greek authors such as Hecataeus of Miletus and Pseudo-Scylax probably used 'Ligure' as a generic name for such distant and partially known tribes, or merely as a geographic reference that had no relevance to their ethnicity. To reconcile conflicting accounts, certain ancient sources coined terms like 'Celto-Ligure' to suggest an ethnic intermingling. Latin historian Livy believed that the Ligures represented an older stratum predating the Gauls in northern Italy, while Strabo and others observed that many of the peoples previously described as 'Ligures' were actually Celts. In an attempt to resolve these inconsistencies, Strabo proposed that Celtic influence had effectively supplanted the original Ligures. The compound ethnonym Keltoligyes is in fact extremely rare in the ancient sources (Pseudo-Aristotle; Strabo) and belongs to a typically Hellenistic class of formations combining a contemporary ethnic with an older geographic or ethnic label, like Celtiberi, Celtoscythae or Gallograeci.

Writing in the early 1st century AD, Strabo noted that the Ligures living in the Alps were a people distinct from the Celts, even though they shared cultural similarities.

As for the Alps ... many tribes (éthnê) occupy these mountains, all Celtic (keltikà) except the Ligurians; but while these Ligurians belong to a different people (heteroethneis), still they are similar to the Celts in their modes of life (bíois)

— Strabo 1923, Geōgraphiká, 2.5.28.

Regarding the tribes around Massalia, earlier writers called the Salyes 'Ligure', while Strabo used the denomination 'Celto-Ligure'. According to scholars, this suggests that their culture gradually came under the influence of a Celtic-speaking elite, as evidenced by the Celtic name of their ruler (Toutomotulos) and town (Glanon), and the Celtic influence on their religion ('severed head' cult). Similarly, the Segobriges were identified as Ligures by the oldest texts about the foundation of Massalia, but their ethnonym is undoubtedly Celtic.

== Ligurian lexicon ==
No text written in Ligurian survives, and no inscription can be securely attributed to the language. Knowledge of Ligurian therefore rests on indirect evidence of three kinds: glosses quoted by Greek and Latin authors; tribal and personal names transmitted by ancient texts and Latin inscriptions; and the place and river names of the area regarded as Ligurian in antiquity.

=== Inscriptions ===
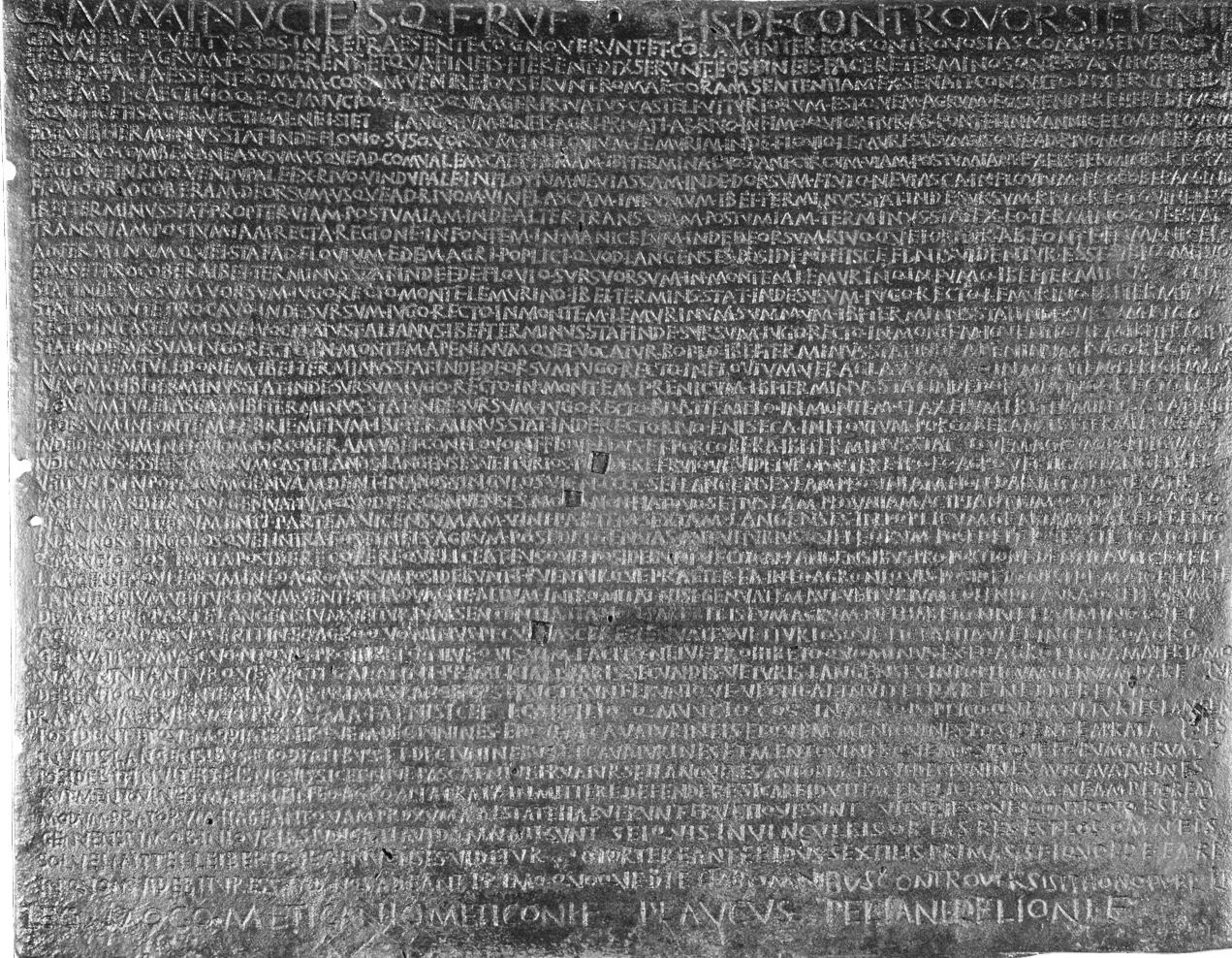
The Polcevera Tablet, dated to 117 BC and mentioning the dispute between the Viturii and Genuates, contains possible Ligurian toponyms.

The most important single document is the Polcevera Tablet, a bronze tablet of 117 BCE found in 1506 in the Polcevera valley near Genoa. Recording a Roman arbitration between the Genuates and the Viturii, it preserves in Latin transcription a series of indigenous place and river names, including the river Porcobera (the modern Polcevera), the streams Vinelasca, Neviasca, Tulelasca and Veraglasca, and the mountain name Tuledo. These forms are the core of the onomastic material conventionally labelled Ligurian. Other names from the tablet have received competing analyses. The mountain name Berigiema has been explained as a compound of PIE *bʰer- ('to carry') and *g̑ʰei̯em- ('snow'), or as a derivative of *bʰerg̑ʰ- ('hill'), while de Bernardo Stempel takes it as Celtic *Bérgiomā. The stream name Vindupalis has been read as '(river with) white pebbles', as 'winding river', and again as Celtic.

No inscription is unanimously attributed to Ligurian, but a small pre-Roman epigraphic dossier has been claimed for it. Five statue-stelae from Lunigiana carry short funerary inscriptions in an Etruscan-derived alphabet close to that of the Lugano tradition, dated to the end of the 7th or the mid-6th century BCE and thus contemporary with the earliest Lepontic texts. Their transcription and linguistic attribution are disputed: Michel Lejeune regarded them as Ligurian, Prosdocimi and de Bernardo Stempel as at least partly Celtic. Mees reads each text as a personal name followed by the father's name, built from the same elements as the Ligurian names of later Latin inscriptions, but with grammatical endings (-u for the bearer, a genitive in -s for the father) that do not match Celtic usage.

A few further pre-Roman short texts have been associated with Ligurian: some 32 brief, linguistically mixed inscriptions from Genoa, several preserving the onomastic element Blais-, and a bowl from Ameglia inscribed enistale, comparable to the Ligurian names Enistalus and Enistalius.

=== Glosses ===
Some glosses attributed to Ligurian also appear in the text of ancient writers. Glosses are the only layer of the Ligurian material in which the meaning of the words is also given. However, the interpretation of nearly all of them remains controversial, and some probably should not be labelled Ligurian at all.

Greek historian Herodotus, while discussing the name of the Sigynnae (Greek: Sigúnnai), a nomadic tribe from Central Europe, noted that the term sigynnae was also used by the Ligures living "up beyond Marseille" to refer to traders. The Ligurian name of the River Po, recorded by Polybius as Bodenkos and by Pliny as Bodincus, with the meaning 'bottomless' (fundo carens), has been compared to Sanskrit budhná- ('bottom, ground, base, depth'), Latin fundus and Middle Irish bond ('sole of the shoe').

Many of the other proposed Ligurian glosses remain uncertain. The term lebērís (λεβηρίς) is recorded by Strabo as a Massiliote word for 'rabbit'. Its attribution to Ligurian rests on the assumption that the Greek settlers borrowed it from the surrounding native population. It has been compared with Latin lepus ('hare'), which is possibly a loanword from the same western Mediterranean source. Pliny the Elder mentions langa or langurus as a type of lizard inhabiting the banks of the Po River, which Johannes Hubschmid linked to the Latin longus ('long'). Pliny reports that rye (secale) was called asia by the Taurini at the foot of the Alps. Since the ethnic classification of the Taurini was already uncertain in antiquity, the attribution of this gloss to Ligurian depends on identifying the Taurini as Ligures. The word has been tentatively emended to <s>asia and connected to the Sanskrit sasya- ('corn, grain, fruit, crop') and Welsh haidd ('barley'). The term saliúnka ('valerian'), recorded by Dioscorides, has been compared with Middle Irish sail and Latin salix ('willow'), though this connection also remain uncertain. Lepontic pala, meaning '(funerary) stone', has also sometimes been viewed as a borrowing from Ligurian.

=== Proper names ===
The suffix most often treated as diagnostically Ligurian is -asca/-asco, densely attested in place names of modern Liguria, Piedmont, the Ticino and Provence, including Neviasca, Vinelasca, Giubiasco, and Venasca. Its diagnostic value has, however, been sharply reduced by recent research. Giulia Petracco Sicardi observed that only 6 of the 225 ancient place and ethnic names of Liguria are formed with -asko-, and that the frequency of the suffix in the region is essentially medieval and Romance, so that the presence of later -asco names (such as Manoasca in Provence, recorded only in the 10th century AD) cannot by itself establish the 'Ligurian' character of a territory in ancient times. Its interpretation has itself been part of the classification problem: it is not otherwise found in wider European toponymy, but it is paralleled by the Armenian suffix -acʿi (< *-ask-) and appears to represent a remodelled form of the suffix *-isk̑- attested in Germanic and Tocharian.

Ligurian names are characterised by the frequent appearance of a suffix ‑anius. The trinomina Parra Enicius Miranius and Velacus Blaisicius Enici appear to contain Ligurian patronyms, and variant series (Blaesus, Blaesius, Blaisicius) shows how such names were derived. The element Blais-, found in names from both Liguria and Gallia Narbonensis, is already attested in pre-Roman Genoa on 5th-century BCE ceramics as plaiṣ[. Names in Blais- also occur in Sabine, Oscan, Etruscan and Latin inscriptions elsewhere in Italy, but their relationship to the Ligurian element is unclear.

Some bases seem to recur in Ligurian ethnonymy, such the suffixes -anto- (Epanterii, Vediantii), -turii (Viturii, Eguiturii, Esturi) and -elli (Binbelli, Statielli, Maielli). The suffix -ati, which is common in Ligurian ethnonyms (Odiates, Veleiates, Sabates, Casmonates, etc.), is also widespread in Celtic ethnic names, where it means 'belonging to'.

== Historiography ==
=== Substrate theories ===
From the late 19th century to the mid-20th century, 'Ligurian' served as a convenient label for prehistoric linguistic strata in Western Europe, in two competing senses: some scholars used it for a presumed pre-Indo-European Mediterranean substratum, while others applied it to an early Indo-European layer distinct from both Celtic and Italic.

In the late 19th century, Henri d'Arbois de Jubainville proposed that the Ligures constituted an early Indo-European substratum in Western Europe, separate from both Gaulish and Italic groups. Building on classical sources, he identified a range of place names and tribal names that did not fit neatly into known Celtic or Italic patterns. His theory, which came to be termed 'Celto-Ligurian', influenced philological and archaeological approaches for the following decades. In the words of Bernard Mees, de Jubainville became "the intellectual grandfather to a genealogy of prehistorical and protohistorical substratum theories".

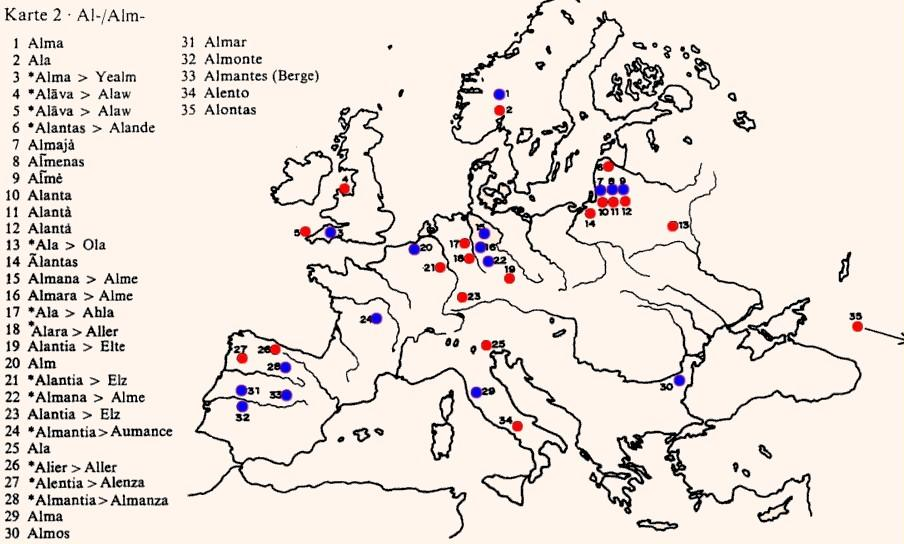
Hans Krahe's "Old European" hydronymic map for the root *al-, *alm-.

By the 1920s, scholars were using the "Celto-Ligurian" idea to explain problematic Indo-European toponyms and hydronyms across much of Europe. For instance, Paul Kretschmer argued that some inscriptions in Etruscan script (later identified as Lepontic Celtic) provided evidence for a Ligurian linguistic layer, but subsequent discoveries established these as clearly Celtic with only limited Etruscan influence. In the 1930s, Julius Pokorny adopted these insights for his pan-Illyrian (or 'llyro-Venetic') theory, linking it to the prehistoric Urnfield culture. Consequently, many difficult place-name etymologies were attributed to a hypothetical Illyrian layer, leading to broad, stratigraphical theories that traced Indo-European linguistic influences from Gaul all the way to the Balkans.

By the late 1950s, Pokorny's theories had lost their momentum following critical scrutiny. The underlying place-name elements championed by de Jubainville and Pokorny, however, were reworked by Hans Krahe into his 'Old European' theory. Focusing on hydronyms, Krahe advanced a more refined approach, yet it remained conceptually indebted to de Jubainville's earlier 'Celto-Ligurian' framework. Though Krahe proposed a more systematic argument than the earlier 'Illyrian' or 'Celto-Ligurian' frameworks, his theory still faced criticism for assuming that widespread, older Indo-European features belonged to one single language rather than several archaic dialects.

The rival interpretation of 'Ligurian' as a pre-Indo-European Mediterranean substratum persisted in parallel, with Mediterraneanist readings still being published in the 1950s. Krahe himself regarded genuine Ligurian as probably pre-Indo-European, overlaid by a later Indo-European superstrate. Traces of 'Ligurian' were formerly detected as far afield as Hispania, Sicily, Corsica, Normandy and southern Germania, on the basis of statements by ancient authors and alleged parallels in the toponymy of these areas.

Linguist James Clackson has criticised these approaches by stating that "the label 'Ligurian' merely serves to conceal our ignorance" about the pre-Roman linguistic landscape in various regions of Europe.

=== Regional Indo-European language ===
In 1900, Carl Pauli, building on d'Arbois de Jubainville's work, argued that the Ligures were Indo-Europeans. Kretschmer, publishing the Ornavasso inscriptions in 1905, concluded that Ligurian was an independent member of the Indo-European family and gave 'Celto-Ligurian' its lasting sense of Celticized Ligures. Joshua Whatmough held that the onomastic record documented an Indo-European language neither Italic nor Celtic but intermediate between the two. Vittore Pisani (1941) saw the historical Ligurian dialects as a non-Celtic, non-Italic Indo-European stratum superimposed on a pre-Indo-European ('anarian') layer, heavily influenced by Gaulish from the late 6th century BCE. Like Kretschmer, he still counted the Lepontic inscriptions as Ligurian. Their reattribution to Celtic came only with Prosdocimi's analysis of the Prestino inscription in 1967 and Lejeune's study in 1971. The scholars of this period recognised in Ligurian a predominant Indo-European component closely related to, yet distinct from, Celtic.

Once the Lepontic corpus had been correctly dated and identified as Celtic in the 1960–1970s, Ligurian could no longer be viewed as a transitional idiom between Celtic and Italic languages. By the early 21st century, specialists in the ancient languages of the region have come to the conclusion that Ligurian was an Indo-European language, but are still divided on how close it stood to Celtic and on its geographical extent.

=== Current debates ===
The central scholarly debate concerns the precise relationship between Ligurian and Celtic, since the former exhibits both convergences with and divergences from ancient Celtic varieties such as Gaulish and Lepontic.

Patrizia de Bernardo Stempel has proposed that Ligurian may represent an archaic Celtic dialect shaped by the influence of a non-Celtic substratum, which would account for its distinctive features. Xavier Delamarre likewise believes that the Ligurian language may derive from an early form of Celtic, viewing the Ligurians as groups involved in the first Celtic movements into southern Europe. Francesco Rubat Borel has also argued that Ligurian is best regarded as a Celtic dialect that preserved archaic traits and innovated locally. Conversely, Javier de Hoz, Jürgen Untermann, Alexander Falileyev and Bernard Mees contend that Ligurian was a separate Indo-European language or branch, possibly related to Celtic, influenced by it, or that the shared traits merely reflect inherited Indo-European features.

Scholarly debate extends also to the geographical extent of linguistic elements attributable to Ligurian. Javier de Hoz has proposed distinguishing between two zones: the territory of the 'Ligures' of the Roman regio Liguria (between Ventimiglia and Ameglia), and the broader area described in early sources as inhabited by the 'Ligues' (from the Arno River to west of the Rhône, and possibly into north-eastern Spain). He designates the former 'restricted Ligurian', noting that this group had a well-defined cultural identity and likely used an Indo-European language ('Ligurian' proper) about which little is directly known. The latter region, which he calls 'broad Ligurian', was possibly inhabited by culturally related but likely diverse peoples who may have spoken various languages. Falileyev adds that the territories neighbouring regio Liguria in Southeastern France could also been considered part of 'restricted Ligurian'.

== Classification ==
=== Phonology ===
The historical phonology of the Indo-European layer of Ligurian has been sketched by Joshua Whatmough, Giacomo Devoto, Michel Lejeune and, in most detail, Giulia Petracco Sicardi, whose scheme has been updated by Alexander Falileyev. On this reconstruction, Ligurian was a centum language; PIE *bʰ yielded b, with general deaspiration of the inherited aspirates (in contrast to Latin), while initial *p- and the sonorants were retained (in contrast to Celtic). Most inherited vowels were preserved, *o only sporadically; *u gave o in some positions, and unstressed *-i̯o- developed to -i̯e-. Compounding and a range of suffixes (-ink-, -isk-, -l-, -i̯o-, -ask-) are attested in word formation, though some of the suffixes may in fact be pre-Indo-European or of multiple origins. Falileyev stresses that the scheme remains tentative and that establishing the precise place of Indo-European Ligurian among the other branches is, on the present evidence, only speculative.

=== Similarities with Celtic ===
According to Patrizia de Bernardo Stempel and Xavier Delamarre, many tribal names described as Ligurian by ancient sources can be explained as Celtic. This includes the Ingauni (Celt. *Pingāmnī), Salyes (*Sḷwes), Ligauni (līg- or liga-), Intimilii (uindi-), Maricii (maro-), and Oxybii (oxso- or uxso-), as well as the Iemerii (iemur-), Orobii (orbi-), Segobrigii (sego-) and Reii (*riio-).

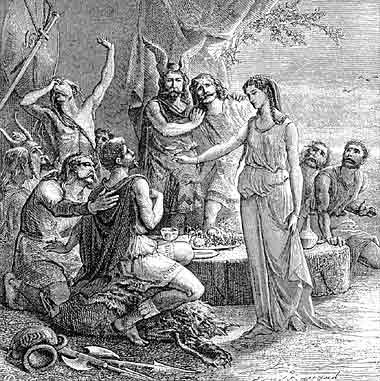
The Segobriges were identified as 'Ligurians' by the oldest texts about the founding myth of Marseille, but their ethnonym is unambiguously Celtic.

De Bernardo Stempel contends that such linguistically Celtic tribal names suggest that a 'Celto-Ligurian' dialect played an important role among the languages spoken in ancient Ligury. She notes that some lexical items appear to be common to both Ligurian and Celtic, such as cotto- (Alpes Cottiae), gando- (Gandovera), ambi- (pago Ambitrebio), ebu- (Eburelia), medu- (Medutio), seg- (Segesta Tigulliorum), catu- (Catucianum), and roud- (Roudelium).

The similarity between the ancient names of Genoa (Genua), in ancient Liguria, and Geneva (Genaua), in Celtic-speaking territory, has also been highlighted by scholars. Both toponyms may derive from Celtic genu- ('mouth'), a sense appropriate to settlements at a river mouth, though they can also independently continue PIE ǵenu- ('jaw'), with the semantic development from 'jaw' to 'mouth' being attested in Greek. The comparison is therefore compatible with, but does not demonstrate, a Celtic origin.

Arguing for a connection between Ligurian and Celtic languages, de Bernardo Stempel has listed a series of sound changes and suffixes that Ligurian would share with Celtic: IE *bʰ > b, as shown by Comberanea rivus and Badiennon (the latter compared with the Celtic root reflected in Latin badius 'bay-coloured', generally regarded as a Celtic loanword; cf. Old Irish buide 'yellow'); loss of initial p-, as in Ingauni < *ping-amn-ī; *l̥ > al before resonant, as in *Sl̥wes > Salues; lenition of voiced consonants, as in Ligauni < *ligamni; unstressed *-i̯o- > -je-, as shown by Nitielium and Berigiema; o > u before labials, as in Leucumellus and Latumarui; assibilation, as shown by Mezu and Meśiolano; palatal anticipation, as in Airuno, Airasca, Airolo, and Eluveitie; epenthesis, as shown by Berigiema and Alebinna; suffixes *-enko- and *-asko-, as in Bodincos and Vinelasca (analysed by de Bernardo Stempel as < *wind-el-askā).

The comparison with Lepontic carries particular weight: dozens of inscriptions in the Etruscan-derived alphabet of Lugano were long claimed for Ligurian, until the decipherment of the Prestino inscription established them as Celtic. De Bernardo Stempel further identifies a set of innovations that Ligurian would share specifically with Lepontic, including several changes in consonant clusters (*ks > s, *nd > n(n), *st > z), shared case endings (notably a genitive singular *-osjo), a third-person past tense in -te, the suffixes -alo- and -ikno- used to form names from the father's name, and a preference for simple rather than compound personal names. A smaller set of features (genitive singular *-ī, past tense in -tu, the suffix -ikno-) would instead link Ligurian with the Gaulish of the early sources.

=== Non-Celtic features ===
On the other hand, some Ligurian ethnonyms show a weaker or less evident connection to Celtic, such as the name Friniates, which can be hardly regarded as genuinely Celtic. Although Deciates seems to derive from the Proto-Indo-European (PIE) root *deḱ-, it does not appear to be Celtic. Consequently, Javier de Hoz suggests classifying the name as 'restricted Ligurian', given the tribe's geographical location. The ethnic name Taurini, from the Indo-European *tauros ('bull'), does not follow the metathesized Celtic form taruos. According to Delamarre, this could be explained by the influence of Latin or by the preservation of an archaic form.

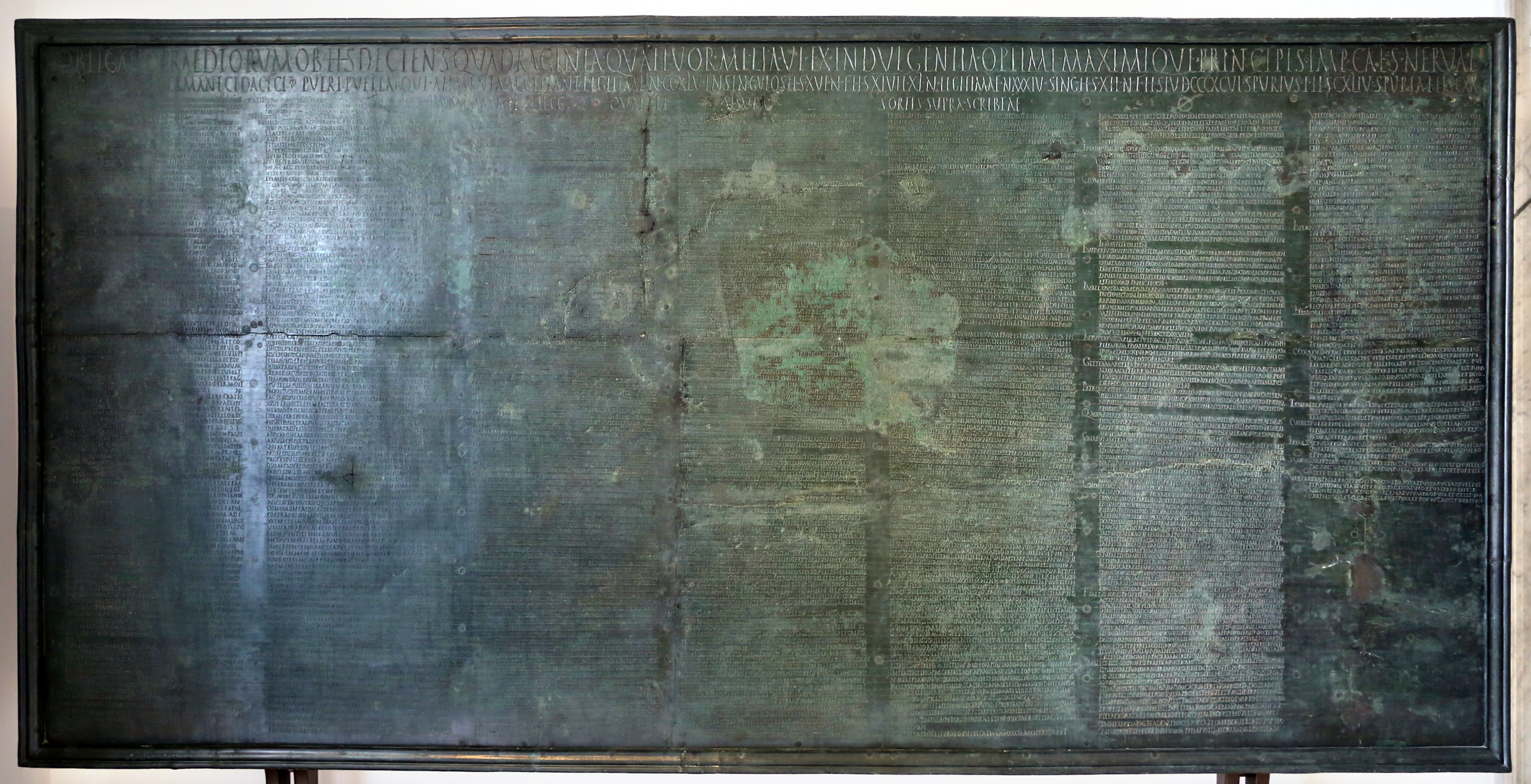
The Tabula alimentaria of Veleia, early 2nd century CE. Its cadastral lists preserve indigenous place names of the Ligurian Apennines, including Poptis, with a -pt- cluster not expected in Celtic.

Similarly, the Ligurian Bodincos ('bottomless'), from PIE *bʰudʰnós, does not display the metathesis of Italo-Celtic *bʰundʰós (cf. Latin fundus, Middle Irish bond). The ethnonym Eguiturii, if derived from PIE *h₁éḱwos ('horse'), retains a velar followed by -w- (spelled ⟨gu⟩) while Gaulish shows the regular development from -ḱw- to -p- in epos ('horse'). However, the name of the Ligurian Epanterii, if it derives from the same stem, does show the Gaulish treatment. The river name Porcobera has traditionally been analysed as a compound of PIE *pork̂- ('fish' or 'salmon') and *bʰer- ('to carry'-, hence 'fish-bearing'). The form preserves the initial *p-, otherwise regularly lost in Celtic (cf. Old Irish orc < *porkos).

Bernard Mees observes that the analysis of the Ligurian onomastic material as Celtic entails phonological developments otherwise unattested in Celtic, such as *upo- > uea- and unstressed *o > a. The toponymic suffix -asc- and the retained *p of Porcobera also make the classification of Ligurian as Celtic problematic. The cluster -pt- preserved in the toponyms Caeptiemam (Polcevera tablet) and Poptis (Tabula Alimentaria of Veleia) is also not expected in Celtic, where inherited *-pt- normally develops to -xt- (cf. Middle Welsh kaeth < *kaxtos, in contrast to Latin captus).

Jürgen Untermann's analysis of the personal names from the Latin inscriptions of Liguria likewise points to a separate Indo-European language or family: Ligurian names are mostly simple, monothematic formations rather than the compounds common in Celtic. In his survey of Continental Celtic toponymy, Patrick Sims-Williams found relatively little support for a significant Celtic linguistic presence in regio Liguria. According to Mees, Ligurian appears to share some phonological features with Celtic while differing significantly in morphology, suggesting it was a separate language with certain similarities to Celtic. He writes that "the Romans did not consider the Ligurians to be Celts, and although there are some evident parallels between Ligurian and Celtic names, these can all be understood as reflecting inherited Indo-European features, not distinctively Celtic traits."
