= Statielli =

Ancient Ligurian people of north-western Italy

The Statielli, also rendered Statellates or Statiellenses, were a Celto-Ligurian people of north-western Italy who lived in the upper basin of the Bormida river, around present-day Acqui Terme, during the Iron Age and the Roman period. They are known chiefly for the events of 173 BC, when the consul Marcus Popillius Laenas attacked and enslaved them after they had surrendered, an act the Senate reversed in the following year. Their principal centre, Carystum, has not been located. The Roman town of Aquae Statiellae (modern Acqui Terme) took its name from them.

== Name ==
The people are named only by Livy, in his account of the events of 173–172 BC, where they appear as Statellates and Ligures Statellates. The ethnic survived into the Roman period in the name of the town of Aquae Statiellae (modern Acqui Terme), and the corresponding form Statiellenses is found in inscriptions.

The ethnonym Statielli carries the suffix -ell-, and the variant Statellates the suffix -ati-, both common in Ligurian names. Petracco Sicardi derives both from a base *stat-io, which she compares to the Latin personal name Statius, frequent across northern Italy from Acqui Terme to Aquileia. It has been derived from an Indo-European root meaning 'to stand, to stay', understood in the sense of 'the natives' or 'those who hold a territory', by contrast with neighbouring groups to whom a movement, recent or remote, was attributed.

Like the other minor peoples of the region, the Statielli are conventionally described as Celto-Ligurian. The label itself is of Hellenistic Greek origin, and it reflects the difficulty, in antiquity as in modern scholarship, of placing these groups firmly on either the Ligurian or the Celtic side.

== Geography ==
The Statielli held an inland district of what is now southern Piedmont, in the upper basin of the Bormida. Eleonora Salomone Gaggero places them between the valley of the Bormida di Millesimo and that of the Orba, with their centre at the unlocated Carystum, the site that later gave its name to the Roman Aquae Statiellae. Ermanno Arslan extends their control eastward to the Scrivia valley, as far as the Bocchetta Pass on the Apennine watershed, which he treats as the boundary with the Viturii Langenses of the Polcevera to the south.

To the west lay the Bagienni, who extended across a wide territory toward the upper Tanaro and the Alpine foothills. The relation of the Statielli to the Dectunini, a small people placed around Libarna in the Scrivia valley and recorded, with the Viturii and other minor groups, in the Sententia Minuciorum of 117 BC, is unclear. They could have been a peripheral group of the Statielli or an independent community. Other minor peoples named in the sources for the wars of the period, among them the Celeiates and Cerdiciates, are placed south of the Po between the Genoese Apennine and Clastidium. The territory and its neighbours fall within the south-western part of the Po plain and the adjacent Ligurian Apennine.

Carystum has not been identified. It is generally placed at or near Acqui Terme, on the site of the later Aquae Statiellae, though Arslan has also proposed Carrosio, near Gavi. (Note: Salomone Gaggero calls Carystum ignota, 'unknown'. Within the same study Arslan gives two different possible sites, Carrosio near Gavi and the site of Aquae Statiellae at Acqui.) The name derives from the Indo-European root *kar- ('rock, height'), which points to a settlement on high ground.

== History ==
=== Origins ===
In the early Iron Age the inland district of southern Piedmont formed part of the wider Ligurian cultural area, without clear ethnic differentiation. The small peoples of the area, anonymous in the earlier record, emerge as named groups only in the later Iron Age, the Statielli becoming recognisable from about the 4th century BC. How these peoples formed is disputed. Arslan argues for a largely endogenous cultural development from a Ligurian substrate, against the view that Golaseccan Celtic bands penetrated cispadane Piedmont in the 6th and 5th centuries BC and pushed the local Ligurians back onto the Apennine ridges.

=== Roman conquest (173–172 BC) ===
In 173 BC the consul Marcus Popillius Laenas, campaigning against the Ligurians, received the surrender of the Statielli and their stronghold Carystum, but then put many of them to death, sold the survivors into slavery and destroyed the town. The Senate intervened against Popillius and, in 172 BC, ordered the enslaved Statielli to be set free. The freed community was resettled north of the Po, and finds in the lower Vercellese, at Palazzolo, have been connected with the displaced group.

=== Roads and Romanization ===
The valleys held by the Statielli and their neighbours carried the routes between the Ligurian coast and the Po plain. When the Via Postumia was laid out in 148 BC to link Genua with Aquileia by way of Libarna and the Scrivia valley, Rome had first to secure the upland peoples who controlled the crossing, the Statielli among them. The Roman town of Aquae Statiellae grew up in the valley near the pre-Roman centre and preserved the people's name. According to Arslan, the upland country from which the Ligurian mountain peoples, the Statielli among them, had threatened Rome was left culturally isolated after the conquest, passing for a long time out of the historical record.

== Settlement and material culture ==
A cremation necropolis of the later Iron Age has been excavated at Montabone, in the valley of the Bogliona stream, in the eastern part of the Statellan territory. For the cispadane peoples as a whole, including the Statielli, Arslan describes a culture in which La Tène material appears only occasionally over a persistent Ligurian substrate, the locally made impasto pottery being the most reliable marker of the population and traceable back to the Bronze Age. He applies the term "incomplete Laténization" to this pattern.

A hoard of silver Celtic coins of the Padane series, recovered at an Apennine pass sanctuary near the Statellan frontier and known as the Serra Riccò hoard, includes an obol type showing a lion with a raised paw that Arslan tentatively assigns to the territory of the Statielli or the Bagienni, though no such coins have been found there. A richly furnished tomb at Libarna, at Rio della Pieve, with Hellenistic pottery brought from Genoa, has been taken by Arslan as evidence that Genoese goods continued to reach Statellan territory before the Roman settlement of the region, although the attribution of Libarna itself is disputed. (Note: Libarna and the nearby hill-fort of Guardamonte are attributed by some scholars to the Dectunini rather than to the Statielli.)
