= Genuates =

Ancient people of Genua (Genoa)

The Genuates (also Genuenses) were the people of ancient Genua (now Genoa), a port on the Ligurian Sea coast, in north-western Italy. Their community grew around an emporion (trading post) active from the late 6th century BC. Their ethnic affiliation, Etruscan or Ligurian, remains uncertain. Allied to Rome from the time of the Second Punic War, the Genuates are known chiefly from the Sententia Minuciorum of 117 BC, a senatorial arbitration that settled a dispute between them and the Viturii Langenses, a Ligurian people of their hinterland.

== Name ==
The Genuates are named in the Sententia Minuciorum, the bronze tablet of 117 BC, where the community of Genua appears under the two forms Genuates and Genuenses.

The etymology of Genuates and Genua is unclear. The suffix -ates is frequent in both Ligurian and Celtic ethnic names, and the similarity with Genaua (modern Geneva), in Celtic-speaking territory, has been taken by some scholars as evidence of a Celtic origin of the name Genua, or of a close relationship between the Ligurian and Celtic languages. Both toponyms may derive from Celtic genu- ('mouth'), a sense appropriate to settlements at a river mouth; but the stem can equally continue PIE ǵenu- ('jaw'), and the semantic development from 'jaw' to 'mouth' is also attested in Greek. The comparison is therefore compatible with, but does not demonstrate, a Celtic origin.

== Geography ==
Genua stood on the Ligurian coast at the centre of the coastal arc, at a node of routes already used in prehistory. The land under the city's direct control was small: even in the 2nd century BC the Sententia Minuciorum shows the territory belonging to the port to have been of limited extent.

The hinterland lay in the Polcevera valley, which runs roughly north to south from the coast just west of Genua to the Apennine watershed. There the arbitration of 117 BC concerned land held by the Genuates and by the Viturii Langenses. Other Ligurian communities, the Odiates, Mentovini, Cavaturini and Dectunini, shared in the common pasture. The valley was crossed by the Via Postumia, laid out in 148 BC, along whose margins markers were set where the road met the limits of the public land.

== Ethnic identity ==
The ethnic identity of the Genuates is uncertain. The pre-Roman settlement was Etruscan in language and material culture, and on that basis some scholars regard its community as Etruscan, whereas ancient sources and the conventional scholarly classification count Genua among the Ligures.

Excavation of the hill of Castello has yielded more than thirty inscriptions, all Etruscan in script and language down to the early 2nd century BC. Giovanni Colonna holds that Etruscan was the only written language of the settlement, and probably the main spoken one, and that the port was an emporion run by a community of Etruscans within Ligurian territory. On this reading the Genuates and Genuenses of the late 2nd century were themselves Etruscans and faithful allies of Rome.

The chief ancient testimony pointing to a Ligurian identity comes from Strabo, who twice calls Genua the "emporion of the Ligures". Colonna reconciles this with his thesis by reading the phrase as a market serving the Ligures rather than one peopled by them. Piera Melli cautions that to call the Genuates of the late 2nd century BC Etruscan is in any case an inference, unsupported by any contemporary source. The epigraphic and material record of the Etruscan emporion runs only from the late 6th to the early 2nd century BC. Between then and the earliest attestation of the Genuates as a people in 117 BC, the settlement declined, was sacked by the Carthaginians and rebuilt by Rome, changes that may have altered its population.

== History ==
=== Pre-Roman Genua ===
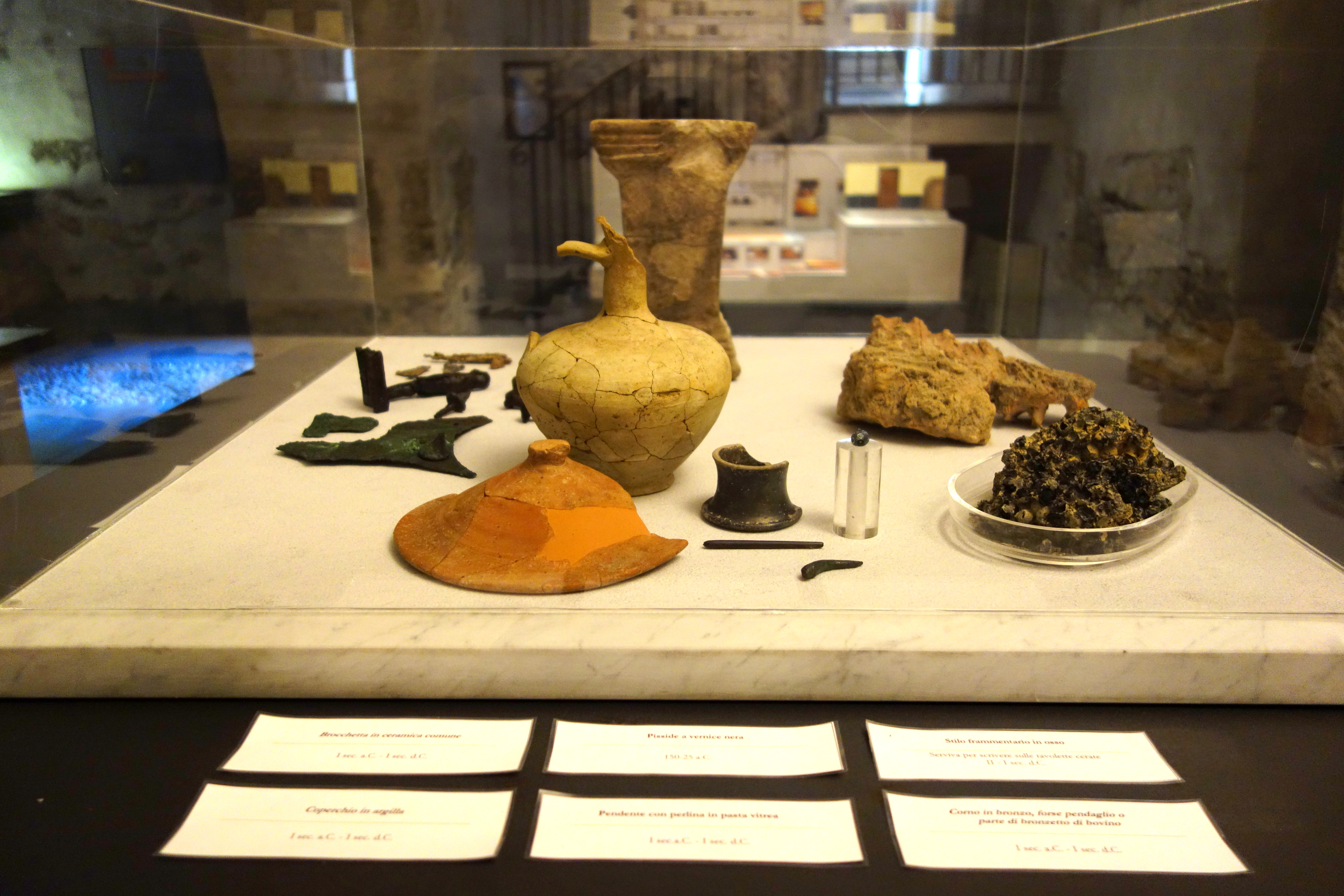
Archaeological fragments, Museo Diocesano (Genoa)

The earliest traces of activity at Genua are traced to the late 7th and 6th centuries BC and consist of Etruscan wine amphorae and other goods left by traders working along the Tyrrhenian coast. From the late 6th century a settlement developed on the hill of Castello, later called an oppidum by Roman writers and defended by a stone circuit from about the middle of the 5th century. It stood at a junction between Etruscans, the Greeks of Massalia and the Celts, drawing settlers from inland Etruria together with Greek, Celtic and Golaseccan individuals. It was the Etruscans who controlled the port, introducing from about 525 BC its language and script, its cults and its funerary rites. Between the late 4th and the 3rd century BC the hilltop settlement entered a lasting decline.

The harbour of Genua was used by the Romans as early as 218 BC, and an alliance is widely thought to have been struck earlier, the port serving as a base at the outset of the Roman advance into the Po plain. The town was destroyed by the Carthaginian commander Mago in 205 BC and rebuilt by Rome under the propraetor Spurius Lucretius in 203 BC, although the archaeology has not confirmed the traditional dates of the Carthaginian attack. By the late 3rd century BC Genua already lay within the commercial orbit of Rome.

=== Sententia Minuciorum (117 BC) ===
The dealings of the Genuates with the communities of their hinterland are documented by the Sententia Minuciorum, a bronze tablet of 117 BC. (Note: The tablet was found in 1506 near Pedemonte (Serra Riccò), in the Polcevera valley, and first published by Agostino Giustiniani, bishop of Genoa, in 1537. It is now in the Museo Civico di Archeologia Ligure at Genoa Pegli. The surviving copy is the one given to the Viturii and displayed at their assembly place, and several copies originally existed.) On a commission from the Senate, the brothers Quintus and Marcus Minucius Rufus inspected the disputed ground, fixed its boundaries with markers and pronounced their award at Rome, a bronze copy being given to each party. The brothers were descendants of the Quintus Minucius Rufus who as consul in 197 BC had won the first substantial victories over the Ligures and become their patronus, an inherited tie that accounts for the protective tenor of their decisions toward the indigenous community.

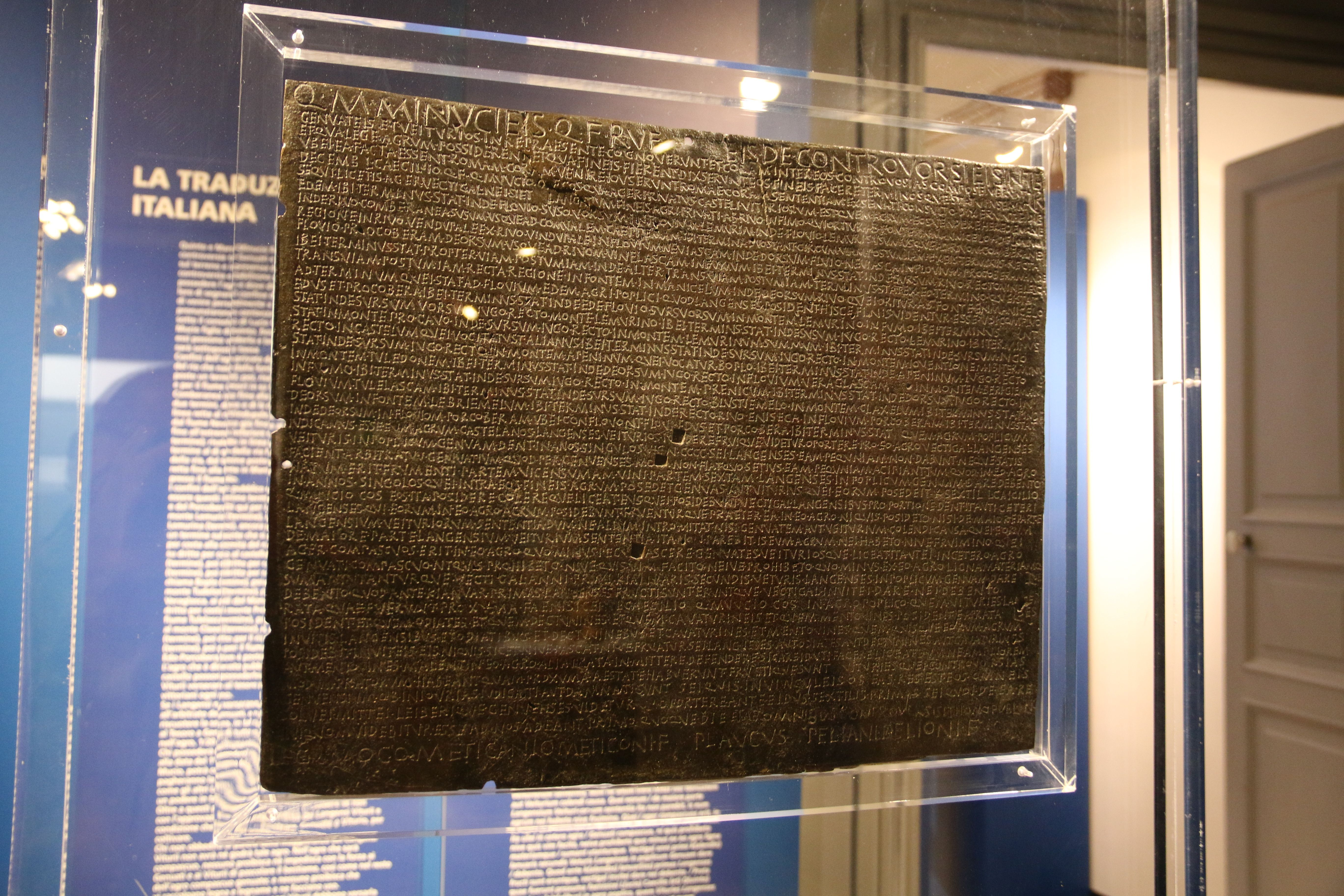
The bronze Sententia Minuciorum (117 BC), the senatorial arbitration that names the Genuates and records their dispute with the Viturii Langenses

The dispute set the Genuates against the Viturii Langenses over land of differing legal status: the private land (ager privatus) of the Viturii, and the public land of the Roman people held in possession by the Langenses. The award required the Langenses Viturii to pay Genua an annual vectigal of 400 victoriati for the public land, or, failing that, a twentieth of its grain and a sixth of its wine, and it ordered the release of Viturii who had been imprisoned in the course of the quarrel.

Saskia Roselaar reads the arrangement as allowing the Langenses to work the public land of Genua in return for the payment. For Tarpin the financial clause is the key to the document: the elements of the conflict all attach to the Viturii, the obligations imposed fall on the Langenses Viturii, and the collection of the vectigal is the responsibility of the Langenses, so that the text records an intermediate stage in the absorption of small Ligurian territories into the Roman administrative system.

The standing of Genua bears on the reading of the arbitration. As a civitas foederata, Genua could not be the object of an adtributio, and Rita Scuderi holds that the relationship cannot be so described, the inscription being earlier than the relevant legislation. The reading of the castellum of the Viturii as a settlement of Roman citizens has likewise been rejected, since allies such as the Genuates could not have imprisoned Roman citizens.

=== Later history ===
The intervention of the Minucii had no lasting effect on the political map. The territory of the Viturii and the neighbouring communities was in time absorbed into the municipal territory of Genua. Genua itself, which down to the grant of the ius Latii had left almost no written record beyond its Etruscan inscriptions, passed to the status of a Roman municipium.

== Settlement and material culture ==
The settlement of the Genuates lay on the hill of Castello, above the harbour inlet later filled to build the Portofranco. The economy was that of an emporion: imported bucchero, Attic black- and red-figure pottery, and transport amphorae from Etruria, Massalia, the Punic coast and the Aegean, alongside local ironworking. The women of the community wore ornaments of amber and glass paste whose closest parallels lie in the Golaseccan and eastern Celtic worlds and in the Po delta.

The hinterland supplied the port through this market with timber for shipbuilding, livestock, hides and honey, and with grain and wine. On present evidence the opening of the Via Postumia in 148 BC did not greatly alter the dispersed pattern of settlement in the upper Polcevera valley, which kept to traditional and conservative forms characteristic of "marginal" areas.
