= Mentovini =

Ancient Ligurian people of north-western Italy

The Mentovini were a minor Ligurian people of north-western Italy, in the hinterland of Genua (modern Genoa). They are known only from the Sententia Minuciorum of 117 BC, a Roman arbitration over land in the Polcevera valley, in which they appear, beside three other small communities, as possessors of meadowland and as users of the common pasture shared with the Genuates and the Viturii Langenses.

== Name ==
The Mentovini are named only in the Sententia Minuciorum, the bronze tablet of 117 BC, where they appear in the form Mentovines (conventionally Mentovini). They are reckoned a Ligurian community, one of several small peoples of the region named in the document beside the Viturii Langenses and the Genuates of the allied port of Genua.

Giulia Petracco Sicardi sees Mentovines as a derivation based on the Latin suffix -ino- from a base *mentouio-, comparable to the modern place-name Montoggio. Other parallels for the base are scarce, the nearest being a divine name in a 1st-century Latin inscription from Spain.

== Geography ==
The Mentovini lived in the country around Genua and the castellum of the Viturii Langenses, in or near the upper Polcevera valley to the north of the city. Their exact territory cannot be fixed. They are named together with three other small communities, the Odiates, Cavaturini and Dectunini, each holding its own portion of land in the same district.

== History ==
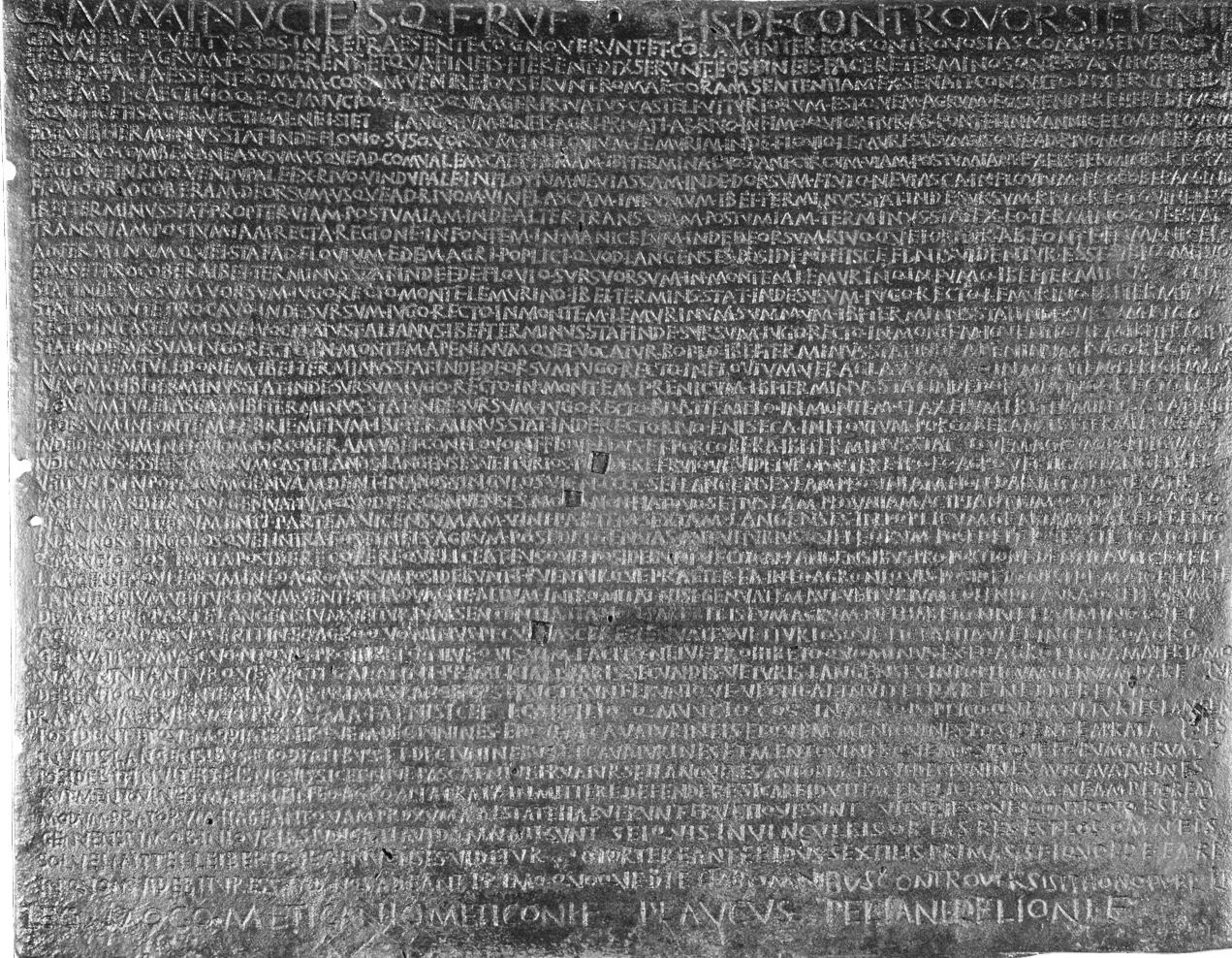
The Sententia Minuciorum, dated to 117 BC and mentioning Mentovini

The Mentovini appear in the Sententia Minuciorum, the award by which the brothers Quintus and Marcus Minucius Rufus, acting for the Roman Senate, settled a land dispute between the Genuates and the Viturii Langenses in 117 BC. Within the public land (ager publicus) at issue, the Mentovini held a portion on which lay meadows (prata). The arbitration protected this holding. On the land each community possessed, no one was to mow, graze or otherwise use the meadows against its will, and the Mentovini, like the others, might lay out, enclose and mow further meadows provided they did not exceed the area held the previous summer.

They also shared with the Genuates and the Viturii Langenses the common pasture (ager compascuus), which provided grazing together with wood and timber. The Mentovini had long worked these lands, grazing their herds and taking wood and hay from them.

The Mentovini were among the Ligurian communities still settled on the territory after the Roman subjugation of the Ligures, whose presence no longer called for military intervention, and whose long-standing rights of pasture could not be withdrawn without risking fresh conflict. Michel Tarpin suggests that the Mentovini and the other small communities of the meadow clause may have been further castella within the territory organised around *Langa.
