= Polcevera Tablet =

Roman bronze arbitration inscription of 117 BC

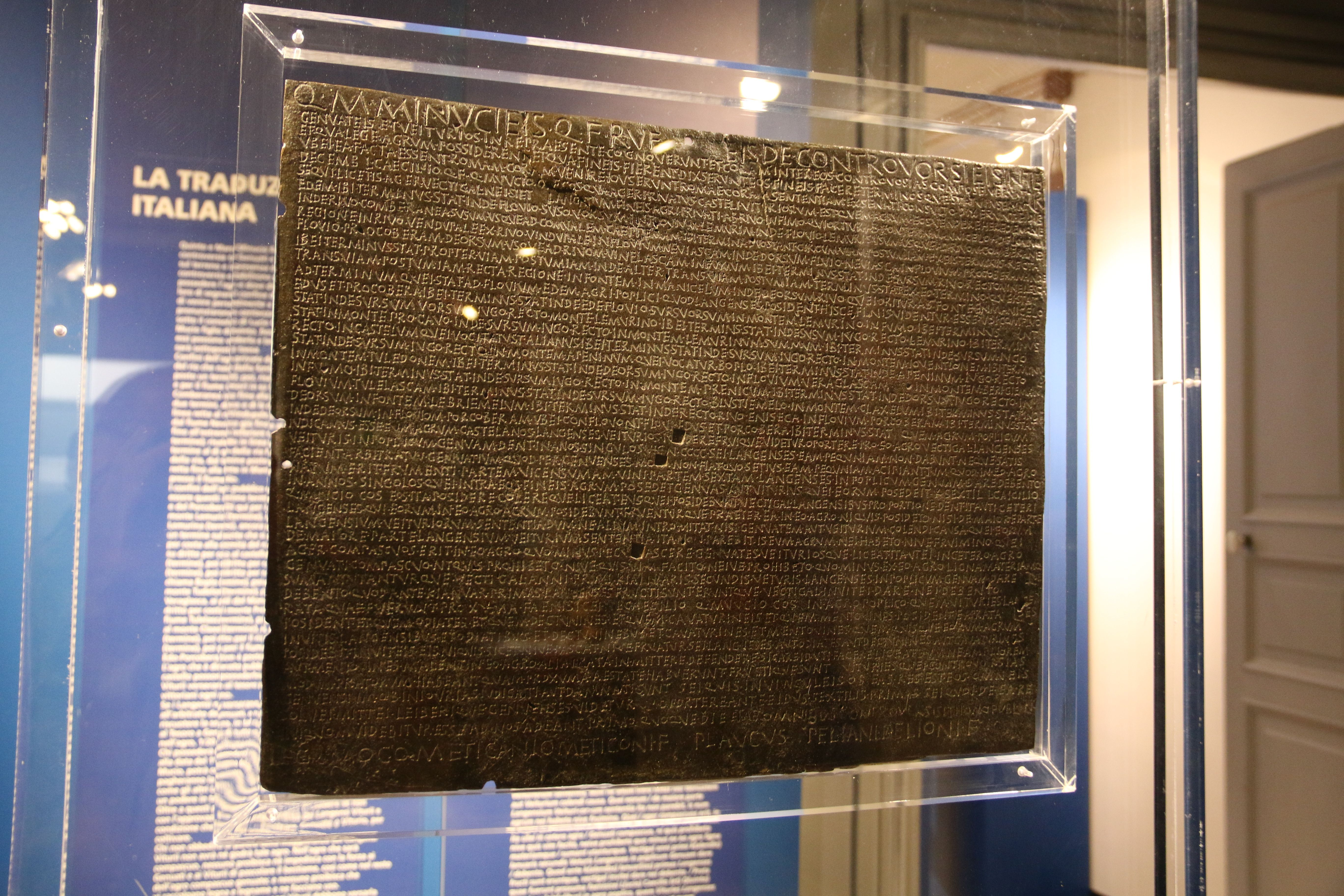
- Material: Bronze
- Writing: Latin
- Created: 117 BC
- Discovered: 1506, near Serra Riccò, Liguria
- Present location: Museum of Ligurian Archeology, Genoa
- Identification: CIL I^{2} 584

The Polcevera Tablet (Latin: Tabula Polcevera), also known as the Sententia Minuciorum, is a Roman bronze tablet inscribed in 117 BC with the ruling of two senatorial arbitrators in a boundary dispute between the allied city of Genua and the Ligurian community of the Viturii Langenses. Found in 1506 in the Polcevera valley north of Genua, it is one of the few legal documents of the Roman Republic to survive complete and legible, and it is a leading source for Roman administration of subject communities, for the law of public and private land, and for the western course of the Via Postumia. The ruling was handed down by the brothers Quintus and Marcus Minucius Rufus under a decree of the Roman Senate (ex senati consulto).

== Discovery and provenance ==
According to the tradition preserved by its first editor, the tablet was found in 1506 near Pedemonte di Serra Riccò, at a locality called Izosecco, by a Genoese countryman named Agostino di Pedemonte, who turned it up while digging with a hoe in his own plot. He took it to Genua hoping to sell it to a coppersmith. The find was recognised by the humanist bishop and geographer Agostino Giustiniani, who informed the city government, which purchased the tablet and placed it in the cathedral of San Lorenzo among other objects of civic importance. Giustiniani published the Latin text at Paris in 1520 and reproduced its contents in Italian in 1537 in his Annali della Repubblica di Genova.

The site of the vanished "villa di Izosecco" was later fixed, from a mid-17th-century estate map in the state archive of Genoa, on the slopes of Santa Maria di Pedemonte on the banks of the Secca torrent, a left-bank tributary of the Polcevera. The ruling was engraved on more than one bronze copy, of which only this example has been recovered. On the evidence of the findspot it has been argued to be the copy issued to the Langenses, perhaps once kept at a local sanctuary or meeting place and carried downhill by a landslide. (Note: Tarpin likewise supposes that at least three or four copies once existed, one at Genua, one at the Langensian centre, one at the castellum of the Viturii, and possibly one at Rome.)

The German scholar Theodor Mommsen made a transcription of the tablet in six hours on 26 November 1844 while gathering material for the Corpus Inscriptionum Latinarum. The tablet is now held in the Museum of Ligurian Archeology in the Villa Durazzo Pallavicini at Pegli, Genoa, where it occupies a room together with finds of roughly the same period.

== Description ==
The inscription runs to forty-six lines of Latin. Most of it is carefully cut, but the closing section (lines 44 to 45) is untidily engraved and less legible, with several words run together without spacing or word-dividers. The tablet has undergone extensive cleaning and restoration since the 1970s. At six points the engraver, having run out of room at the end of a line, broke the final word and set the remaining letters immediately below at the end of the next line, marking them off with a curved stroke, a device of "overhanging line division" also used on the roughly contemporary Polla Stone.

The text is one of the standard editions of Republican legal epigraphy and appears in the major corpora as CIL I^{2} 584 (= CIL V 7749 = ILS 5946 = ILLRP 517 = FIRA III^{2} 163).

The tablet is dated to 117 BC by the consuls named in it. The preamble records that the arbitrators pronounced their judgment at Rome on the Ides of December (13 December) in the consulship of Lucius Caecilius and Quintus Mucius, that is Lucius Caecilius Metellus Diadematus and Quintus Mucius Scaevola the augur. A separate clause fixes the kalends of Sextilis (1 August), during the same consulship, as the reference point up to which existing possession of land was to remain valid.

The Polcevera Tablet is valued as one of the very few complete legal documents of the Roman Republic, and it has been drawn on for the study of Roman territorial and agrarian law, of the ager publicus, of land surveying, of the western course of the Via Postumia, and of the toponymy and onomastics of the Celto-Ligurian peoples. It offers a close view of a transitional phase in the integration of a subject community into the Roman imperial system, at a point when its components were not yet fully assimilated to Roman administrative categories. The arbitration protected the indigenous community from the loss of its land while safeguarding the standing of the allied Genua and the strategic Via Postumia, built in 148 BC by the consul Spurius Postumius Albinus to link the Po Valley with the Ligurian coast. In the longer term the intervention had little effect, since the Langensian centre never became a municipium and its territory was absorbed into that of Genua.

== Text and content ==
=== Preamble and the arbitrators ===
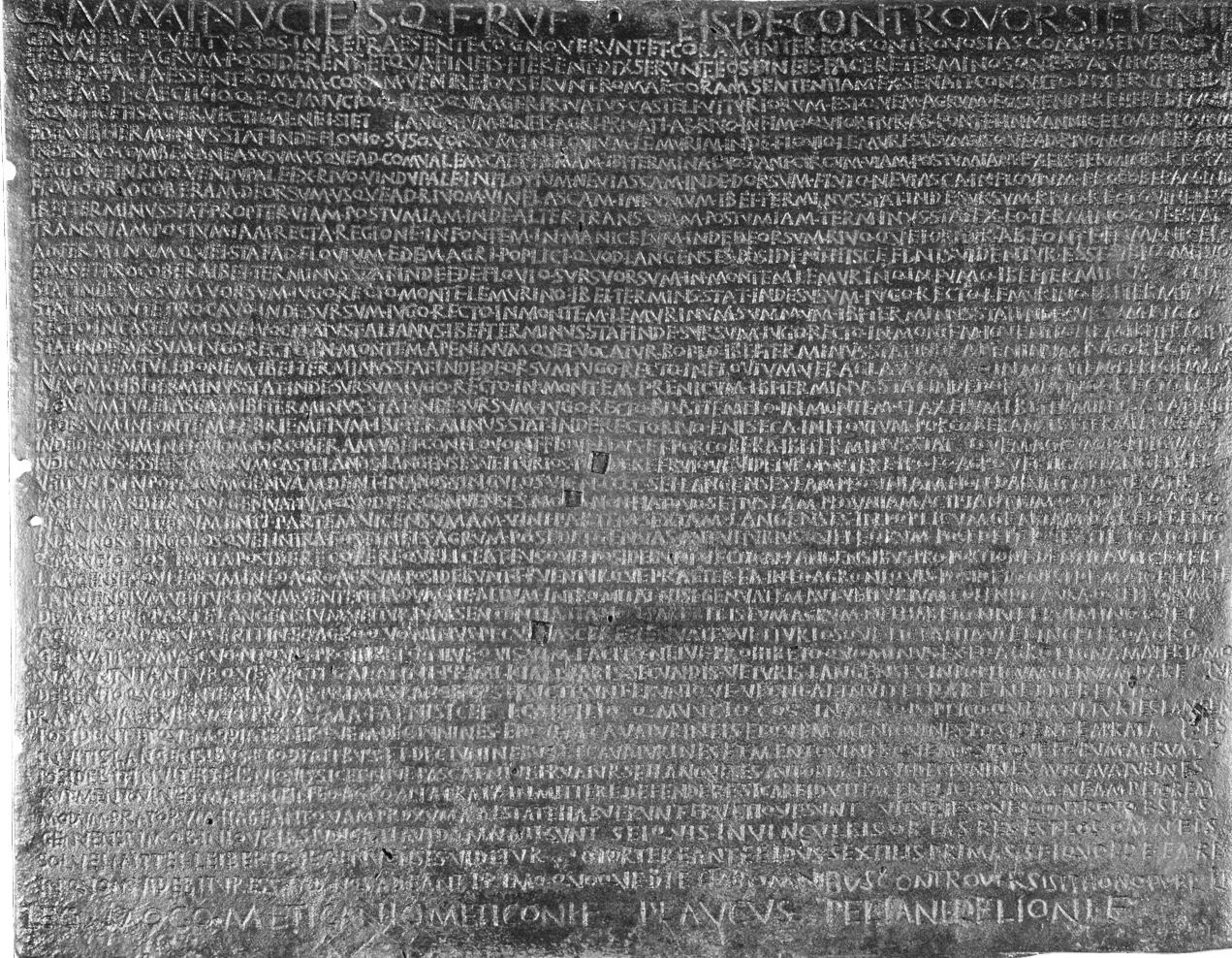
Closer view of the text from the Polcevera Tablet.

In the opening lines, written in enlarged lettering to mark their authority, the brothers Quintus and Marcus Minucius Rufus, sons of Quintus, state that they investigated the disputes between the Genuates and the Veiturii on the spot, settled them in public, laid down on what terms each party should hold land and how the boundaries should run, ordered boundary markers to be set up, and pronounced their judgment at Rome by decree of the senate. The two men acted as arbitrators (arbitri) delegated by the Senate ex senati consulto. The document is therefore distinct from a senatus consultum proper, since the formula senatum consuluerunt is absent and the brothers settled the matter, apparently, on their own authority. (Note: Maria Federica Petraccia observes that the term sententia is itself somewhat misleading, since it suggests a trial rather than an arbitral ruling and overlaps with the phrase sententia senatus consulti used of ordinary senatorial resolutions.)

The brothers were descendants of the consul of 197 BC, Quintus Minucius Rufus, who had campaigned against the Ligures from Genua, and are thought to have inherited from him the patronage over the local Ligurian communities, a relationship reflected in the protective character of their decisions. Their appointment has been explained by these regional ties rather than by a distinguished record of office.

=== Delimitation of the land ===
The ruling proceeds, as was normal in Roman territorial law, by defining in turn the tracts of differing legal condition. It first sets aside the private land (ager privatus) of the castellum of the Viturii, which its holders might sell and bequeath and which was to bear no rent (vectigal). It then delimits the private land of the Langenses (or Langates) and the portion of public land (ager publicus) that the Langenses held, tracing the boundaries by watercourses, springs, ridges and the line of the Via Postumia, which is named repeatedly as a boundary. No fewer than twenty-one boundary markers (termini) were set along these limits, on mountain slopes and summits, at springs, and along streams. The boundary description follows the technical tradition of the Roman land surveyors, as codified in the treatise of Hyginus.

A further tract of public land, introduced by the words "which we judge to be public" (iudicamus), was assigned for the possession and use of the castellani Langenses Veiturii. Two further categories were regulated: the common pasture (ager compascuus), on which the Genuates and the Veiturii alike might graze cattle and take firewood and timber, and the meadows (prata) within the public land, whose management is set out for the Langenses Viturii together with the minor tribes Odiates, Dectunini, Cavaturini and Mentovini. In the ruling on the assigned public land, the arbitrators laid down that its holders should hold and enjoy it, a clause rendered by E. H. Warmington as: whatever land the arbitrators judge to be public, "the fort-holders, namely the Langensian Veturii, ought to hold and enjoy".

=== Financial provisions ===
For the public land assigned to them the Langenses Veiturii were to pay an annual rent of 400 victoriati into the public treasury at Genua. If they failed to pay, Genua might instead take a twentieth part of the grain and a sixth part of the wine produced on that land in the year. Any Genuan or Viturian holding land there was required to pay the Langenses a proportional rent "like the other Langenses", and only the Langenses Veiturii, by majority decision, might admit future holders, so as to exclude those who did not pay. Michel Tarpin has argued that this financial mechanism is the key to the whole document, since it defines precisely which communities were liable and to whom, and clarifies their relations.

=== Release of prisoners and appeals clause ===
Near the end the ruling orders that any of the Veiturii held in prison as a result of the disputes with the Genuates be released before the next Ides of Sextilis (13 August). There follows a much-discussed appeals clause (lines 44 to 45): if anyone should think the ruling unfair in this matter, they were to come "to us" (ad nos) at the earliest opportunity. The closing words of this clause (et ab omnibus controversis et hono publ. li) are corrupt and resist interpretation. The tablet ends with the names of two legates who apparently represented the parties, Moco Meticanius son of Meticonus, and Plaucus Pelianius son of Pelionus.

== Parties to the dispute ==
The Genuates were the inhabitants of Genua, which by 117 BC was an allied city of Rome (civitas foederata). Its people did not receive Latin rights and then Roman citizenship until the following century. (Note: Marinella Pasquinucci refers to the Genuates in the 2nd century BC as "citizens of Roman Genua"; this characterisation has been criticised by Maciej Piegdoń, who stresses that Genua was still a civitas foederata at the time of the ruling.)

The Viturii Langenses (or Langates) were a small Ligurian community settled north of Genua, in the upper Polcevera valley, with a castellum at its centre. They are named in the inscription under several forms, including Veiturii, Viturii, Langates, Langenses and Langenses Veiturii, and the Genuates appear both as Genuates and as Genuenses. The neighbouring peoples Odiates, Dectunini, Cavaturini and Mentovini appear only in the clause on the meadows.

The subject of the quarrel is not stated in the text and has been reconstructed from the outcome. On the common view it arose in the upper Polcevera valley and concerned the occupation of public land and rights of grazing. Tarpin infers from the combination of an annual rent imposed on the Viturii and the release of imprisoned Viturii that Genua had not been receiving the expected payment, while the castellani complained of the high-handed, perhaps unlawful, conduct of the Genuates. Ralph Häussler has described the conflict as one between cultivators and herders.

== Interpretation ==
Tarpin argues that the Viturii were a subgroup of the Langenses, pointing to the compound name Langenses Veiturii and to the phrase "like the other Langenses" (ita uti ceteri Langenses). On this reading the Langenses formed the single fiscal and civic community recognised by Rome, with their centre at a place called Langa, plausibly identified with modern Langasco, while at least one further castellum, that of the Viturii, lay within their territory. The tablet is, on this account, the earliest official document to illuminate the Roman concept of the castellum as an indigenous hilltop or fortified settlement rather than a Roman foundation. The castellum of the Viturii has been placed in the Secca valley, and the Langensian centre at Langasco in the valley of the Verde and the Ricco.

The legal position of the Langenses Viturii is disputed. Some scholars regard them as adtributi to Genua, subordinated to the allied city for administrative purposes; others have taken them to be Roman socii. Tarpin sees them instead as a subgroup of the Langenses retaining limited autonomy around their castellum. The status of the public land is likewise contested. Saskia Roselaar took it to be public land of Genua worked by the Langenses in return for the rent, whereas Tarpin holds that in a senatorial arbitration the termini can only mark the public land of the Roman people, entrusted to the Langenses in possession.

The corrupt end of line 45 has attracted repeated attempts at emendation, most treating the final li as an abbreviated verb derived from liberare. In 1931 George A. Harrer implicitly proposed reading the final LI as an instance of overhanging line division belonging to the previous line; Michael Fronda, who examined the tablet in 2011, rejected this on both grammatical and physical grounds and upheld the reading found in the printed editions. Two further questions remain open. Whether the appeals clause refers to the entire ruling or only to the immediately preceding provision on the release of prisoners is disputed, Carlo Castello and Marco Bianchini favouring the narrower sense against Emilio Sereni and others. The reference of ad nos is also debated. Warmington took it to point to the local legates named in the last line, but most scholars, and Fronda, understand it of the Minucii arbitrators, to whom aggrieved parties were to appeal at Rome.
