= Viturii =

Ancient Ligurian tribe

The Viturii (also Viturii Langates or Viturii Langenses) were a Ligurian tribe living around modern Campomorone, in the hinterland of Genoa, in the upper Polcevera valley, during the Iron Age.

== Name ==
They are attested as Viturii Langates (or Langenses) on the Sententia Minuciorum, dated to 117 BC.

The name Viturii may be built on a suffix -turii, also found in the ethnonyms Nemeturii (a people of the upper Verdon or Var valley), Eguiturii (upper Verdon valley) and Turi (posited to reflect an original Es-turi).

Langenses and Langates are formed on a toponym *Langa (presumed to be Langasco) with the alternating suffixes -enses and -ates. The place name Langasco (in modern Campomorone), a settlement documented since the end of the 10th century AD, is considered to be of Ligurian origin.

== Geography ==
The Viturii were settled in the hinterland north of Genua (modern Genoa), in the upper Polcevera valley, an area crossed by the strategic Roman road via Postumia.

Their fortlet (castellum) stood in the valley. The Langenses took their name from *Langa, preserved in that of modern Langasco (now a frazione of Campomorone) with which their centre is generally identified. The precise site of the castellum is nonetheless disputed: most scholars place it at or around Langasco, while it has also been located on the Monte Castello hill.

Their territory was located east of the Ingauni, and west of the Tigulli. Other minor groups from the hinterland, the Odiates, Dectunini, Cavaturini, and Mentovini, are also mentioned along the Viturii in the dispute against the Genuates.

== History ==
Soon after the Roman conquest and reorganisation of the Ligurian territory around 200 BC, the Viturii came into conflict with the Genuates, the citizens of Genua (modern Genoa), an ally of Rome. The dispute arose because lands once belonging to the Viturii and confiscated after their defeat had been partially reassigned to them by Rome as ager privatus, which they held in full ownership and could pass on to their heirs. A larger portion of the ager publicus was partly assigned to the Genuates and partly granted to the Viturii in exchange for a tribute (vectigal) owed to Rome through the Genuates.

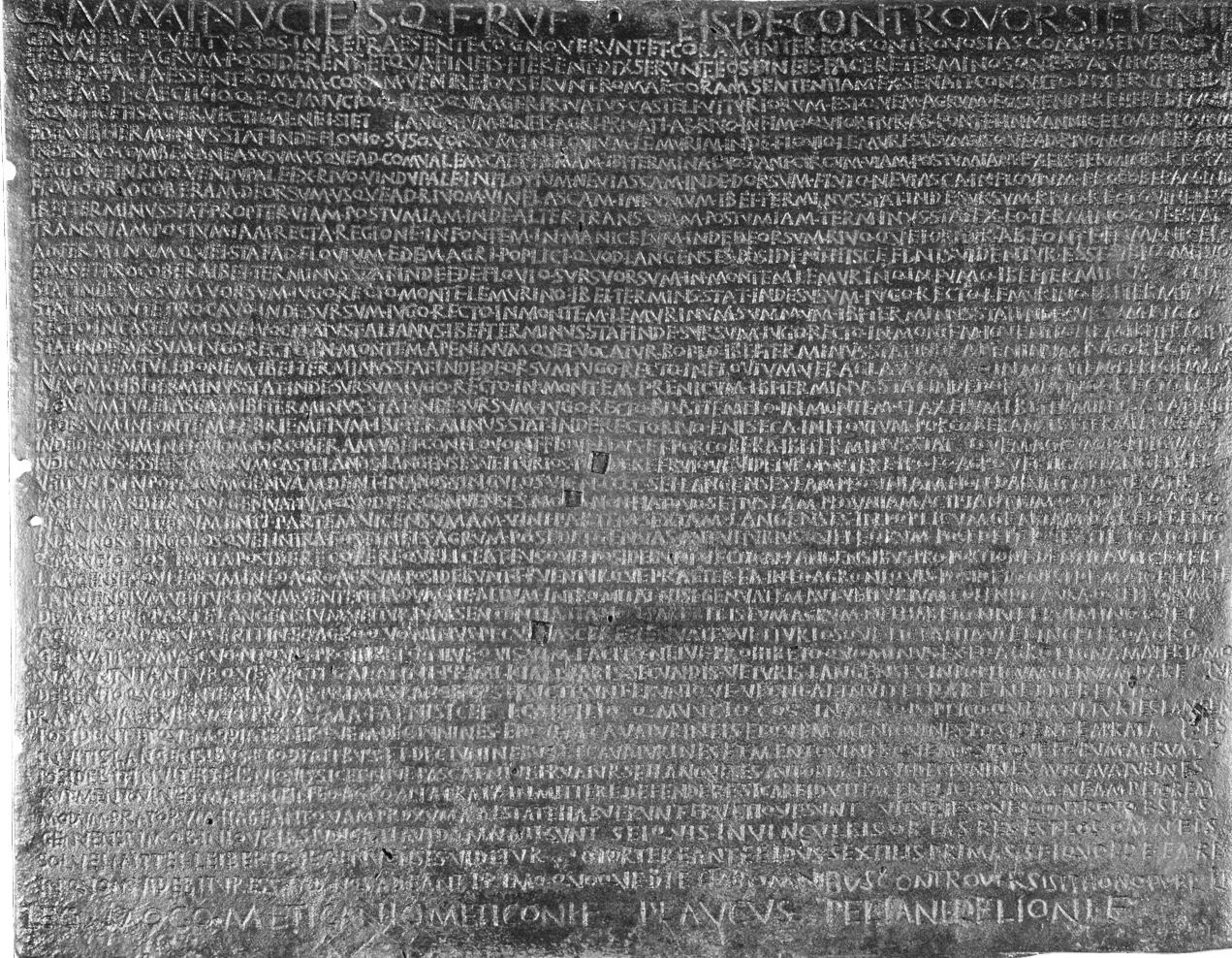
The Sententia Minuciorum, dated to 117 BC and mentioning the dispute between the Viturii and Genuates.

As their population grew and agricultural needs increased, the Viturii expanded from herding into grain and forage cultivation, moving into the valleys in search of more fertile land. This brought them into conflict with the Genuates, who sought to maintain the economic dominance over the inland regions granted to them by Rome. The situation escalated when Genuates magistrates judged and imprisoned several Viturii, accusing them of occupying lands they considered their own. To settle the matter, the Genuates appealed to Rome, and the Senate appointed two arbitri, the brothers Quintus Minucius Rufus and Marcus Minucius Rufus, descendants of the consul who had campaigned successfully against the Ligures of the hinterland in 197 BC and was likely appointed their patronus.

As recorded by the Sententia Minuciorum (117 BC), Roman mediators surveyed the valley and defined the boundaries of both the ager privatus (the private land held as the proprietas of the Viturii, for which they were not required to pay any rent) and the ager publicus (the communal and cultivated lands). The Viturii were required to pay an annual sum to Genoa to use the ager publicus. To raise this amount, their assembly could assign temporary or permanent possession of individual plots to Viturii or to Genuates in exchange for a proportional tax (vectigal pro portione), without the right to evict occupants who had settled there for a certain period. Roman mediators set deadlines for the implementation of their decisions, established compensation and penalties, and granted amnesty to the Viturii imprisoned by the Genuates before the arbitration. The sentence issued by the Minucii brothers was regarded as impartial and lenient toward the Genuates, confirming their privileges while not harming the Viturii, with the aim of securing reconciliation.

== Political organisation ==
The Viturii, along with these other minor Ligurian groups of the hinterland, appear to have been on the margins of the territory controlled by Roman Genua, and connected to the port city through trade. These communities were marginalised by the Roman conquest of the area and by the mechanisms employed by Rome to control their territory, both in relation to Genua and to the via Postumia.

The Genuates and the Viturii had an asymmetrical political relationship with Rome, reflected in the fact that some members of the Viturii had been judged by Genoese magistrates. The Genuates were foederati of Rome, the Viturii, together with the other groups, were adtributi, meaning that although they possessed their own territory and personal rights, they lacked jurisdictional and administrative autonomy and depended on the Genuates in these areas.

The relation between the Viturii, Odiates, Dectunini, Cavaturini, and Mentovini is not transparent. Michel Tarpin observes that only the Genuates are named consistently throughout the tablet. The indigenous community, by contrast, appears under several names: Viturii, Langenses, Langenses Viturii and castellani, each tied to a different aspect of the dispute. He concludes that the Viturii were probably a subgroup of the Langenses, a community still being integrated into the Roman administrative framework. Within it, fiscal responsibility lay with the Langenses of *Langa.

== Bibliography ==
- Barruol, Guy (1969). Les Peuples préromains du Sud-Est de la Gaule: étude de géographie historique. E. de Boccard. OCLC 3279201.
- Pasquinucci, Marinella (2019). "Romans and "Marginal" Ligures in Northwestern Italy: The Polcevera Valley Case Study". Journal of Eastern Mediterranean Archaeology and Heritage Studies. 7 (4): 466–481. doi:10.5325/jeasmedarcherstu.7.4.0466. ISSN 2166-3548.
- Piegdoń, Maciej (2024). "Sententia Minuciorum/Tabula Polcevera from 117 BCE – arbitration as an instrument for resolving disputes among allies during the Republican period and a source to analyse Rome's policy regarding subordinate lands". In Gremium. Studies in History, Culture and Politics (18). doi:10.61826/ig.vi18.449. ISSN 1899-2722.
- Petraccia, Maria Federica (2019). "The Polcevera Tablet". The Roman Senate as arbiter during the Second Century BC. Brepols. pp. 133–169. ISBN 978-2503586892.
- Tarpin, Michel (2021). "La sententia Minuciorum: la procedura finanziaria come chiave dell'interpretazione territoriale". In Giorcelli Bersani, Silvia; Venturino, Marica (eds.). I Liguri e Roma. Un popolo tra archeologia e storia. Studi e ricerche sulla Gallia Cisalpina (in Italian). Vol. 29. Rome: Edizioni Quasar. pp. 195–201. ISBN 978-88-5491-172-7.
