= Dectunini =

Ancient Ligurian tribe

The Dectunini were an ancient Ligurian tribe living in the hinterland of Genoa, around Libarna (in modern Serravalle Scrivia), during the Iron Age.

== Name ==
They are attested in the forms Dectunines and Dectuninebus on the Sententia Minuciorum (117 BC).

The ethnic name Dectunini carries the suffix -in- attached to a base *dek-t-un(o)-. Giulia Petracco Sicardi sees a possible Indo-European root *dek̑- ('to choose, approve, pay honour'), also present in the Ligurian name Deciates.

== Geography ==
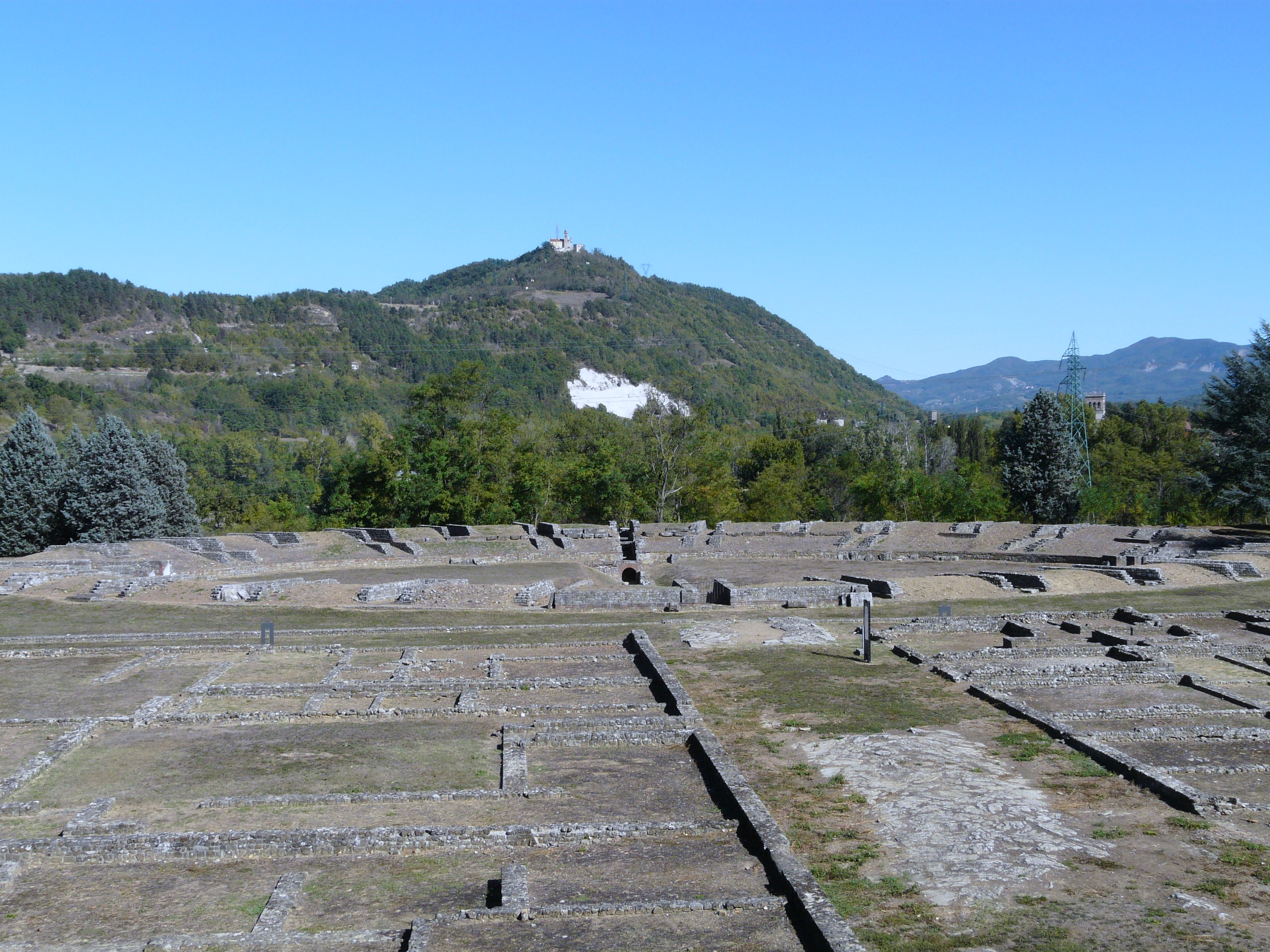
Roman ruins of Libarna

They lived in the hinterland of Genua (modern Genoa), probably around Libarna (in modern Serravalle Scrivia), between the Anamari and the Statielli. They are also associated with the settlement of Guardamonte.

It is not clear how they stood in relation to the Statielli, whether as a peripheral group or as an independent territorial community.

== History ==
The Dectunini are credited with the foundation of Libarna, which could be one of the fifteen Ligurian villages that, according to Livy, surrendered to Q. Minucio Rufo in 197 BC during the Roman conquest of the region.

They are mentioned in the Tavola del Polcevera (117 BC) along with other tribes from the hinterland of Genua, namely the Viturii, Odiates, Cavaturini and Mentovini, in the dispute against the Genuates concerning the occupation of communal land (ager publicus) and grazing rights.

== Bibliography ==
- Arslan, Ermanno A. (2019). "Laevi e Statielli, popoli celto-liguri cispadani tra Po e Ticino nel bacino del torrente Arquata: due casi di latenizzazione incompiuta". La chevauchée des Celtes: mélanges offerts à Venceslas Kruta. Yoran. ISBN 978-2-36747-068-9.
- Pasquinucci, Marinella (2019). "Romans and 'Marginal' Ligures in Northwestern Italy: The Polcevera Valley Case Study". Journal of Eastern Mediterranean Archaeology and Heritage Studies. 7 (4): 466–481. doi:10.5325/jeasmedarcherstu.7.4.0466. ISSN 2166-3548.
- Petracco Sicardi, Giulia; Caprini, Rita (1981). Toponomastica storica della Liguria (in Italian). Genoa: Sagep. ISBN 88-7058-023-7.
