= Pontedecimo =

District north of Genoa, Italy

Coordinates: 44.498°N 8.904°E

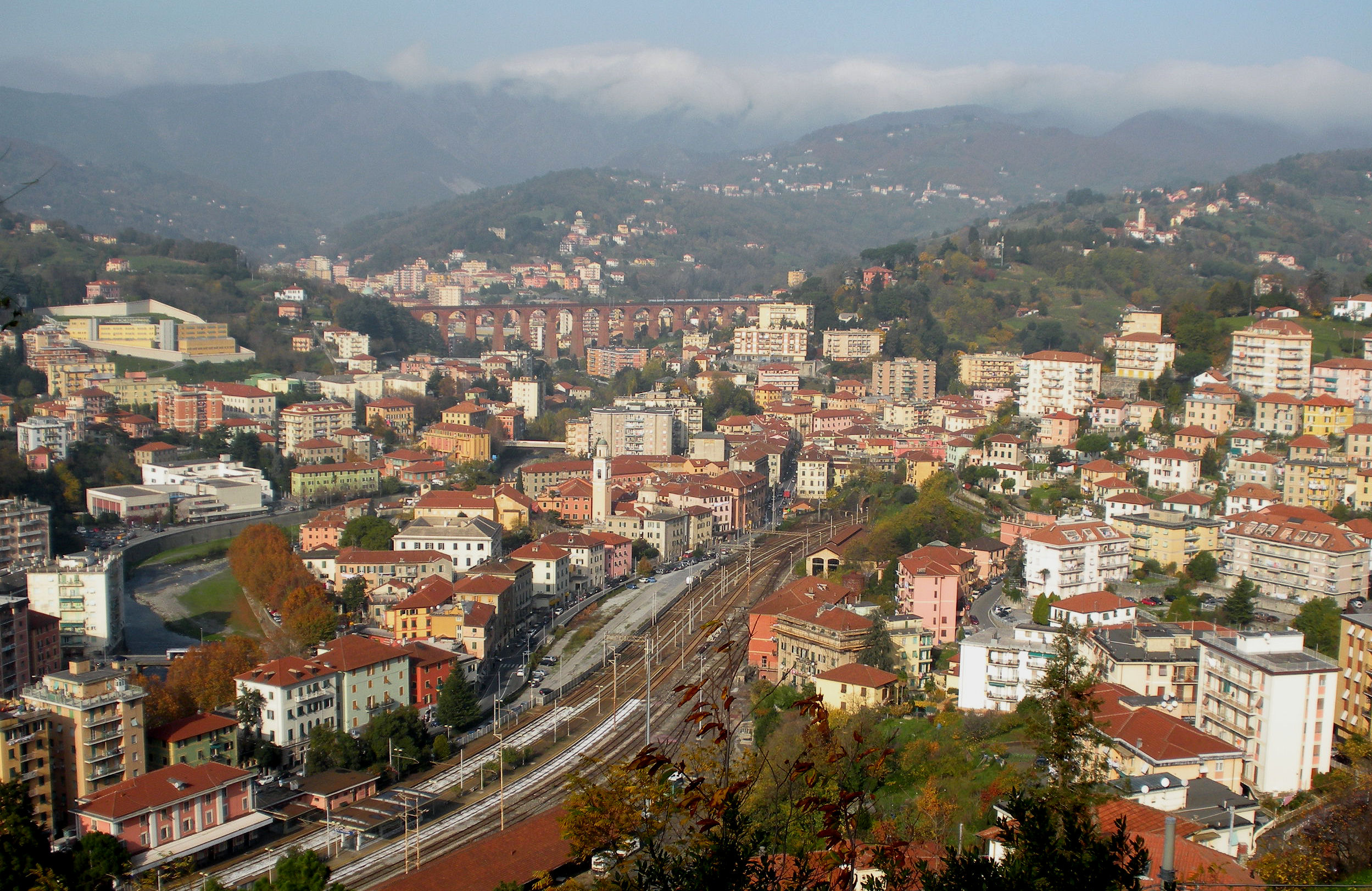
Panorama

Pontedecimo is a district on the far northern outskirts of the Italian city of Genoa, and is located in the Polcevera valley.
