= Joshua Whatmough =

English linguist (1897–1964)

Joshua Whatmough in 1955

Joshua Whatmough (June 30, 1897 – April 25, 1964) was an English linguist, professor, and writer from Rochdale, Lancashire who served as the president of the Linguistics Society of America in 1951. He was also the chairman of the department of comparative philology at Harvard University (renamed to "linguistics" under his leadership in 1951) from 1926 to his retirement in 1963. He studied comparative philology and classics at the University of Manchester and the University of Cambridge.

== Biography ==
Whatmough was born in Rochdale, England, the son of iron moulder and a wool weaver Walter and Elizabeth (née Hollows) Whatmough. He received a Master of Arts degree from the University of Manchester in 1919. He graduated also with an M.A. from Emmanuel College, Cambridge in 1926. He additionally received an honorary doctorate from the University of Dublin. His first teaching job was at the University College of North Wales. He was married to G. Verona Taylor with whom he had 2 children.

== Books ==
- Language: A Modern Synthesis 1956, reissued in paperback
- Language, The Measure of Man (1963)
- The Dialects of Ancient Gaul (1970)
