= Monte Castello (Liguria) =

Mountain in Italy

- Location within Italy

Highest point
- Elevation: 1,092 m (3,583 ft)
- Coordinates: 44°36′50″N 09°05′04″E

Geography
- Location: Liguria / Piemonte, Italy
- Parent range: Ligurian Apennines

Monte Castello is a mountain in Liguria, northern Italy, part of the Ligurian Apennines. It is located in the provinces of Genoa and Alessandria. It lies at an altitude of 1092 metres.

== Conservation ==
The mountain since 1989 is included in the Parco naturale regionale dell'Antola.
