= Sabates (tribe) =

Ancient Ligurian people

The Sabates were an ancient Ligurian people living in Vada Sabatia (modern Vado Ligure), on the coast of Liguria (northwest Italy). Their harbour was one of the few sheltered natural ports on the Ligurian shore and the coastal terminus of a Roman road network reaching across the Apennines into the Po Valley. The bay served as a base for the Carthaginian fleet during the Second Punic War, and the harbour was in use from at least the 2nd century BC into late antiquity.

== Name ==
They are named as Sabates by Strabo, who uses the ethnic to mark the western limit of their coastal territory relative to Genua.

The ethnonym Sabates is a Ligurian name built with the suffix -āti- on a probably toponymic base *sabo-. Giulia Petracco Sicardi relates this base to *Sauon- (underlying Sauone, modern Savona), the two standing as variants of one another.

The place-name Vada Sabatia is a hybrid compound of the Latin common noun vada ('shoals, fords') and the latinized ethnic Sabates.

== Geography ==
The Sabates held a stretch of the Ligurian coast west of the Genuates of Genua. In the coastal list of Pomponius Mela their centre Sabatia stands between Genua and Albingaunum to the west. Their territory centred on the wide, open bay of Vada Sabatia (modern Vado Ligure), one of the few good natural harbours on a coast that is otherwise high, rocky and poor in shelter.

The bay offered deep water suitable for anchorage and was large enough to hold whole fleets. The island of Bergeggi, to the south, gave further shelter and served as a lookout point, probably with a lighthouse. In the Itinerarium Maritimum, a portolan of the 5th or 6th century, Vada Sabatia is one of the few Ligurian anchorages to qualify as a portus.

Inland routes converged on the bay. The Via Aemilia Scauri of 101 BC was retraced by the Via Julia Augusta, inaugurated in 13 BC and which set out from Vada Sabatia. Further routes ascended the Tanaro basin toward Augusta Taurinorum. The position of the bay at the seaward end of a low pass made it a natural emporium linking maritime traffic with the hinterland.

== History ==
During the Second Punic War the bay of Vada Sabatia served as a base for the Carthaginian fleet. Under Rome the site developed from the 2nd century BC. Radiocarbon dating of sea grass from the latest pre-Roman harbour deposits gives a range of 320 to 210 BC.

The finds place the harbour's origins in the 2nd century BC and its height in the 1st century AD. It continued in use on a reduced scale into the following century, declined markedly in the 3rd and 4th centuries, and saw some activity as late as the 6th century AD.

== Settlement and material culture ==
Their principal settlement is recorded as Sabatia by Pomponius Mela, among the coastal centres of Liguria, as portus Vadorum Sabatium by Pliny the Elder, and as Vadis Sabatis in the Antonine Itinerary.

No comprehensive plan of the Roman settlement has been recovered. The focus of the town probably lay in the Costa district near the course of the River Segno, where partially verifiable sources report substantial public buildings, perhaps service structures for the port. The port installations themselves have not been located, though geoarchaeological study points to the mouth of the Segno as their likely site.

== Economy and trade ==
Their harbour belonged to the long-distance commercial network of the western Mediterranean. The earliest significant finds, black-glazed wares of the 2nd century BC, attest contact with the Tyrrhenian world. From the later 1st century BC and through the 1st century AD the traffic was dominated by transport amphorae: Tyrrhenian and Tarraconensian wine, Baetic oil, wine and fish sauce, together with Gaulish, Adriatic, Sicilian, Aegean-Cretan and Anatolian containers, and finally African products that attest activity into the 5th and 6th centuries AD.
