= Val Polcevera =

One of the main valleys crossing Genoa, Italy

Coordinates: 44.4400°N 8.8900°E

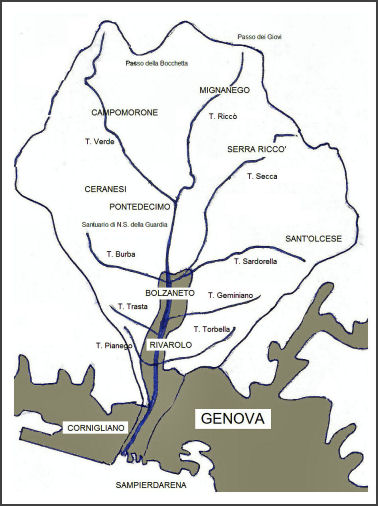
Map of the Val Polcevera

Val Polcevera is one of the main valleys crossing Genoa, taking its name from the eponymous river. It is one of two valleys bordering the historic core of the city, along with Val Bisagno.
