= Via Postumia =

Ancient Roman road in northern Italy

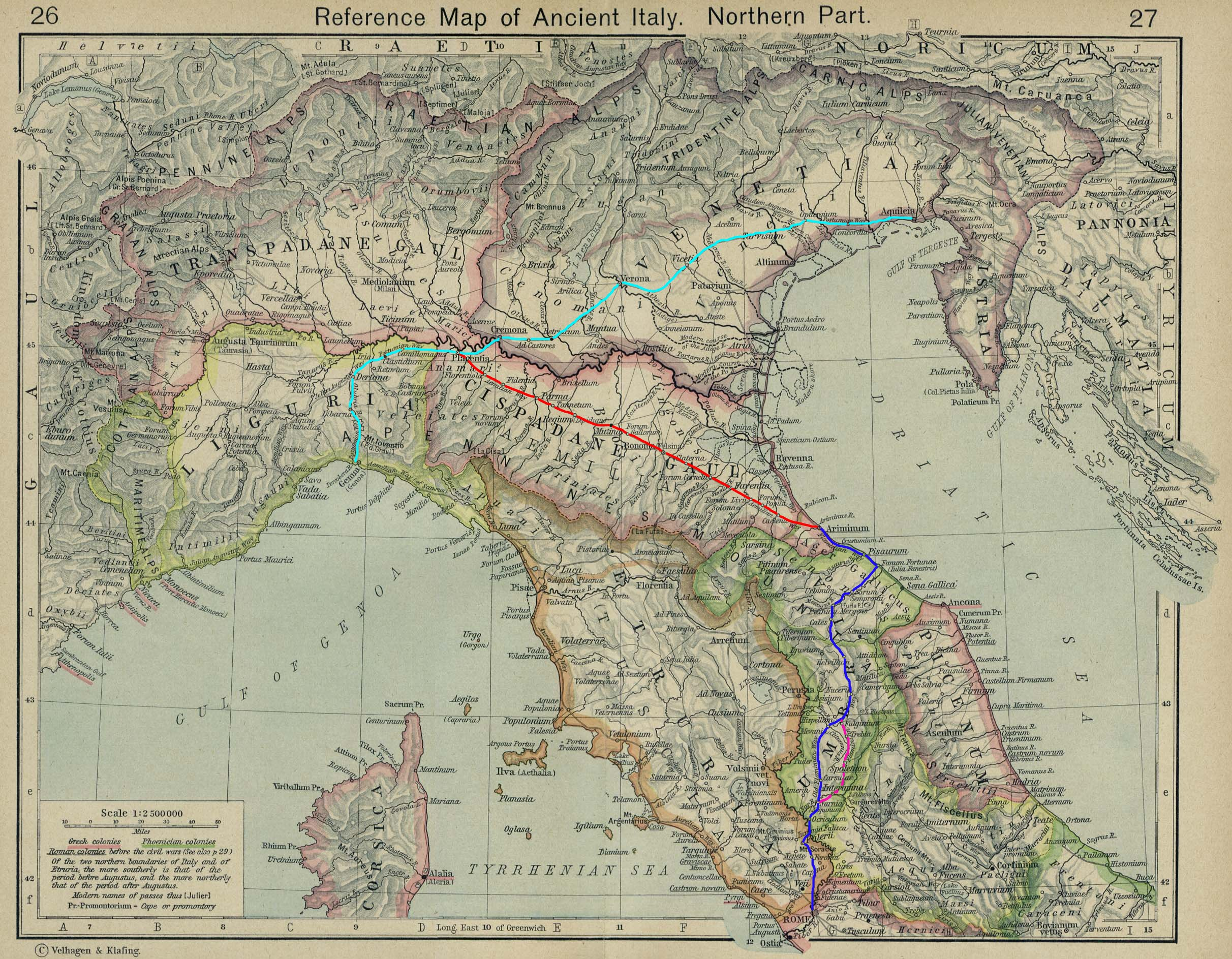
Via Postumia is highlighted in light blue. It is reached from Rome at Placentia via the Via Flaminia (dark blue) followed by the Via Aemilia (red).

The Via Postumia was an ancient military Roman road of northern Italy constructed in 148 BC by the consul Spurius Postumius Albinus Magnus.

It ran from the coast at Genoa through the mountains to Dertona, Placentia (the termination of the Via Aemilia) and Cremona, just east of the point where it crossed the Po River. The Via Postumia and the via Aemilia were the most important axes of traffic in Cisalpine Gaul.

From Cremona the road ran eastward to Bedriacum, the current town of Calvatone, where it forked, one branch running to the right to Mantua, the other to the left to Verona, crossing the Adige river on the Ponte Pietra, the only bridge on the Adige river at that time, and then traversing the Venetian plain, crossing the Piave River at Maserada sul Piave until finally reaching Aquileia, an important military frontier town founded by Rome in 181 BC. The Roman conquest of Liguria depended upon this road, and several of the more important towns owed their origin largely to it. Cremona was its central point, the distance being reckoned from it both eastwards and westwards.

Via Julia Augusta is the name given to the Roman road by Augustus Caesar's efforts starting in 13 BC to merge the Via Aemilia Scauri with the Via Postumia, running from Placentia (modern Piacenza) to a triumphal arch in La Turbie, France. It is later extended to Arelates (modern Arles) joining the Via Domitia, through Dertona (Tortona), Vada Sabatia (Vado Ligure), Albingaunum (Albenga) and Album Intimilium (Ventimiglia).

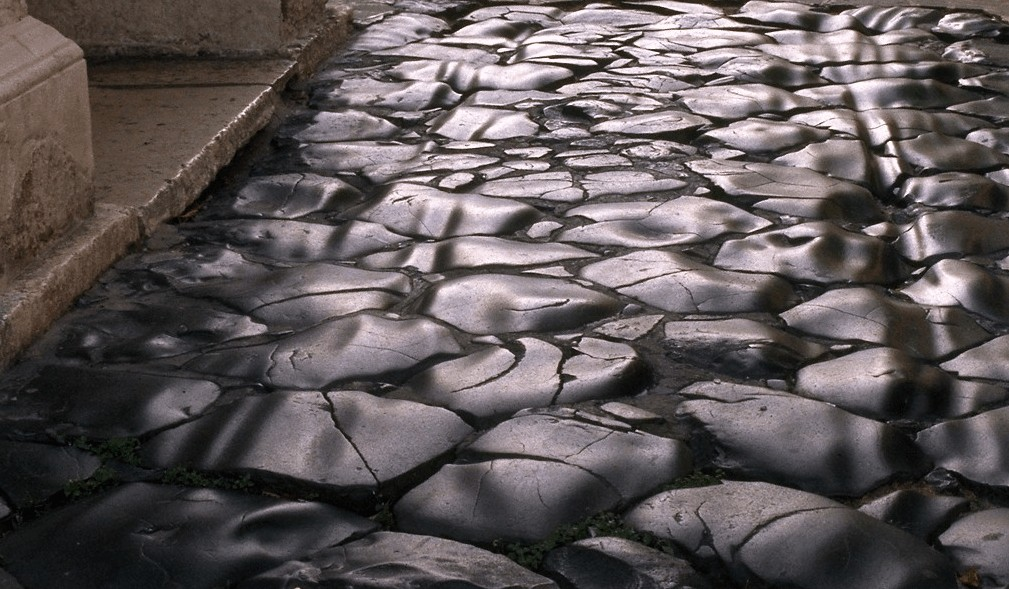
A stretch of the Via Postumia reconstructed under the Arco dei Gavi in Verona.

The ancient Arco dei Gavi still marks the Via Postumia's branch leading to Verona.

Crossing northern Italy from Genoa to Aquileia, it was used as a pilgrim route to the Holy Land. Traveling westward, pilgrims could link up with the Camino de Santiago.
