= Polcevera =

River in Liguria, Italy

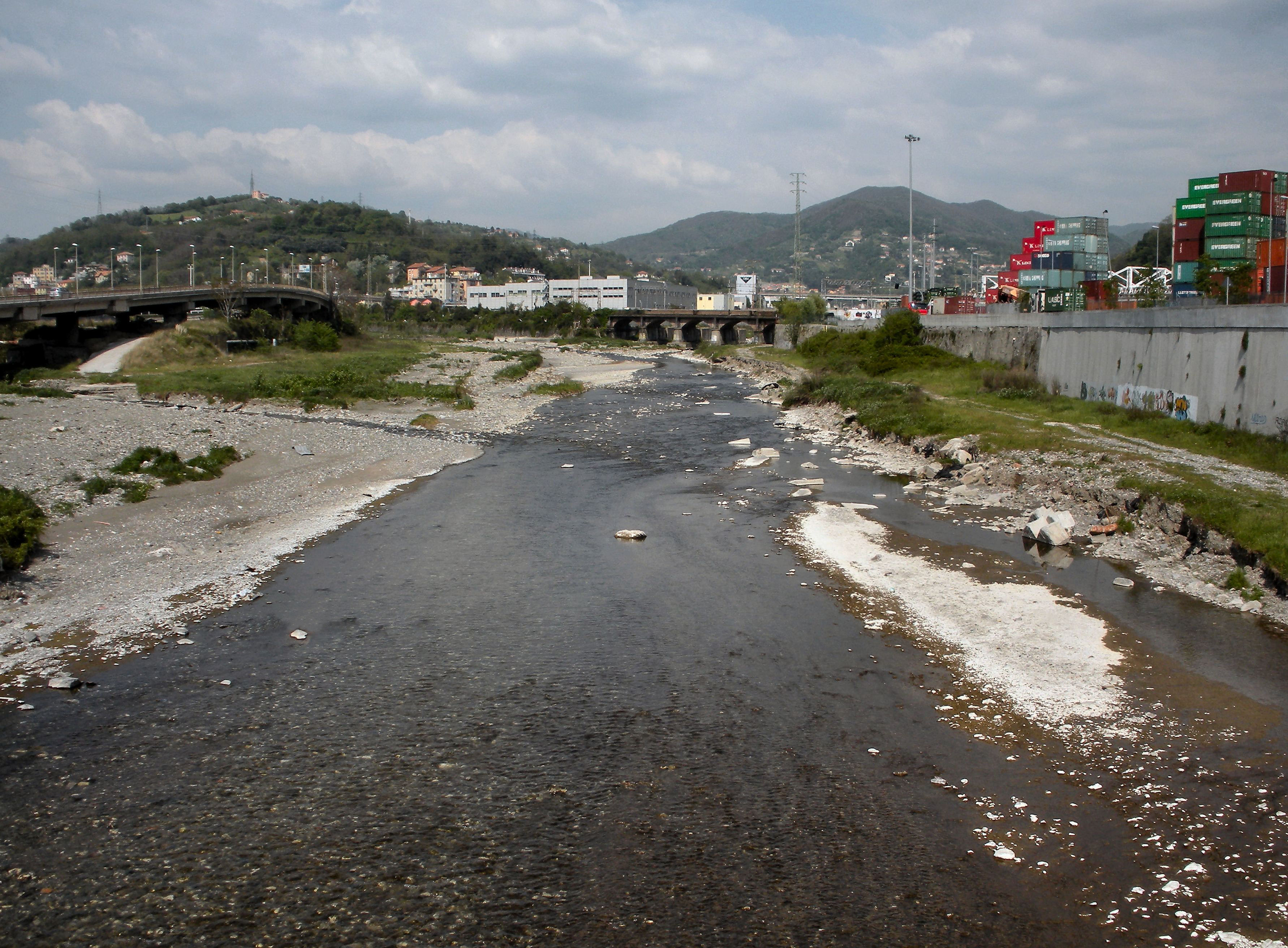
- The Polcevera at its confluence with the Secca

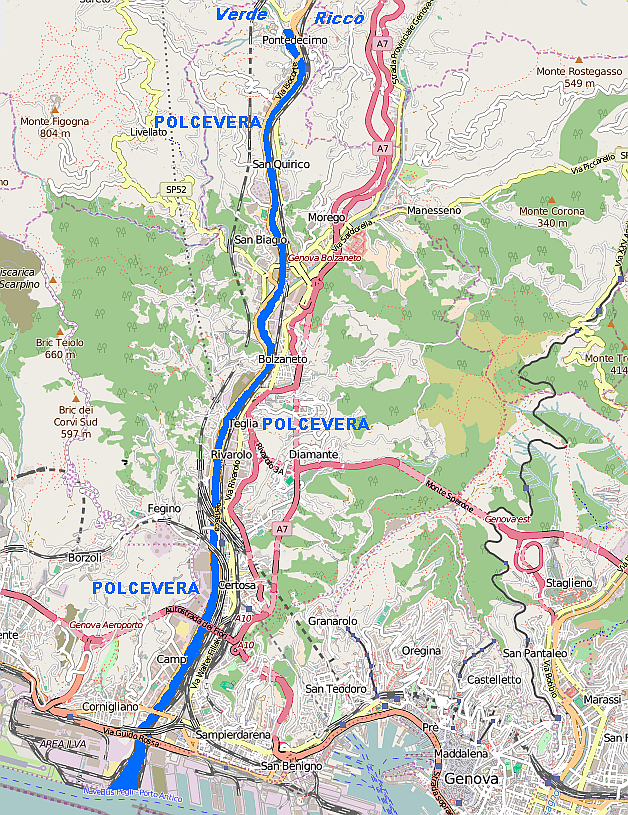

Location
- Country: Italy

Physical characteristics
- Source
  - location: Monte Leco (torr. Verde)
- Mouth: Ligurian Sea
  - location: Genoa
  - coordinates: 44°24′27″N 8°52′30″E
  - elevation: 0 m (0 ft)
- Length: 19 km (12 mi)
- Basin size: 140 km^{2} (54 mi^{2})

The Polcevera (in Ligurian Pûçéivia or Ponçéivia) is a 19-kilometre (12 mi) river in Liguria (Italy).

== Geography ==
The river is named the Polcevera from Pontedecimo, at the confluence of the Torrente Riccò (left-hand) and Torrente Verde (right-hand). Between Pontedecimo and the Ligurian Sea, the Polcevera is 11 kilometres (6.8 mi) long, but its total length including the Torrente Verde is 19 kilometres (12 mi).

From Pontedecimo the Polcevera heads south, and at Bolzaneto it receives the waters of the Torrente Secca, another important left-hand tributary. After being crossed by the Ponte Morandi, a motorway bridge that partially collapsed in August 2018, it ends its course in the Ligurian Sea between Sampierdarena and Cornigliano, two quartieri of Genoa.

The 140-square-kilometre (54 mi^{2}) drainage basin of the Polcevera is totally included in the Province of Genova. Its highest point is Monte Taccone (1,113 m).

=== Main tributaries ===
- Left hand:
  - torrente Riccò,
  - torrente Secca,
  - torrente Geminiano (or Goresina),
  - torrente Torbella.
- Right hand:
  - torrente Verde,
  - torrente Burba,
  - torrente Trasta,
  - torrente Fegino (or Pianego).

== History ==
The Département du Polcevera or Dipartimento della Polcevera of Ligurian Republic took its name at the end of the 18th century from the stream.

== Photo gallery ==
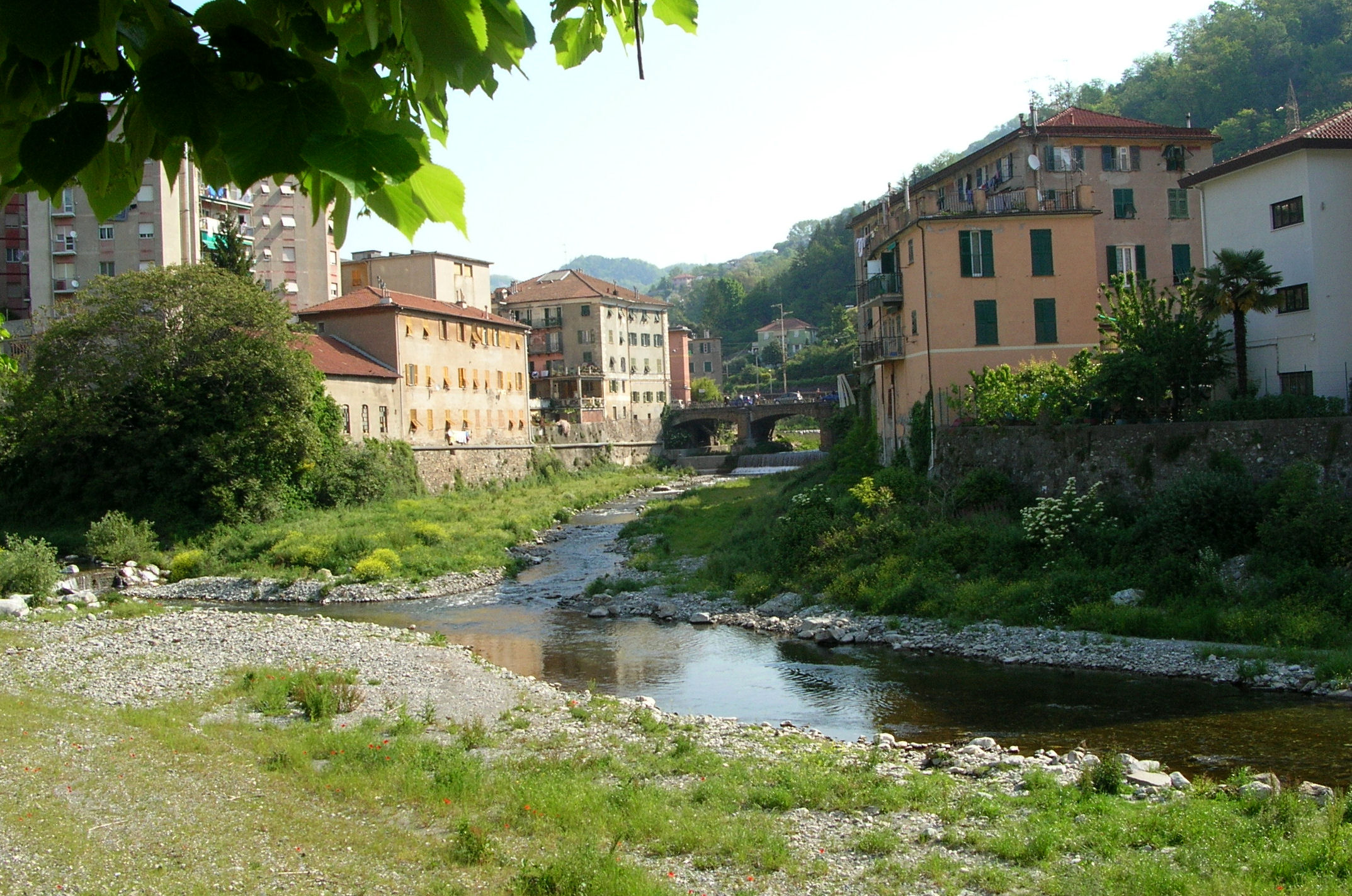
Pontedecimo: the confluence of the Torrente Verde (left) and Riccò (right)

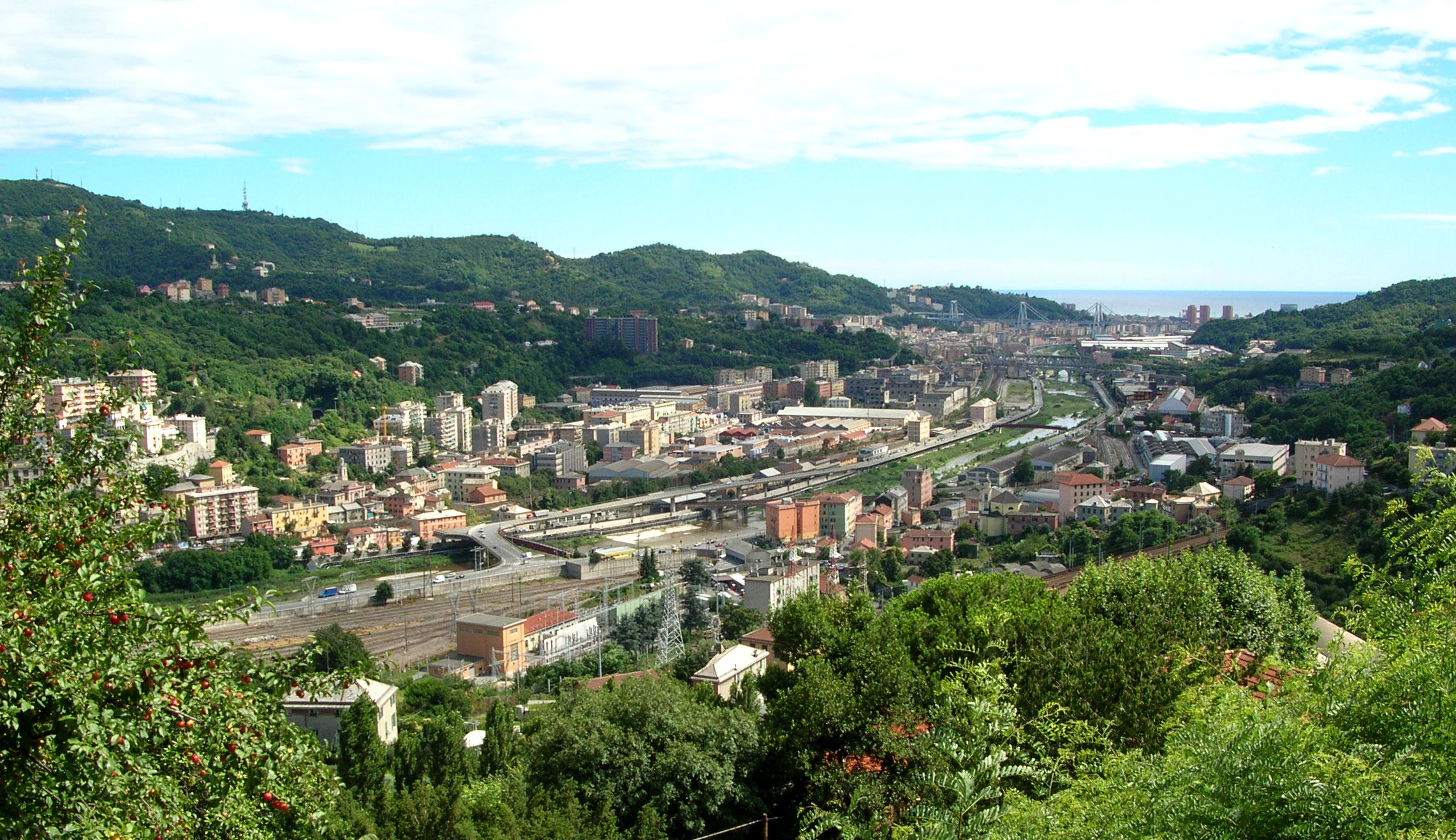
The Polcevera Valley

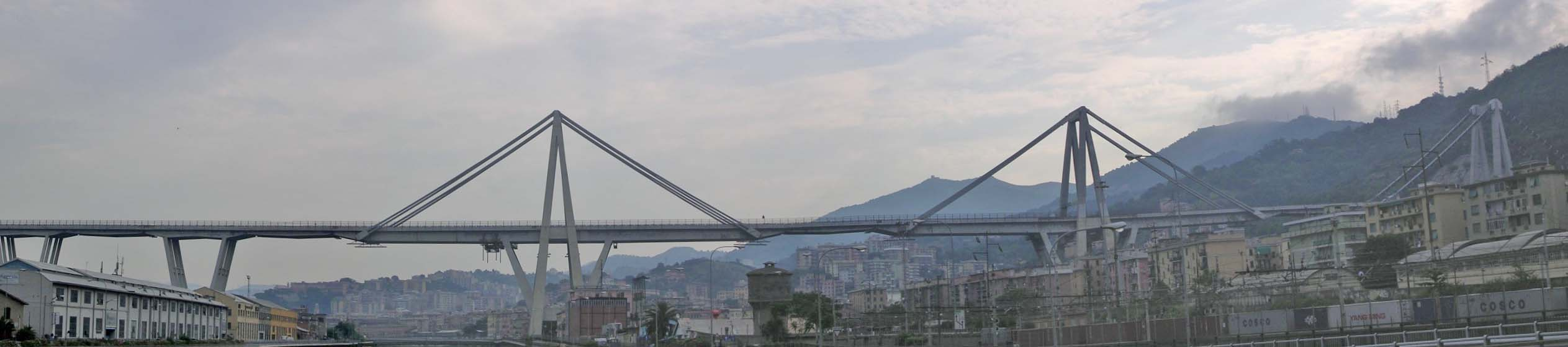
The Viadotto Polcevera, a motorway bridge over the Polcevera that partially collapsed in 2018

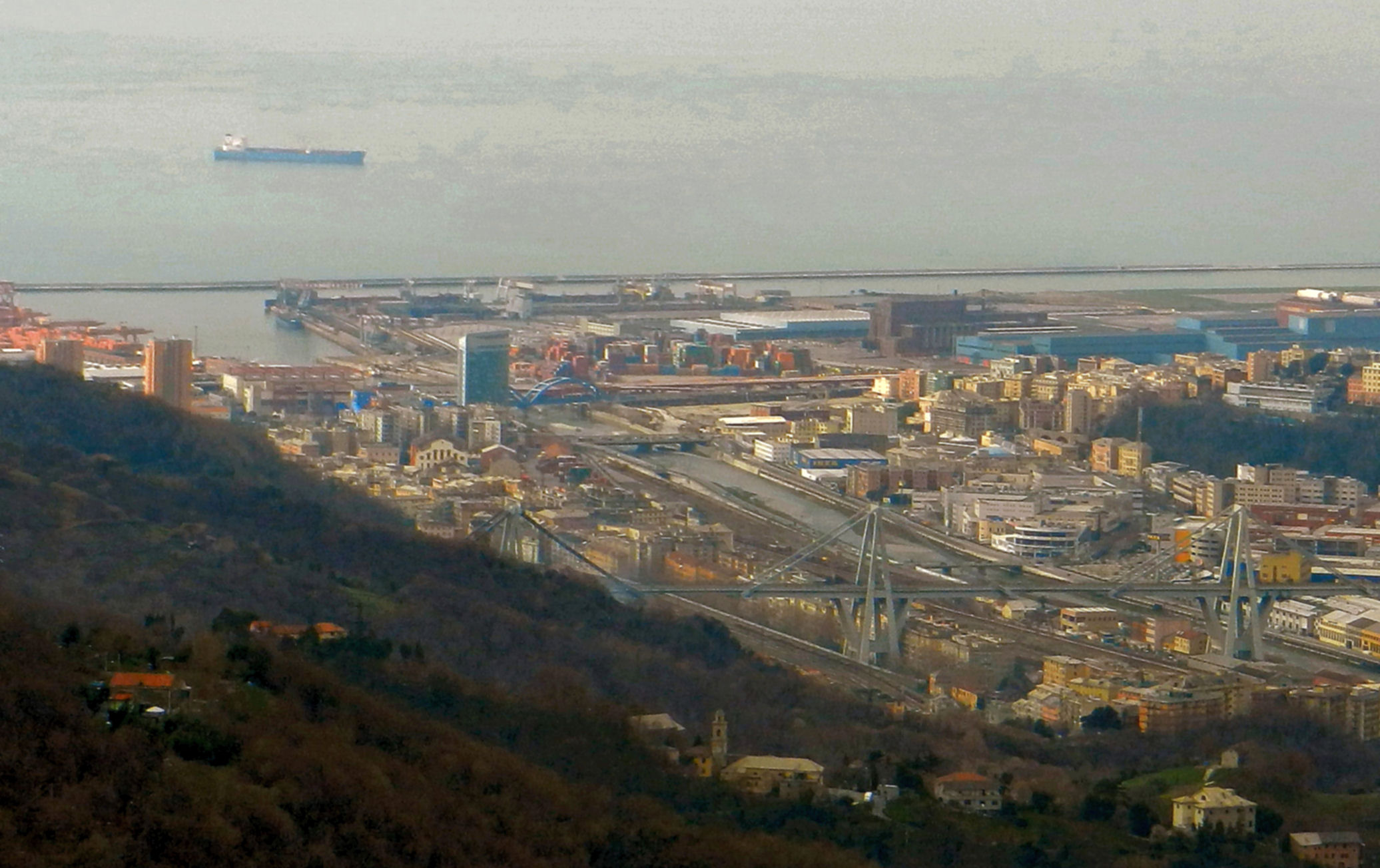
The mouth of the Polcevera; in the background is the Port of Genoa

== See also ==
- Val Polcevera
- List of rivers of Italy
