= Savincates =

Gallic tribe

The Savincates were a Gallic tribe dwelling in the Ubaye valley, around present-day Faucon-de-Barcelonnette in the Alpes Maritimae, during the Iron Age.

== Name ==
They are mentioned as Savincatium on two inscriptions.

The meaning of the ethnonym remains obscure. The toponym Savines has been traditionally compared with Savincates and associated with their chief town, although this has been criticized by Guy Barruol.

== Geography ==
The Savincates dwelled south of the Guil valley, in the Ubaye valley, around the town of Rigomagus (modern Faucon-de-Barcelonnette). The Barrington Atlas locates their territorywest of the Veneni, Soti, and Tyrii, south of the Caturiges, east of the Avantici and Adanates, and north of the Gallitae, Eguiturii, and Nemeturii.

The civitas Rigomagensis, mentioned in 400 AD in the Notitia Galliarum, extended to all the Ubaye valley. In the 8th–9th centuries, it designated a pagus (Rigomagensis) or a vallis (Reumagensis), which corresponded to the middle Ubaye valley.

== History ==
They appear on the Arch of Susa, erected by Cottius in 9–8 BC.
