= Caudellenses =

Ancient Gallic divinities

The Caudellenses were an ancient Gallic group of divinities worshipped in the region of Cadenet (southeastern France).

== Name ==
They are mentioned as Caudellensibus on an inscription.

Their name has been compared to the toponym Gaudelli villa (10th c. AD), in the area of Pertuis–La Bastidonne.

== Attestation ==
The Caudellenses are attested on one inscription from the oppidum of Castellar (Cadenet) dedicated to the goddess Dexiua, the principal deity of Castellar. In this context, Dexiua is associated with the Caudellenses, who are interpreted as collective divinities of a strictly local character as they are not attested elsewhere, and also possibly as mother-goddesses (matres).

Inscription	Translation	Reference
Dexiuae et Caude|lensibus C(aius) Heluius Pri|mus sediliau(otum) s(oluit) l(ibens) m(erito)	Caius Helvius Primus willingly and duly fulfilled his vow to Dexiua and the Caudellenses by offering seats.	ILN Aix, 222 (= CIL XII 1064)

== Tribal name theory ==
Earlier scholarship identified the Caudellenses as the inhabitants of the Cadenet region. Alphonse Sagnier (1884) considered them part of the tribe of the Albici people, but Guy Barruol (1969) argued on historical and philological grounds that the Caudellenses represented collective divinities rather than a people, despite the ethnonym-like suffix in -enses. More recently, Noémie Beck (2013) has returned to the interpretation of the Caudellenses as the inhabitants of Cadenet, suggesting that the inscription refers to seating provided for the local community assembled in the hilltop public space to worship their tutelary goddess Dexiua.
