= Capillati =

Latin name for the Ligurian peoples of the Maritime Alps

The Capillati or Comati (Latin for 'the long-haired'; Ancient Greek: Κομῆται, romanized: Komētai) was a collective name used by Latin authors for the Ligurian, or Celto-Ligurian, peoples of the southern Western Alps. The term is recorded by Pliny the Elder, has a Greek equivalent in Cassius Dio, and is alluded to by the poet Lucan. Most modern scholars regard it as a generic Roman descriptive label rather than the name of a single people. They take it as a label that arose only after the Roman conquest, applied to peoples that Rome did not otherwise recognise as distinct. An alternative view connects the name with a native ethnonym.

== Name ==
In Latin, Capillati means 'the long-haired', from capillus ('hair of the head'). Listing the peoples of the Alps, Pliny the Elder writes that the Inalpine peoples were known by many names, "but most of all as Capillati" (maxime Capillati). He names them again near the Ligurian Sea, where he places "several peoples of the Capillati" (Capillatorum plura genera) among the communities granted Latin rights. In a third passage he derives both the name of the Capillati and that of Gallia Comata ('long-haired Gaul') from the abundance of hair worn by their inhabitants.

In Greek, Cassius Dio renders the name as Κομῆται (Komētai, 'the long-haired'), rendered in Latin as Ligures Comati. The poet Lucan plays on the name, addressing the 'shorn Ligurian' (tonse Ligur) who had once outshone all of Gallia Comata for his flowing hair. Cassius Dio notes that the Ligurians bore the name only while they were free. The cutting of the hair was thus read as a sign of submission to Rome.

== Interpretation ==
Most modern scholars take Capillati as a generic Latin descriptor for the Ligurian, or Celto-Ligurian, peoples of the Maritime Alps rather than the name of a single tribe. Giulia Petracco Sicardi and Rita Caprini describe it as a Latin name for those populations, connected with Pliny's notice of "several peoples" (plura genera) bearing it. They also class it with comparable Latin names for Ligurian peoples, such as the Montani ('mountain-dwellers'). Names of this kind either translate a native ethnonym or mark a group by a trait, here its long hair. Pascal Arnaud treats the term as specifically Roman and later than the conquest, a label for peoples that had until then lacked a recognised identity. In Pliny and Cassius Dio it clearly denotes the population of the Roman province of the Alpes Maritimae, but it also served more broadly for the peoples of the southern French Alps. Arnaud links the term to the name Gallia Comata ('long-haired Gaul'), since Pliny derives both from the wearing of long hair, but stresses that the parallel implies no shared cultural identity between the long-haired Ligurians and the Gauls.

The reading of the Escoyères inscription is disputed. Its two fragments, found in the Queyras (Hautes-Alpes), record a prefect, Albanus son of Bussullus, set over the Capillati, Savincates, Quariates and Bricianii. Guy Barruol took its Capillati to be a collective name for three peoples of the upper Var basin, the Ecdinii, Vesubianii and Veaminii. These were the only peoples of the kingdom of Cottius whose southern location fitted the term, and the four names on the stone then run from south to north. Anne Roth Congès and Stéphane Morabito reached the same conclusion. Pascal Arnaud instead read the inscription's Capillati generically, as the non-Gaulish populations of the French side of the Alps.

A different interpretation connects the name with a native ethnonym. Christian-Joseph Guyonvarc'h suggested that Capillati was the Latin translation of the indigenous name Triulatti, made early in the Roman period. Barruol rejected the identification. The two names are close in form, but in his account they did not denote the same group. Capillati was only ever a collective Roman term. The Triulatti, by contrast, were a single localised people of the southern Alps, named on the Tropaeum Alpium and amounting at most to a fraction of the Capillati.
