= Epanterii =

Ligurian tribe

The Epanterii or Epanterii Montani were a small Ligurian tribe dwelling in the lower Alps, near the Mediterranean coast, during the Iron Age.

== Name ==
They are only mentioned once as Epanterii Montani by Livy (late 1st c. BC). The Montani are also mentioned by Livy as the Ligurians settled in the hinterland of Sauo (modern Savona).

Giulia Petracco Sicardi tentatively derives the ethnonym from the base *epo-, the Gaulish reflex of the Indo-European word for 'horse', attached to a double suffix, -anto- and -erio-. The same base underlies names such as Eporedia (modern Ivrea in Piedmont). The suffix -anto- recurs both in Gaulish names such as Carantos and in the Ligurian ethnonym of the Vediantii. The name Montani is Latin for 'mountain-dwellers', and could be a Latin calque of a pre-Roman name for the Alpine peoples.

== Geography ==
The Epanterii dwelled in the lower Alps, near the Mediterranean coast. The exact location of their territory remains uncertain. The Barrington Atlas locates their territory in the upper Tanarus valley, north of the Intimilii and Ingauni, and east of the Ecdinii and Vesubiani.

== History ==
By the 3rd century BC, the prosperity of thriving Ligurian coastal centres led to recurrent conflicts with mountainous tribes conducting raids on their richer neighbours. During the Second Punic War (218–201 BC), the Carthaginian Mago Barca made an alliance in 205 BC with the coastal Ingauni to secure a foothold on the Italian shore. He helped them in their fight against the Epanterii, who lived above them on the hills and raided their territory, eventually taking Epanterian prisoners of war to Carthage.

[Mago] next landed his fleet on the coast of the Ligurian Alps, hoping to create some unrest in the area. The Ingauni, a Ligurian tribe, were at the time engaged in a war with the Epanterii Montani. The Carthaginian therefore deposited his booty in the Alpine town of Savo and, leaving ten warships at anchor there to protect it, sent the rest to Carthage for the defense of the coast since there was talk of Scipio crossing over. He then struck a treaty with the Ingauni, preferring to have their support, and proceeded to attack the Montani.

— Livy. Ab Urbe Condita Libri, 28:46.
