= Vergunni =

Gallic tribe

The Vergunni were a Gallic tribe dwelling in the valley of the Riou, near the Verdon river, during the Iron Age.

== Name ==
They are mentioned as Vergunni by Pliny (1st c. AD) and on an inscription.

The meaning of the name remains obscure. It could be derived from the Gaulish stem uergo- (cf. Gaul. uergo-bretus 'magistrate', OBret. guerg 'efficax', Welsh gwery 'active', OIr. ferg 'anger').

The village of Vergons, attested as villa Virgonis in 814, is probably named after the Gallic tribe.

== Geography ==
The Vergunni lived in a small piece of land situated in the valley of the Riou, a stream tributary of the Verdon river. The Barrington Atlas locates their territory north of the Suetrii, east of the Sentii, south of the Eguiturii and Nemeturii, and west of the Ecdinii, Vesubiani and Nerusii.

== History ==
They are mentioned by Pliny the Elder as one of the Alpine tribes conquered by Rome in 16–15 BC, and whose name was engraved on the Tropaeum Alpium.
