= Ecdinii =

Gallic tribe

The Ecdinii or Ecdini were a Gallic tribe dwelling in the valley of the Tinée (Alpes-Maritimes) during the Iron Age.

== Name ==
They are mentioned as Ecdini by Pliny (1st c. AD), and as Ecdiniorum on the Arc of Susa.

The meaning of the ethnonym remains obscure. If Celtic, Ecdinii is possibly formed with the prefix ec(s)- ('out of, without') attached to -dīn(i)- ('shelter, protection'). Xavier Delamarre has thus proposed to translate *Ec(s)-dīni-oi as the 'Homeless'. If this interpretation is correct, the name was probably an exonym given by a neighbouring tribe. Guy Barruol suggested that the name Tinius might be related.

== Geography ==
The Ecdinii lived in the valley of the Tinée, a tributary of the Var river. The Barrington Atlas locates their territory west of the Vesubiani and Tyrii, east of the Nemeturii, north of the Nerusii and Vediantii, and south of the Savincates and Caturiges. According to A. L. F. Rivet, "there appear to have been no significant settlements in the lands of the Ecdinii and the Vesubiani, so that they must have been controlled by Cemenelum when they had been detached from the Cottian kingdom."

Along with the Vesubiani and Veaminii, they were part of the Capillati.

== History ==
They are mentioned by Pliny the Elder as one of the Alpine tribes conquered by Rome in 16–15 BC, and whose name was engraved on the Tropaeum Alpium. They also appear on the Arch of Susa, erected by Cottius in 9–8 BC.
