= Eguiturii =

Celto-Ligurian tribe

The Eguiturii or Eguituri were a Ligurian tribe living in the upper Verdon valley, in the Alpes Maritimae, during the Iron Age.

== Name ==
They are mentioned as Eguituri by Pliny (1st c. AD).

The meaning of the ethnonym Eguituri(i) remains unclear. The original nominative form was probably Eguiturii. The prefix egui- may be a variant of equi-, which can be translated as 'horse', with an archaic preservation of labio-velar -kʷ- (in contrast to Gaulish epos). The suffix -turi(i) may be the same as the one found in the ethnonyms Viturii (a people of the Genoa region), Nemeturii (from the upper Verdon or Var valley) and Turi (posited to reflect an original Es-turi).

== Geography ==
The Eguiturii probably dwelled in the upper Verdon valley. The Barrington Atlas locates their territory east of the Adanates, Gallitae and Bodiontici, west of the Nemeturii, north of the Sentii and Vergunni, and south of the Savincates and Caturiges.

== History ==
They are mentioned by Pliny the Elder as one of the Alpine tribes conquered by Rome in 16–15 BC, and whose name was engraved on the Tropaeum Alpium.
