= Dexiva =

Ancient Celtic goddess

Dexiva (or Dexiua) was an ancient local Celtic goddess, known from inscriptions found at Castellar (modern Cadenet, southeastern France), within the territory of the Dexivates.

== Name ==
She is attested as Dexiua or Dexsiua on inscriptions dated to the 1st–2nd centuries AD.

The Gaulish theonym Dexiua derives from the stem dexsiu(o)- ('on the right, in the south, favourable'). It could translated as 'she who is on the right / in the south', whence 'the Favourable'. The tribal name Dexivates (in the region of Cadenet) could be interpreted as 'those of the goddess Dexiva'.

Her name could suggest that she was a deity of (good) fortune, or else connected to a fecundity function which would be equivalent to the Roman cult of Bona Dea.

== Cult ==
Dexiva appears to have been the principal deity of the oppidum of Castellar (Cadenet), since her name appears on four inscriptions from the site. The sanctuary of Dexiva was probably frequented by the local inhabitants between the 1st century BC and the end of the 3rd century AD.

Dexiva is venerated once with the Roman god Mars in relation to the gift of axes, in an inscription dated to the 3rd century AD. Some scholars have proposed to see the couple as the protectors of the local community, although others contend that the association appears to be indirect and rather prompted by the needs of the dedicant.

d(onum) d(at) Quartus Mar(ti) securem Dexsive Quartus securem v(otum) s(olvit) l(ibens) m(erito)
[Quartus offers an axe to Mars as a gift, Quartus offers an axe to Dexsiva paying his vow willingly and deservedly]

— ILN III, 221 = CAG 84.2

Dexiva is also associated once alongside the Caudellenses, probably a collective designation for a group local deities.

Dexivae et Caudellensibus C(aius) Helvius Primus sedilia v(otum) s(olvit) l(ibens) m(erito)
[Gaius Helvius Primus paid his vow willingly and deservedly to Dexiva and to the Caudellenses in offering seats or benches]

— ILN III, 222 = CAG 84.2
