= Oratelli =

Ligurian tribe

The Oratelli were a Ligurian tribe living in the Alpes Maritimae during the Iron Age.

== Name ==
They are mentioned as Oratelli by Pliny (1st c. AD).

== Geography ==
The list of tribes on the Tropaeum Alpium follows no discernible topographic order, making it impossible to determine even an approximate location for the Oratelli. Nino Lamboglia has compared the ethnonym to the toponym Oria, which in the 6th century designated a small settlement (mansum) near Peille in the middle Paillon valley. Guy Barruol, however, notes that this village lies close to Cimiez, capital of the Vediantii, and that it gained importance only in early Middle Ages as a refuge for coastal populations during Saracen incursions. He also considers the linguistic connection between Oratelli and Oria to be highly uncertain.

== History ==
They are mentioned by Pliny the Elder as one of the Alpine tribes conquered by Rome in 16–15 BC, and whose name was engraved on the Tropaeum Alpium.
