= Dexivates =

Gallic tribe

The Dexivates (Gaulish: Dexiuates) were a small Gallic tribe dwelling in the southern part of modern Vaucluse, near the present-day village of Cadenet, during the Iron Age and the Roman period.

== Name ==
The tribe is attested as Dexivatium (var. dexuia-) by Pliny in the 1st century AD.

The Gaulish ethnonym Dexiuates derives from the stem deksiu(o)- ('on the right, in the south, favourable'). A local goddess is also attested as Dexiua (Dea) or Dexsiua. The name Dexivates thus either means 'those who live in the south' (i.e. 'the Southerners'), or 'those of the goddess Dexiua' (i.e. 'Worshippers of Dexiua'), whose name could be translated as 'she who is on the right / in the south', whence 'the Favourable'.

== Geography ==
The territory of the Dexivates was located in the Durance valley, south of the Luberon massif, in what is today known as the Pays d'Aigues. The Barrington Atlas locates their territory north of the Salyes and Anatilii, east of the Cavares, south of the Vocontii and Albici, and west of the Reii. According to historian Guy Barruol, they were part of the Saluvian confederation.

Beyond are the canals leading out of the Rhone, famous as the work of Gaius Marius whose distinguished name they bear, Lake Mastromela and the town of Maritima of the Avatici, and above are the Stony Plains, where tradition says that Hercules fought battles, the district of the Anatilii, and inland those of the Dexivates and Cavares.

— Pliny 1938. Naturalis Historia, 3.34.

Built in the 3rd–2nd century BC, the oppidum of Castellar (modern Cadenet) was probably the chief town of the Dexivates. The site was occupied until at least the 3rd century AD. Another protohistorical oppidum was located in the castle of Cadenet, built in the Middle Ages on a former Gallic site. The countryside was densely populated, with 38 rural sites identified from the Roman period.

== Culture ==
The Dexivates were influenced by Greek culture, as attested by a series of Gallo-Greek inscriptions referring to personal names, and the discovery of a large hoard of Massaliote coins at Castellar dated from the 3rd–2nd centuries BC.

== Religion ==
During the Roman period, the former oppidum of Castellar saw the creation of a shrine devoted to the goddess Dexiua, a local deity only found in the region and with a clear ethnic dimension.

Two inscriptions dedicated to the native god Lanovalus were found near a mountain stream called Laval (≈ Lavar), whose name is related to the deity. Lanovalus has been interpreted as a healing god in the context of a water-related cult. His name literally means 'Full Prince' (i.e. 'All-Powerful'), stemming from the Gaulish root lano- ('full') attached to the word ualos ('ruler, prince'). An altar dedicated to Iuppiter Optimus Maximus is also known from the castle of Cadenet.

Several representations of a human foot engraved on stelae are known from Castellar and its vicinity. Two conflicting interpretations have been proposed: a votive function (e.g. a mark let by pilgrims, or the foot of a divinity), or, more likely, a funerary function, by comparing with similar sites from southern Gaul.
