= Sebaginni =

Gallic tribe

The Sebaginni were a Gallic tribe dwelling in the middle Durance valley during the Iron Age.

== Name ==
They are mentioned as Sebaginnos (var. -gninos, Sabagnanos) by Cicero (early 1st c. BC).

The meaning of the name remains obscure. The first element, seba-, can be compared with the personal names Seboθθu, Sebosus, Sebosiana, and Sebbaudus. The second component, -ginn-, may be Celtic, too.

== Geography ==
The Sebaginni lived in the middle valley of the Durance river, north of present-day Sisteron (Segustero). The Barrington Atlas locates their territory south of the Avantici, east of the Vocontii, north of the Sogiontii, and west of the Edenates and Gallitae.

They were probably part of the Vocontian confederation.
