= Nemeturii =

Gallic tribe

The Nemeturii or Nemeturi were a Gallic tribe dwelling in the Alpes Maritimae during the Iron Age.

== Name ==
They are mentioned as Nemeturicae by Columella (1st c. AD), and as Nemoturica and Nematuri (var. nemet-) by Pliny (1st c. AD).

The ethnic name Nemeturii is a latinized form of Gaulish *Nemeturioi. It seems to derive from the stem nemeto-, meaning 'sacred place, sanctuary'. Patrizia de Bernardo Stempel has proposed to interpret the name as Nemet-urii ('the inhabitants of sacred places'). Alternatively, it may be built on a suffix -turii, also found in the ethnonyms Viturii (a people of the Genoa region), Eguiturii (upper Verdon valley) and Turi (posited to reflect an original Es-turi).

== Geography ==
The Nemeturii dwelled in the upper Verdon or Var valley. The Barrington Atlas locates their territory east of the Eguiturii, west of the Ecdinii, north of the Vergunni and Nerusii, and south of the Savincates and Caturiges.

== History ==
They are mentioned by Pliny the Elder as one of the Alpine tribes conquered by Rome in 16–15 BC, and whose name was engraved on the Tropaeum Alpium.
