= Nemaloni =

Gallic tribe

The Nemaloni were a Gallic tribe dwelling in the middle valley of Durance river during the Iron Age.

== Name ==
They are mentioned as Nemaloni by Pliny (1st c. AD) and on an inscription.

== Geography ==
The Nemaloni lived in the middle valley of Durance river, in the southern part of the French Alps.

== History ==
They are mentioned by Pliny the Elder as one of the Alpine tribes conquered by Rome in 16–15 BC, and whose name was engraved on the Tropaeum Alpium.
