= Veaminii =

Ligurian tribe

The Veaminii or Veamini were a Ligurian tribe living in the Alpes Maritimae during the Iron Age.

== Name ==
They are mentioned as Veamini by Pliny (1st c. AD), and as civitas Veaminiorum of the Arch of Susa.

In the Lusitanian inscription of Lamas de Moledo, reference is made to the Veamini cori ('the Veaminian peoples'). The second part could be interpreted as Celtic corio- ('troop, army').

== Geography ==
Their relative position on the Arch of Susa and the Tropaeum Alpium does not offer any secure indication of their exact geographical location. Nino Lamboglia, observing that the Veaminii are listed immediately after the Ecdinii on the Arch of Susa and after the Vesubiani on the Tropaeum Alpium, proposed situating their territory in the lower Tinée valley and compared the name to the Vionène river. Guy Barruol considers this plausible but highly hypothetical, noting that the tribe could just as well have lived in the upper Var, the upper Verdon, or even on the Italian side of the Maritime Alps. He further remarks that all known attestations of the personal names Veaminius or Veamonius, which could be indicators of origin, come exclusively from the Italian side of the mountain range: from Acqui (P. Veaminius L.), Pagno (Veaminius Auci), Borgo San Dalmazzo (Vibius Veamonius Iemmi fil. Gallus), and Saorge (Veamonae).

Along with the Ecdinii and Vesubiani, they were part of the Capillati.

== History ==
They are mentioned on the Arch of Susa, erected by Cottius in 9–8 BC, and by Pliny the Elder as one of the Alpine tribes conquered by Rome in 16–15 BC, and whose name was engraved on the Tropaeum Alpium.
