= Arcole =

- Comune
- Comune di Arcole
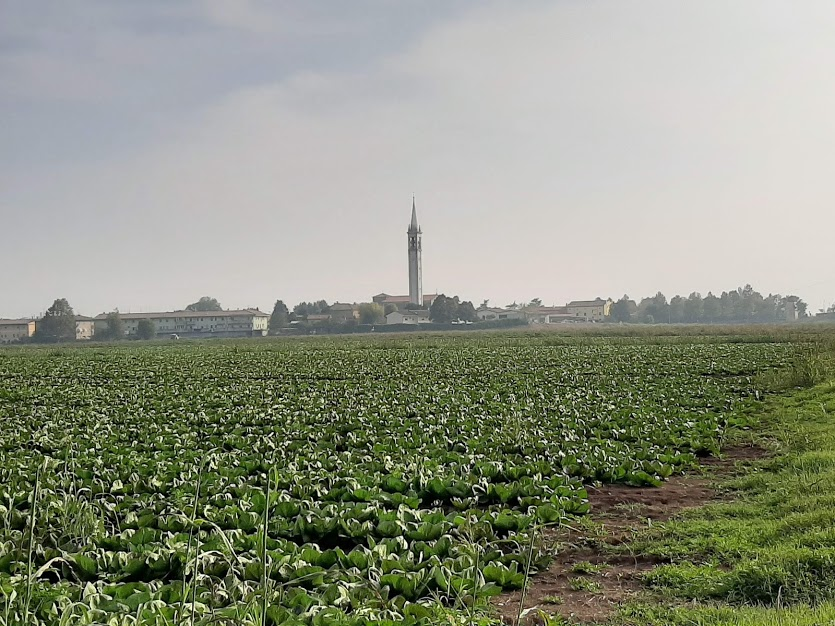

- Location within Italy Location within Veneto
- Coordinates: 45°21′30″N 11°17′10″E
- Country: Italy
- Region: Veneto
- Province: Verona (VR)
- Frazioni: Gazzolo, Volpino

Area
  - Total: 18.81 km^{2} (7.26 sq mi)
- Elevation: 27 m (89 ft)

Population (31 December 2020)
  - Total: 6,286
  - Density: 334.2/km^{2} (865.5/sq mi)
- Demonym: Arcolesi
- Time zone: UTC+1 (CET)
  - Summer (DST): UTC+2 (CEST)
- Postal code: 37040
- Dialing code: 045
- ISTAT code: 023004
- Patron saint: San Giorgio
- Saint day: 23 April
- Website: Official website

Arcole (pronounced [ˈarkole]), historically also known as Arcola, is a comune with 5,274 inhabitants in the province of Verona. It is known as the site of the Battle of the Bridge of Arcole.

== History ==
Between 15 and 17 November 1796, the Battle of Arcole took place. Napoleon Bonaparte, recently appointed commander of the French Army of Italy, led a rapid and conclusive attack through Italy as part of the French Revolutionary Wars. In April and May of that year, he had defeated the Piedmont army and driven the Austrian army out of almost all of Northern Italy. In November, Napoleon joined battle with József Alvinczi near the junction of the Adige and Alpone rivers. Despite lacking basic equipment and food, the French army went on the offensive. On 14 November, they crossed the Adige. All that remained between the two armies now was the Alpone. On 15–16 November, the French made repeated attempts to cross the bridge at Arcole. These initial assaults were beaten back by Austrian firepower. By 17 November, French flanking moves convinced Alvinczi that he was threatened with encirclement and he ordered a tactical withdrawal. The following year Napoleon went on to crush the Austrians at Rivoli, forcing them to sign the Peace of Campo Formio later that year.

== Twin towns ==
Arcole is twinned with:

- Cadenet, France
