= Vediantii =

Celto-Ligurian tribe

The Vediantii were a Celto-Ligurian tribe dwelling on the Mediterranean coast, near present-day Nice, during the Iron Age and the Roman period.

== Name ==
They are mentioned as Ou̓ediantíōn (Οὐεδιαντίων) by Ptolemy (2nd c. AD), and an oppidum Vediantiorum civitatis is documented by Pliny (1st c. AD).

The name is formed with the suffix -antio-, as in Epanterii, attached to a base *ued-, which has parallels in Celtic. It has been interpreted as 'pertaining to the praying ones' (from wed- 'to pray'), as the 'Leaders' (from *wedʰ-yā 'guidance, leadership'), or else as the 'Sages' (from *weid-yā 'knowledge, doctrine').

== Geography ==
The Vediantii dwelled on the Mediterranean coast, between the Var river and the Mont Agel, around the Massaliote colony of Nikaea (modern Nice). The Barrington Atlas locates their territory east of the Deciates and Nerusii, west of the Intimilii, and south of the Vesubiani.

Their chief town was the oppidum Vediantiorum, known as Cemenelum by the 2nd century AD. Corresponding to modern Cimiez, now a neighbourhood of Nice, the settlement controlled an important trading route from the Mediterranean coast towards the hinterland and the Alps. The acropolis stood about two kilometres inland, north of the Massaliote port of Nice, at the starting point of routes leading into the Alpine hinterland, in a position from which its inhabitants could defend themselves against pirates and mountain raiders. After the subjugation of the Ligurian tribes in 14 BC, Cemenelum became the centre of the local Roman military government, then served as the capital of the new Roman province from its creation by Nero in 63 AD.

The territory contained several ports, reflecting both land-based and maritime activity. In addition to Nice, a Massaliote trading post, local landing places recorded in the Itinerarium maritimum Antonini included Anao, Olivula and Avisio. Monaco (Portus Herculis Monoeci), another Massaliote port, also lay within their territory. Epigraphy records the name of a Gallo-Roman settlement in the hinterland, the vicus Cuntinus (modern Contes), whose inhabitants honoured a protective deity, Segomo Cuntinus. Another small settlement, vicus Navelis in the pagus Licirrus, is attested but cannot be precisely located, though it lay within the territory of the civitas of Cemenelum.

== History ==
Contrary to other tribes of the region, the Vediantii were probably allied or tributary to Massalia and the Roman Republic by the mid-2nd century BC. In 154 BC, when the Romans intervened on behalf of Massalia to free the Greek colonies of Nikaea and Antipolis (Antibes) from Ligurian groups obstructing land and sea communications, they subdued the Oxybii and Deciates west of the Var, but not the Vediantii. The inhabitants of Cemenelum, the indigenous capital of the Vediantii, likely maintained long-standing relations of good neighbourship with the Greek merchants at Nikaea, and nothing suggests that they were subdued together with the other coastal Ligurian tribes. Their traditional loyalty to Rome later led to the choice of Cemenelum to become the capital of the Alpes Maritimae after its foundation in 63 AD.

The Vediantii are not mentioned in the Trophy of the Alps, suggesting that they were either already subjugated by or allied to Rome at the time of the conquest of the region in 14 BC.

== Religion ==
Three inscriptions dated to the 1st–2nd centuries AD and dedicated to the Matres Vediantiae, eponymous deities of the country and protectresses of its inhabitants, were found near Tourrette-Levens and Cimiez.

Matronis Vediantiabus P(ublius) Enistalius P(ublii) f(ilius) Cl(audia tribu) Paternus Cemenelensis optio ad ordine(m) (centurionis) leg(ionis) XXII Primigeniae Piae Fidelis l(ibens) m(erito)
[To the Matronae Vediantiae, Publius Enistalius Paternus, son of Publius, of the Claudia tribe, from Cemenelum, optio promoted to centurion in the legion XXII Primigenia Pia Fidelis, willingly and deservedly (offered this monument)]

— Corpus Inscriptionum Latinarum (CIL) 5:07872.
