= Joseph Sec =

Joseph Sec (1715, Cadenet, Vaucluse - 1794) was a bourgeois, a Jacobin and a grey penitent from Aix-en-Provence. He was a master carpenter and wood merchant.

== Joseph-Sec Mausoleum ==
In 1792, a cenotaph was completed close to the Saint-Jacques hospital, and it was made a monument historique in 1969. Reminiscent of buildings from the French Revolution, it is crowned by the figure of Revolutionary Justice, which stands above the representation of Moses delivering the Law. Statuary within the garden represent Old Testament figures such as Noah (with both an ark and bunches of grapes), Aaron wearing the priestly breastplate, David with the head of Goliath, and Jael slaying Sisera. In the typical baroque style, these statuary figures feature detailed and ample robes and theatrical movements. Other reliefs thematically echo the New Testament, Freemasonry, and revolutionary ideals. These statues, commissioned by Joseph Sec before his death were probably executed by Barthélémy-François Chardigny, who may have also done some of the bas-reliefs. This monument is very rare for the periode of "vandalisme" during the French revolution, which featured the destruction of religious symbols and monuments. Joseph Sec assumed the role of removing the statuary figures from the nearby Sainte-Sauveur Cathedral to preserve them.

The facade of the Mausoleum features two prominent figures, Moses (with two horns and holding the ten commandments), and the allegory of justice (holding a balance). The facade presents the revolutionary ideal of the rights of man presiding over divine law. The two adjacent allegorical characters, the allegory of the freedom from slavery, and the allegory of Europe pull together the facade to reveal the three ideals of France today: liberty, fraternity, and equality.

The mausoleum can be found at 8, avenue Pasteur, in Aix-en-Provence.

== Statues on the Mausoleum ==
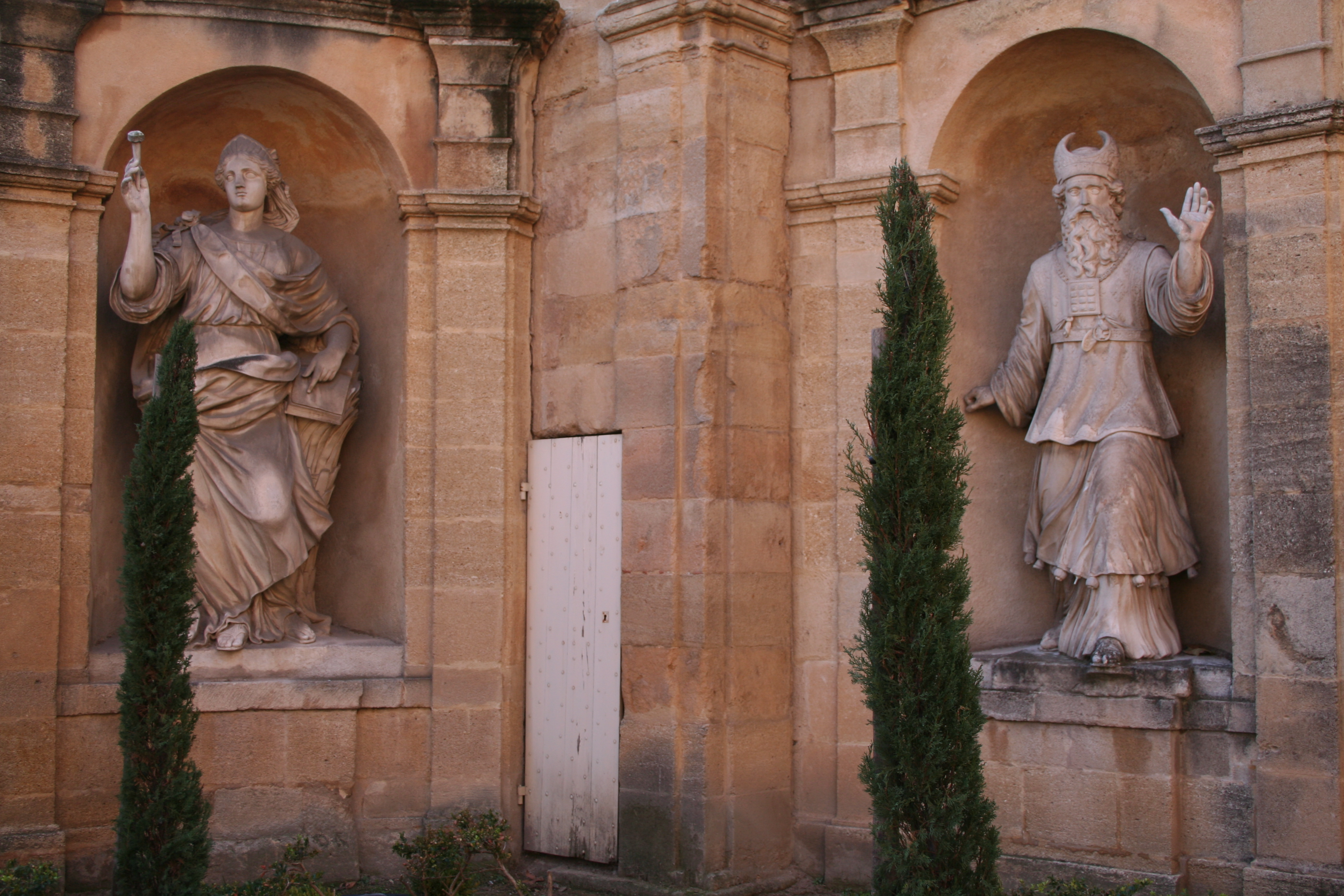

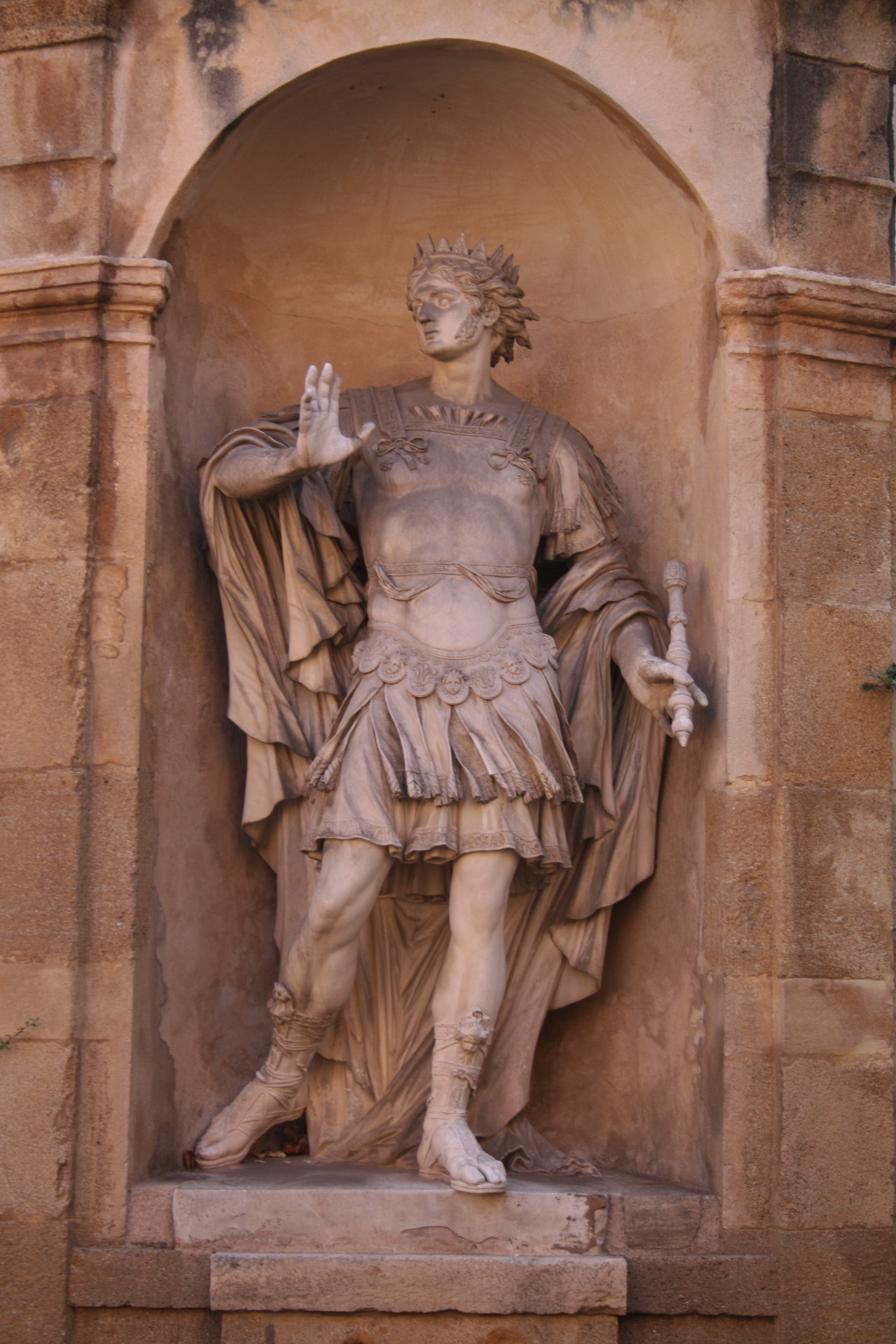

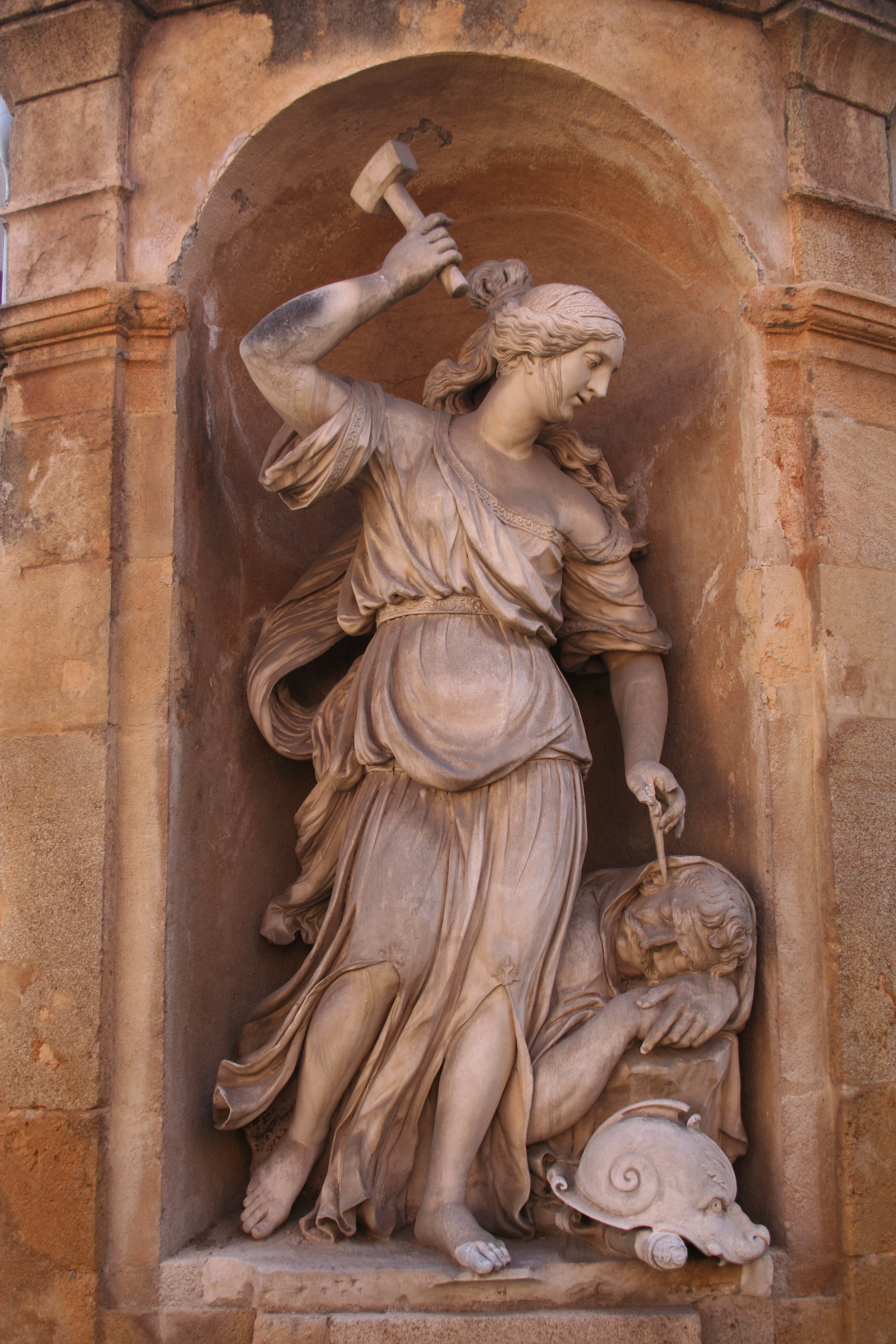

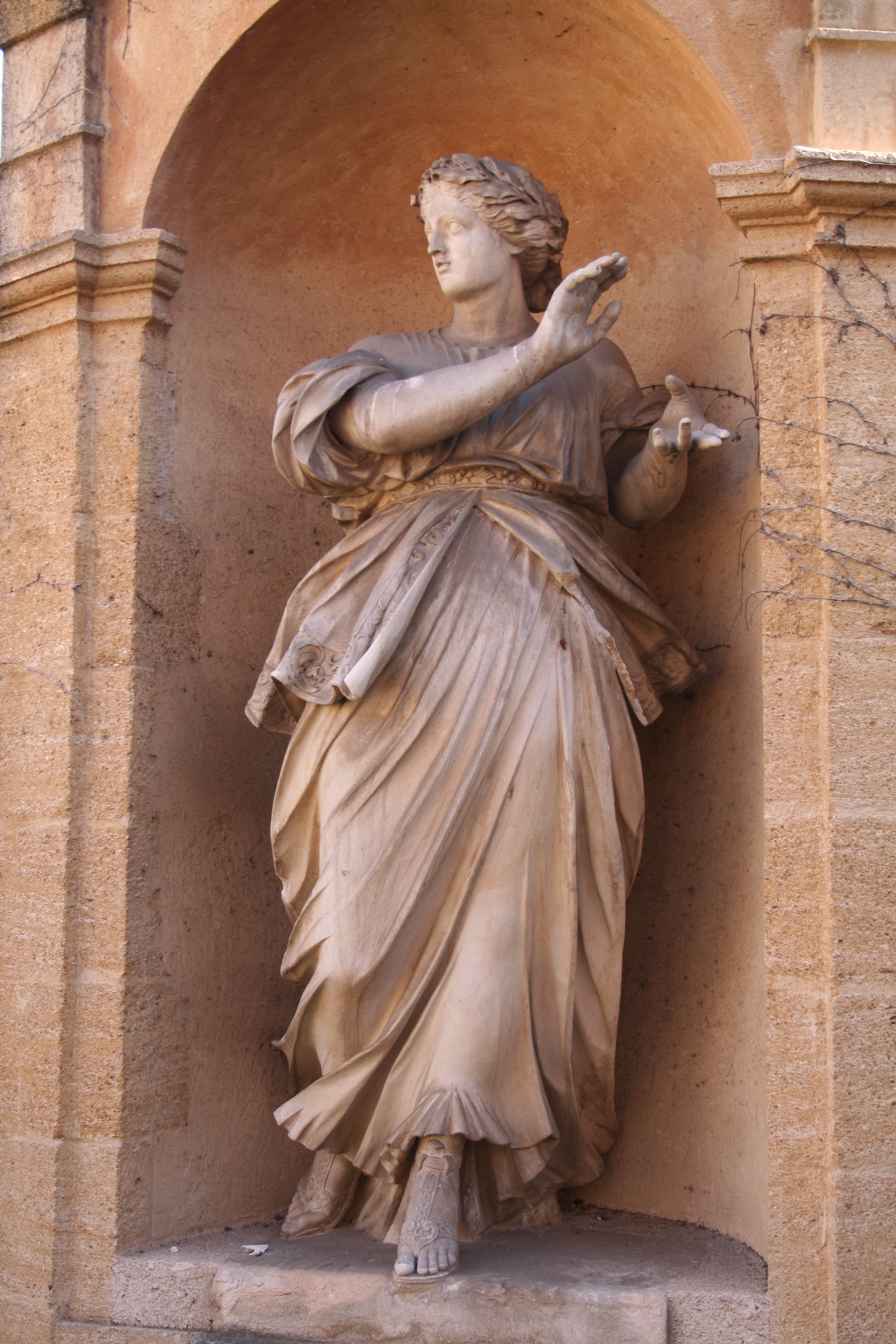

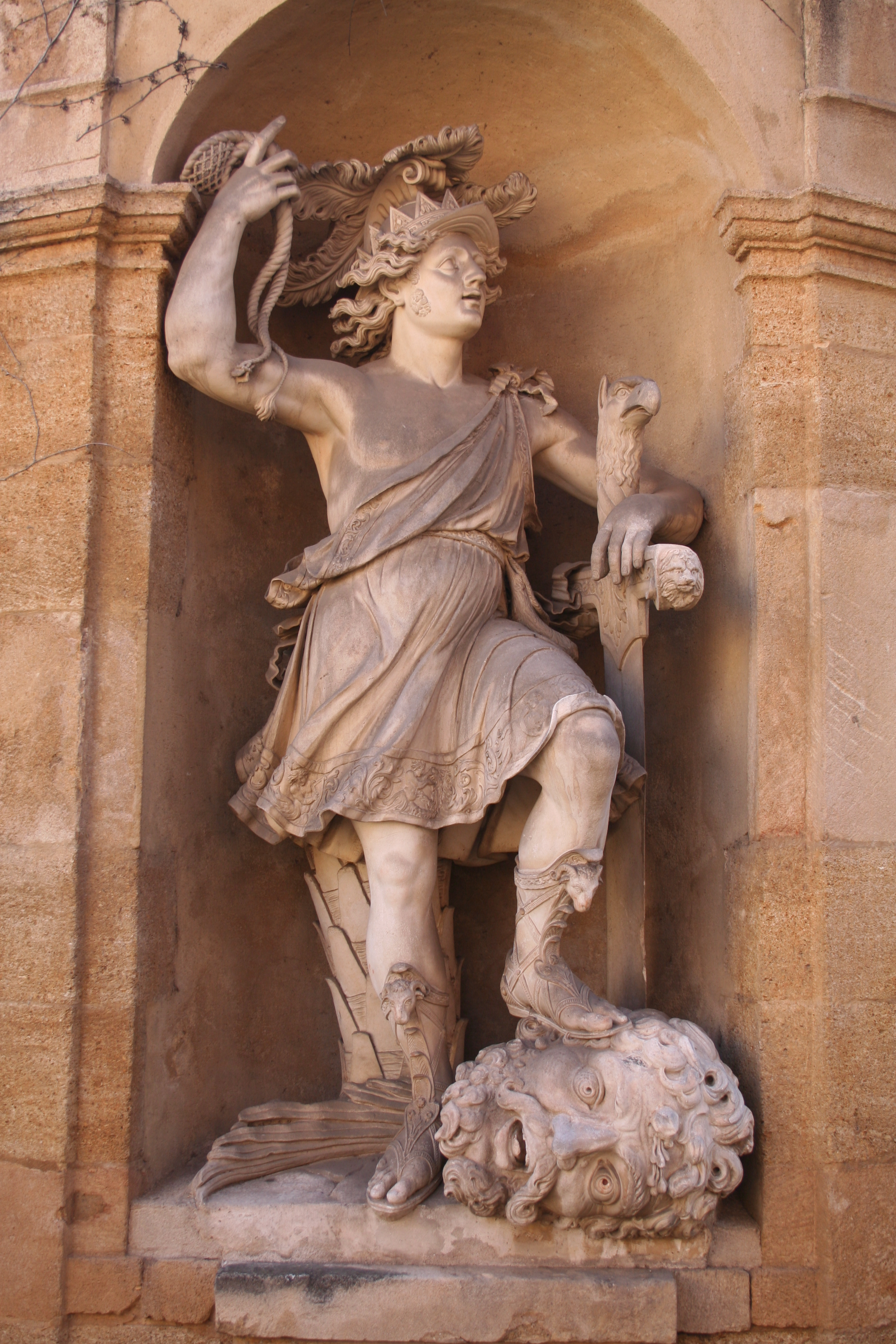

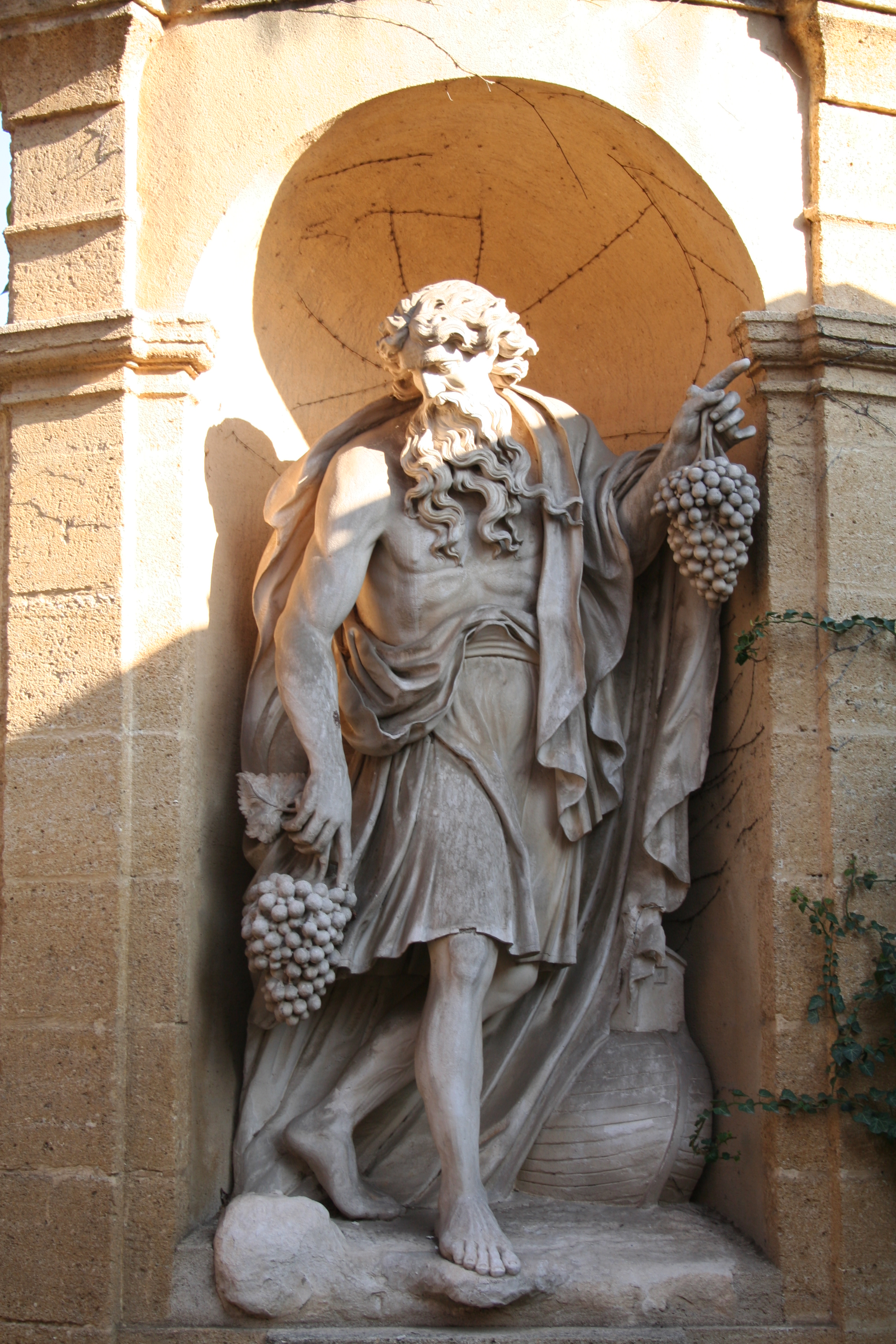

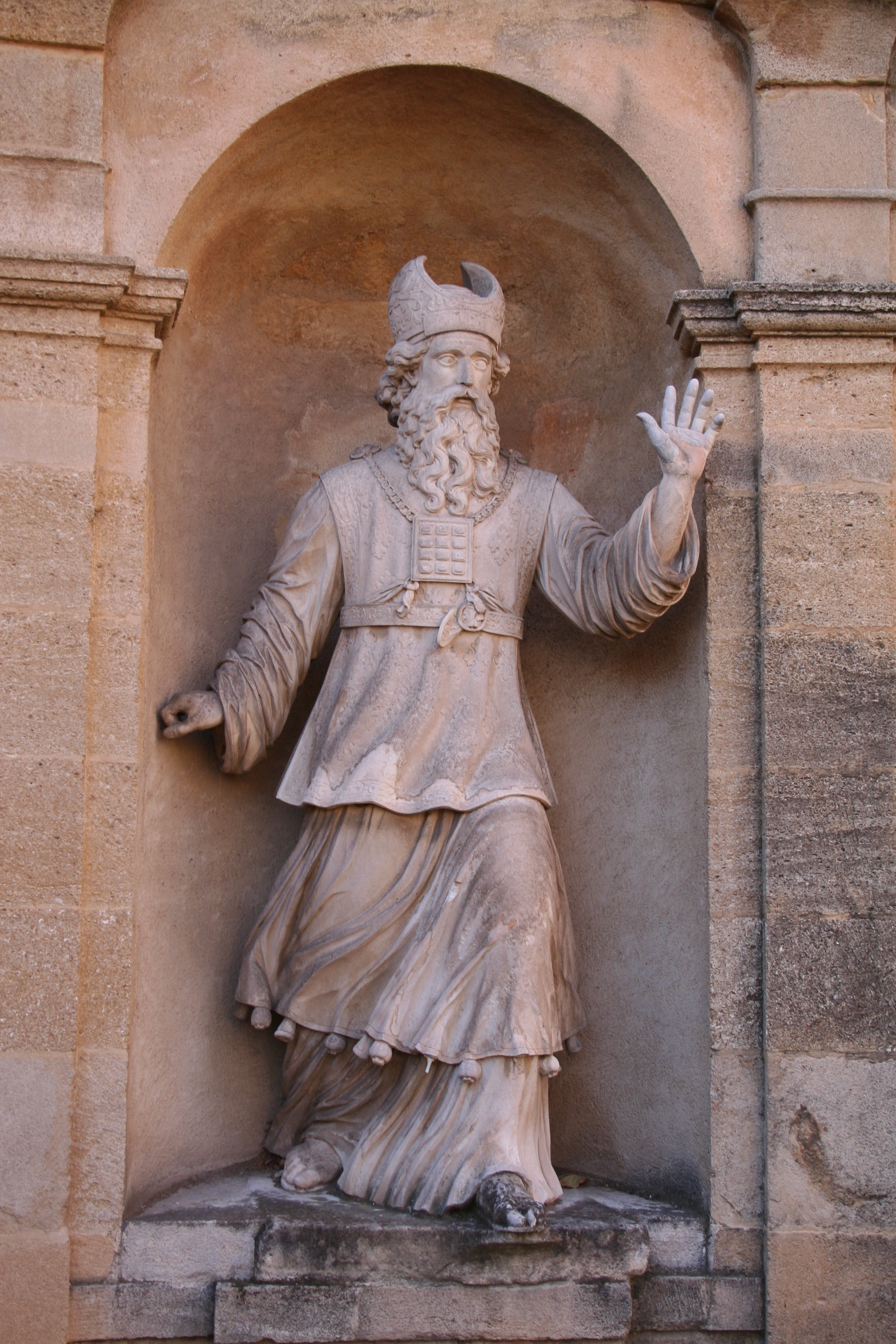

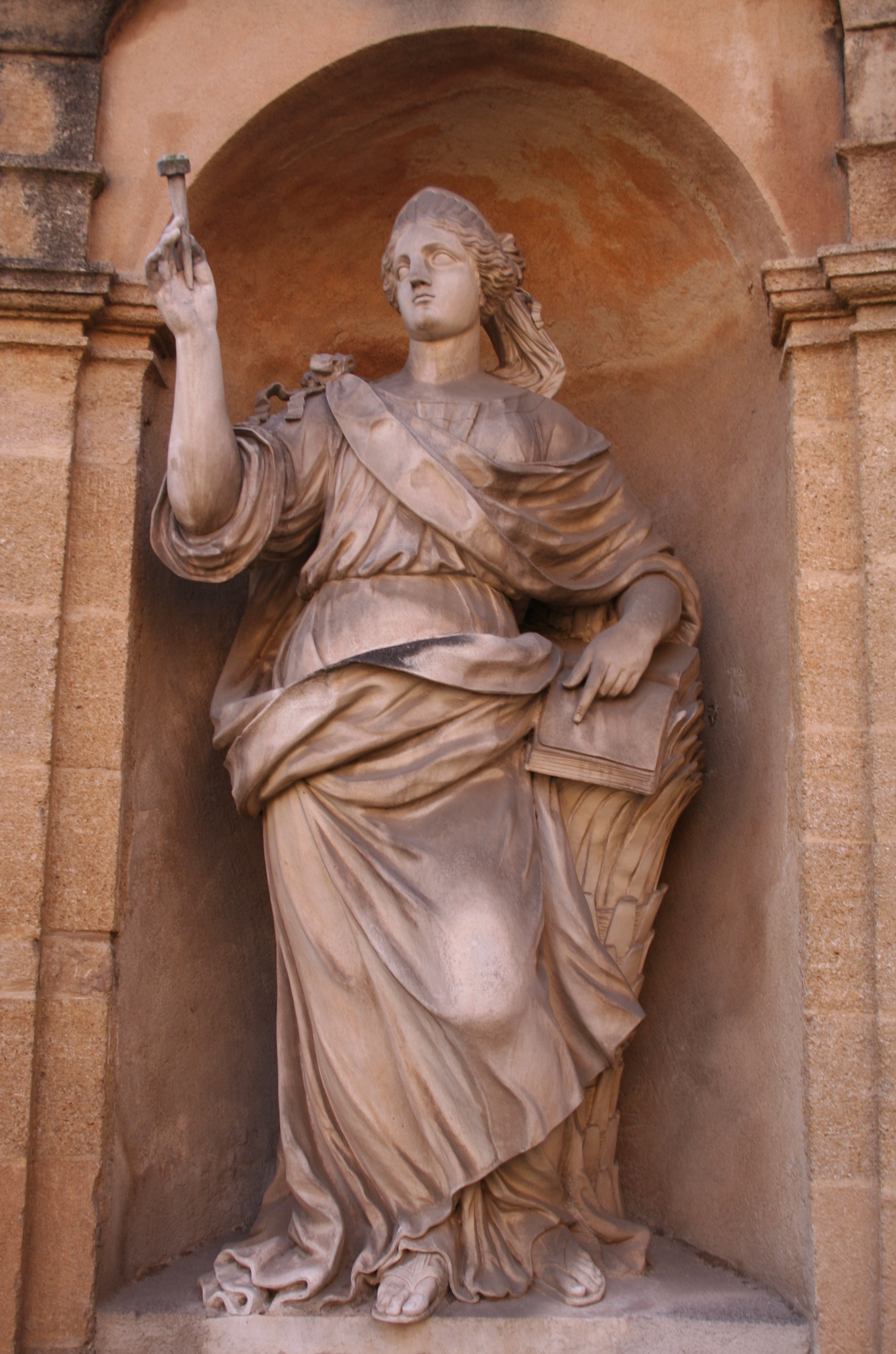

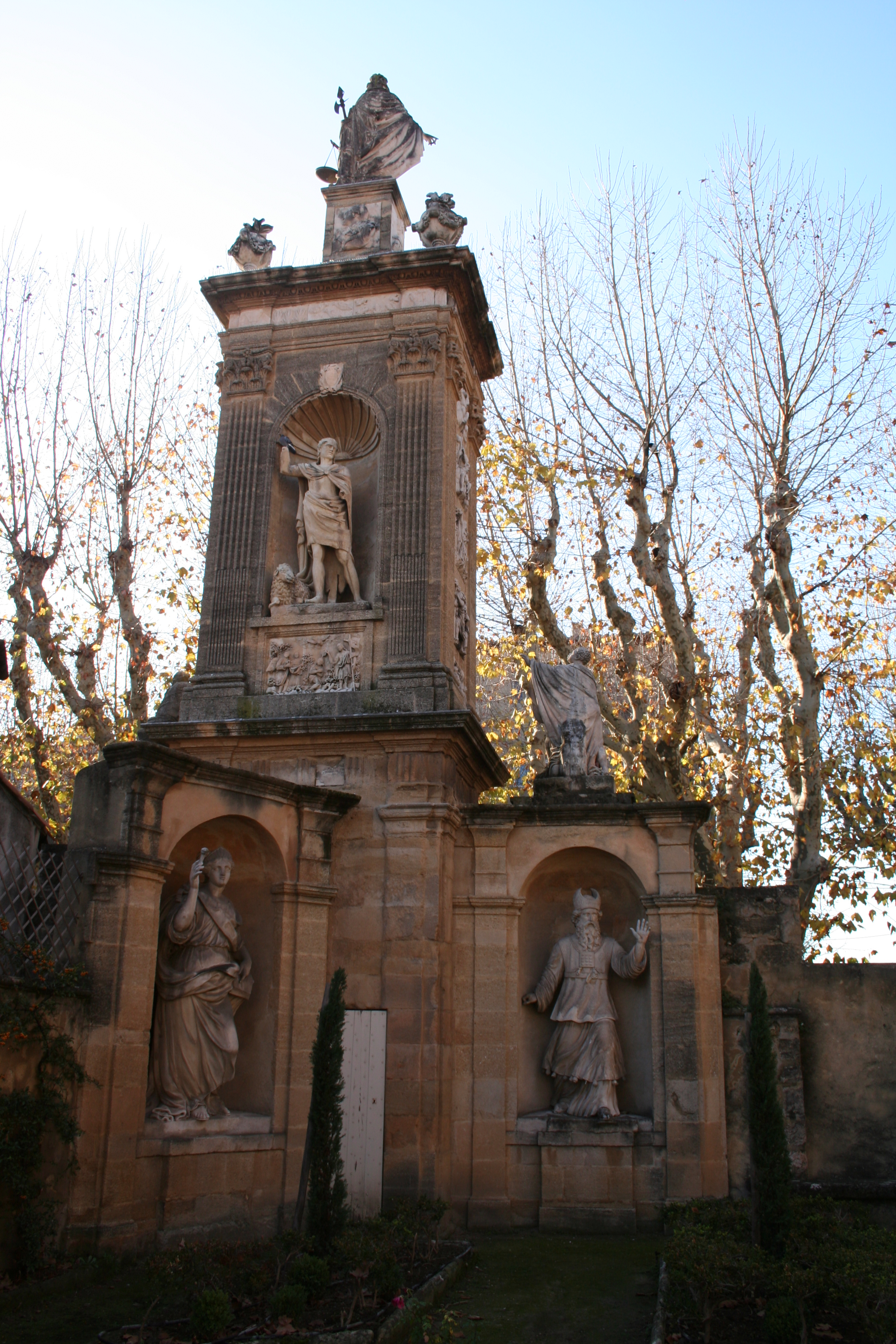

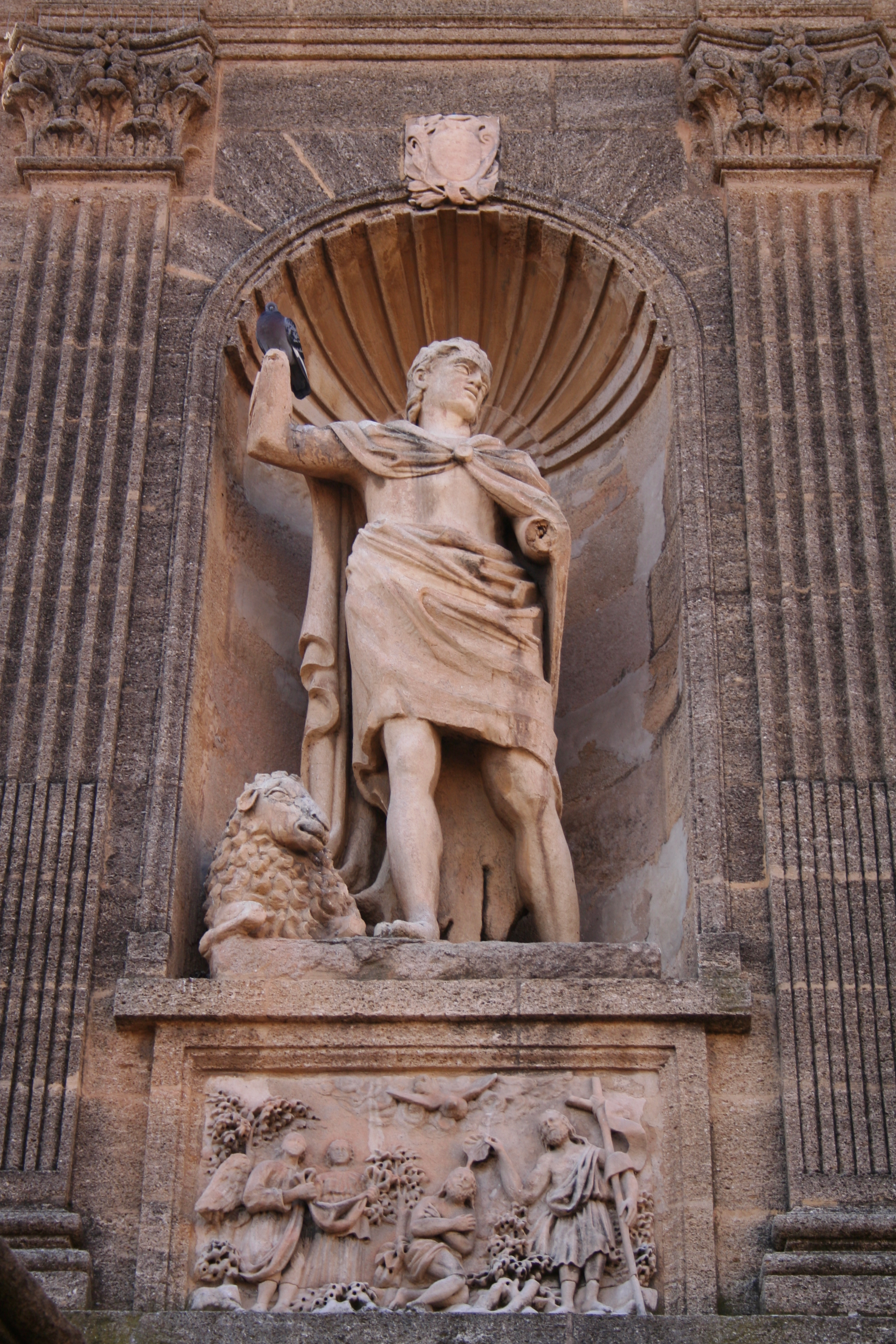

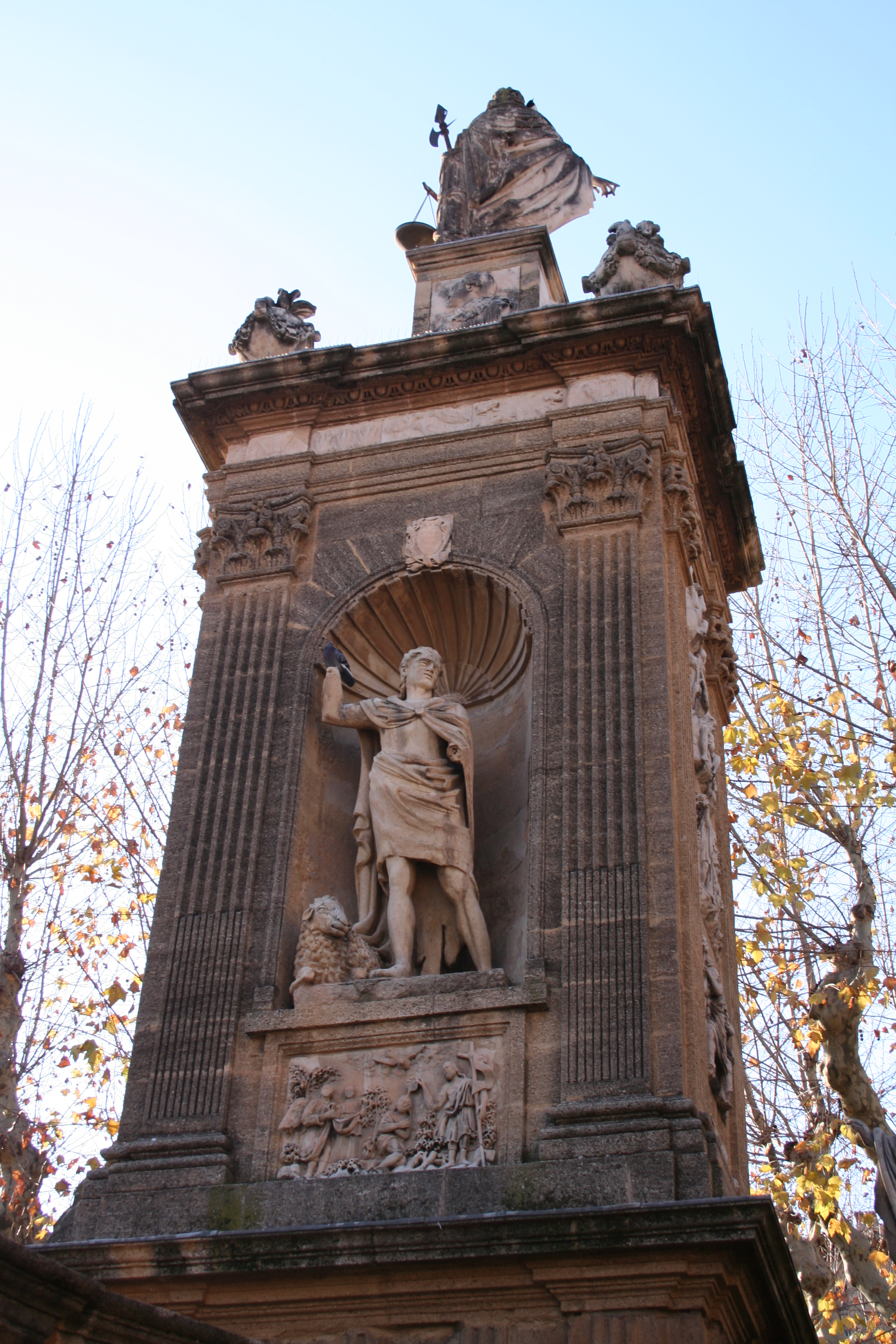
