= Hôtel de Ville, Pertuis =

Town hall in Pertuis, France

Hôtel de Ville
- The main frontage of the Hôtel de Ville in March 2019

General information
- Type: City hall
- Architectural style: Neoclassical style
- Location: Pertuis, France
- Coordinates: 43.6946°N 5.5031°E
- Completed: c.1690

The Hôtel de Ville (French pronunciation: [otɛl də vil], City Hall) is a municipal building in Pertuis, Vaucluse, in southeastern France, standing on Rue Voltaire.

== History ==
Under the ancien regime, the consuls established their first town hall within the old town walls which had been erected in the 14th century. They then relocated to a building on Rue Saint-Jacques before moving to Rue Saint-Nicolas (now Rue Voltaire) in 1548. The latter building was demolished to facilitate road realignment in 1865.

Following the French revolution the new town council decided to acquire a more substantial building for their meetings. The building they selected, also on Rue Saint-Nicolas (now Rue Voltaire), had been commissioned by Louis d'Archimbaud in the late 17th century. The house had been designed in the neoclassical style, built in ashlar stone and had probably been completed in around 1690. The design of the three-storey building involved a main block of nine bays facing down Rue Voltaire, together with a wing which was projected forward on the left-hand side. The main block contained segmental-headed doorways in the first two bays on the left, while the left-hand wing contained a similar doorway in the first bay on the left. The remainder of the building was fenestrated by segmental-headed windows with shutters. Internally, it incorporated vaulted ceilings from an early 16th century building.

In September 1711, Louis d'Archimbaud entered into an agreement with Joseph de Croze, who lived on Rue du Marché, to exchange houses. Joseph de Croze came from a prominent local family. His father, Melchior de Croze had served in the Battle of Seneffe in August 1674 during the Franco-Dutch War and had been rewarded with the post of Governor of the governor of the fortress of Notre-Dame de la Garde in Marseille in 1685. After Joseph de Croze acquired the house in September 1711, it subsequently passed down the de Croze line to another Joseph de Croze. A former officer in the Gardes de la Marine, this Joseph de Croze saw action in America in 1778 during the American Revolution and was subsequently chosen by the nobles of the town to represent them at the Estates General in March 1789. Seen as an enemy of the revolutionaries, his house was seized by the state during the French Revolution. After lengthy negotiations, the council acquired the building in 1828.

Following the liberation of the town by American troops on 20 August 1944 during the Second World War, a liberation committee led by Maurice Cousin took control inside the building. The committee, acting as a people's tribunal in the town hall and under pressure from the crowd outside the building, then ordered the execution of five collaborators.
