= Suetrii =

Gallic tribe

The Suetrii (Gaulish: *Su(p)etrioi, 'the good birds') or Suetri were a Gallic tribe dwelling around present-day Castellane (Alpes-de-Haute-Provence) during the Iron Age and the Roman period.

== Name ==
They are mentioned as Suebri (var. suberi, uebri) and Svetri by Pliny (1st c. AD), as Souētrōn (Σουητρ...ων; var. Σουιντρ...ων, Σουκτρ...ων) by Ptolemy (2nd c. AD), and as Suetrio on an inscription.

The ethnonym Suetrii can be explained as the Gaulish *su-(p)etri-, meaning 'good birds' (cf. Lat. accipiter).

== Geography ==
=== Territory ===
The Suetrii dwelled in the middle valley of the Verdon river, with an extension in the valley of the Jabron. The Barrington Atlas locates their territory south of the Vergunni and Sentii, west of the Nerusii, and north of the Ligauni. On the west, they were separated from the Sentii and the Reii by the Verdon Gorge.

=== Settlements ===
Their chief town, Salinae (present-day Castellane), was founded during the Roman period and acquired its name after the local supply of salt. Salinae was located west of the medieval town, in an area called Le Plan. It was situated on a trade road leading from Vintium (Vence), near the coast, to Dinia (Dignes), in the Alps, via Salinae and Sanitium (Senez).

The exact location of the pre-Roman oppidum remains unknown, although it was most likely seated on one of the hills surrounding Salinae. Its name may have been Ducelia, as suggested by later medieval documents.

== History ==
They are mentioned by Pliny the Elder as one of the Alpine tribes conquered by Rome in 16–15 BC, and whose name was engraved on the Tropaeum Alpium.
