= Reii =

Celto-Ligurian tribe

The Reii were a Celto-Ligurian tribe dwelling in the modern department of Alpes-de-Haute-Provence during the Iron Age and the Roman period.

== Name ==
The ethnonym Reii has been interpreted as meaning 'the free ones', stemming from an earlier *Reiī (< *Riioi), itself formed with the Celtic stem *riio- ('free'). According to Xavier Delamarre, the Reii could have been a group of freedmen or, more probably, an autonomous tribe among a group of subjugated peoples.

The city of Riez, attested as Alebaece Reiorum Apollinarium in the 1st c. AD (concilium Regense in 439, civitati Regensi in 990–7, Rietz in 1402) is named after the tribe.

== Geography ==
=== Territory ===
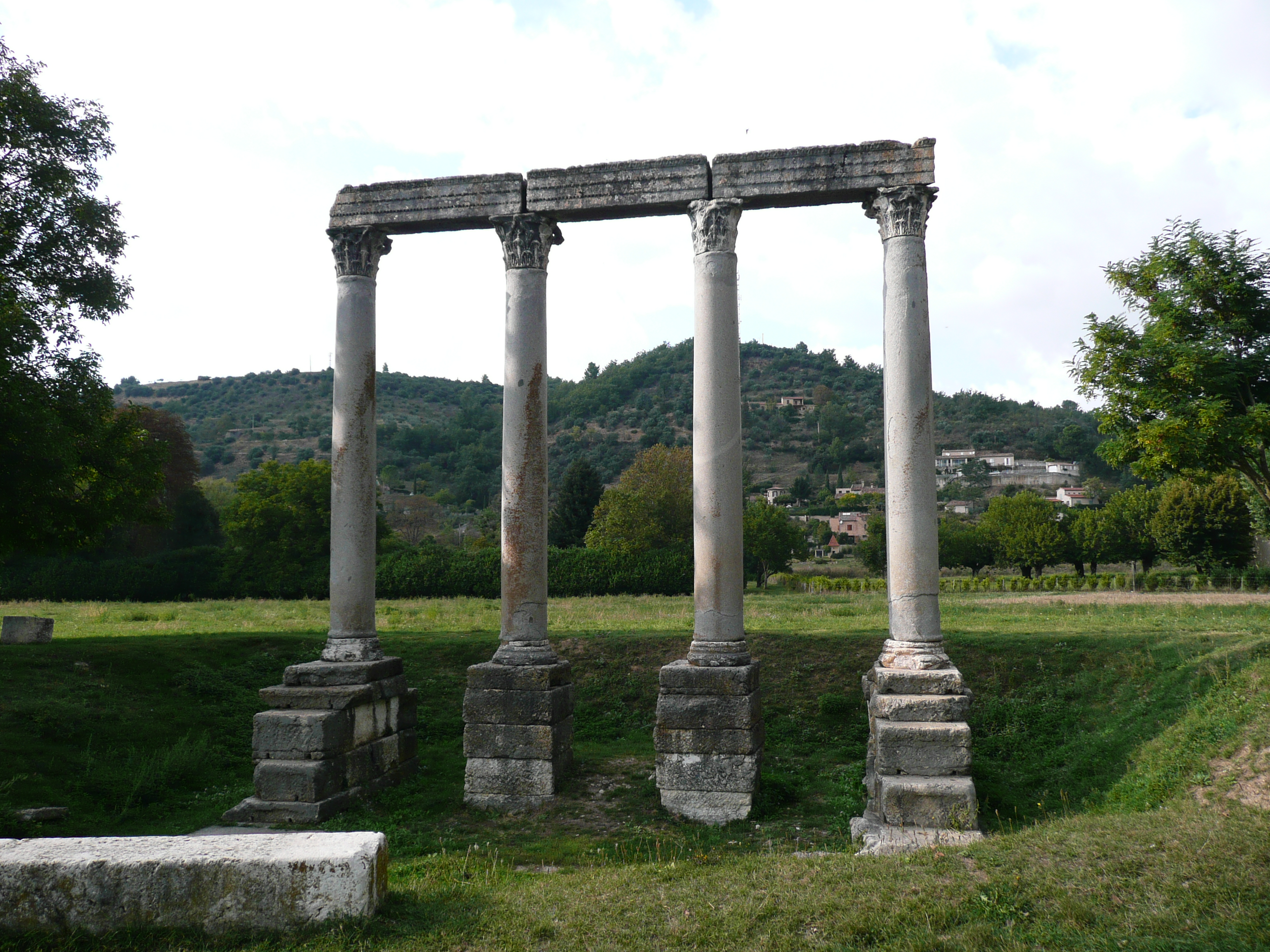
Vestige of the Roman temple in Riez, probably dedicated to Apollo.

The Reii dwelled in the valleys of the Colostre river and its tributaries, and in the lower Verdon valley up to the Durance in the west. They probably also occupied the valleys of the Asse and the Rancure. The eastern frontier of their territory was the boundary between the provinces of Narbonensis and Alpes Maritimae. The Barrington Atlas locates their territory north of the Verucini and Tritolli (themselves north of the Salyes), south of the Vocontii, east of the Dexivates, and west of the Sentii, Suetrii and Vergunni. According to historian Guy Barruol, they were part of the Saluvian confederation.

=== Settlements ===
Their chief town was Alebaece (modern Riez), located at the foot of the hill of Saint-Maxime, at the confluence of the Colostre with its tributary the Auvestre. The city was located near a main route linking Fréjus with Sisteron and other places further north. From the reign of Augustus, it became known as Iulia Augusta Apollinaris Reiorum. Reiorum is a Latin formation based on the name of the tribe. Alebaece was probably the name of the pre-Roman hill-fort on St-Maxime, and it has been connected with the ethnonym Albici, the tribe that helped Massalia in her fight against Caesar in 49 BC. The Council of Reii was held in the city in 439 AD.

Another important settlement was located at Gréoux-les-Bains, a Roman spa town where was found a dedication to the Nymphae Griselicae made by Annia Fundania Faustina.
