= Trumpilini =

The Trumpilini were an ancient tribe that settled in Val Trompia, one of three main valleys in the Province of Brescia in Northern Italy.

Roman writer Pliny the Elder, referring to Origines by Cato the Elder, states that the Trumpilini were one of three lineages of the Euganei.

The Tropaeum Alpium in present-day La Turbie (built c. 7 BC) mentions the Trumpilini among the names of peoples that have been subjugated by the Empire in c. 16 BC during the Roman conquest of Rhetia and the Alps. A secondary tradition of Pliny contains a prescriber: Triumpilini.

== Literature ==
- Ernest George Hardy: Roman Laws and Charters. Clarendon Press, Oxford 1912, p. 120.
