= Vesubiani =

Gallic tribe

The Vesubiani or Vesubianii were a Gallic tribe dwelling in the valley of the Vésubie river during the Iron Age.

== Name ==
They are mentioned as Vesubiani by Pliny (1st c. AD), and as Vesubianorum and (V)esubiani on inscriptions.

Guy Barruol noted that the loss of initial V- is common in Gaulish proper names, especially in Provence, and proposed to see the name as a variant of the personal name Esubiani. He suggested that the name may have the same root as Esubii, the name of a tribe in Brittany itself traditionally derived from the Celtic god Esus. Alternatively, if the V- was present in the original form, the name can be derived from the Gaulish root uesu- ('valid, good, worthy').

== Geography ==
The Vesubiani dwelled in the valley of the Vésubie. The Barrington Atlas locates their territory southeast of the Ecdinii, north of the Nerusii and Vediantii, and northwest of the Intimilii. According to A. L. F. Rivet, "there appear to have been no significant settlements in the lands of the Ecdinii and the Vesubiani, so that they must have been controlled by Cemenelum when they had been detached from the Cottian kingdom."

Along with the Ecdinii and Veaminii, they were part of the Capillati.

== History ==
They are mentioned by Pliny the Elder as one of the Alpine tribes conquered by Rome in 16–15 BC, and whose name was engraved on the Tropaeum Alpium. They also appear on the Arch of Susa, erected by Cottius in 9–8 BC.
