= Sogionti =

Gallic tribe

The Sogionti or Sogiontii were a Gallic tribe dwelling around present-day Sisteron during the Iron Age.

== Name ==
They are mentioned as Sogionti (var. songi-, sonti-) by Pliny (1st c. AD), and as Sogionti and Sogion[ti]or(um) on inscriptions.

The meaning of the name remains obscure. Guy Barruol compared the first element to the toponym Soio.

== Geography ==
The Sogiontii lived in the middle valley of the Durance river, around present-day Sisteron (Segustero). The Barrington Atlas locates their territory north of the Reii, west of the Bodiontici, east of the Vocontii, and south of the Sebaginni.

They were probably part of the Vocontian confederation.

== History ==
They are mentioned by Pliny the Elder as one of the Alpine tribes conquered by Rome in 16–15 BC, and whose name was engraved on the Tropaeum Alpium.
