= Triulatti =

Gallic tribe

The Triulatti (Gaulish: *Triulat(t)oi, 'the three rulers') were a Gallic tribe dwelling in the French Alps during the Iron Age.

== Name ==
They are mentioned as Triullati by Pliny (1st c. AD).

The ethnic name Triulatti is a latinized form of Gaulish *Triulat(t)oi, meaning 'the three rulers'. It stems from the prefix tri- ('three') attached to ulatos ('prince').

== Geography ==
The Triulatti dwelled in the southern part of the French Alps. Their exact location remains uncertain. According to Guy Barruol, they may have been part of the civitas of the Sentii.

== History ==
They are mentioned by Pliny the Elder as one of the Alpine tribes conquered by Rome in 16–15 BC, and whose name was engraved on the Tropaeum Alpium.
