= Bodiontici =

Gallic tribe

The Bodiontici or Brodiontii were a Gallic tribe dwelling around present-day Digne (Alpes-de-Haute-Provence) during the Roman period.

== Name ==
They are mentioned as Bodionticos by Pliny (1st c. AD). Possible variants are also attested as Brodionti(i), Bodionio and Bodi(ontio?) on inscriptions.

The ethnic name Bodiontici appears to derive from the Gaulish stem bodio- ('blond') attached to -ont-ici.

== Geography ==
The Bodiontici dwelled around present-day Digne, in the valley of the Bléone river. The Barrington Atlas locates their territory north of the Sentii, south of the Gallitae, east of the Sogiontii, and west of the Eguiturii and Nemeturii.

In Roman times, their civitas was situated around the basin of the river Bléone and its tributary the Bès. In 69 AD, the territory of the Bodiontici was transferred, along with that of the Avantici, to the province of Gallia Narbonensis by Galba. According to A. L. F. Rivet, this decision "may have been due to the influence of the former provincial governor, T. Vinius Rufus, who effectively controlled Galba and joined him in the consulship in 69."

Their chief town was known as Dinia (present-day Digne; Gaulish Dīniā 'the shelter'). Like the modern settlement, it likely served as a spa town in ancient times. Dinia was transferred to the province of Alpes Maritimae in the Later Empire.
