= Gallitae =

Gallic tribe

The Gallitae were a Gallic tribe dwelling in the upper valley of the Bléone river (Alpes-de-Haute-Provence) during the Iron Age.

== Name ==
They are mentioned as Gallitae (var. -tre) by Pliny (1st c. AD) and on an inscription.

The name Gallitae appears to be based on the Celtic root gal(l)-, meaning 'power, ability', which can also be found in the ethnic names Galli (Gauls) and Galátai (Galatians).

== Geography ==
The Gallitae lived in the upper valley of the Bléone river, in a land later called ager Galadius in the early Middle Ages (813–814 AD). The Barrington Atlas locates their territory north of the Bodiontici, east of the Sogiontii and Sebaginni, west of the Eguiturii, south of the Edenates.

== History ==
They are mentioned by Pliny the Elder as one of the Alpine tribes conquered by Rome in 16–15 BC, and whose name was engraved on the Tropaeum Alpium.
