= Adanates =

Gallic tribe

The Adanates or Edenates were a small Gallic tribe dwelling around present-day Seyne, in the Alpes Cottiae, during the Iron Age.

== Name ==
They are mentioned as Edenates (var. edemn-) by Pliny (1st c. AD), and as Adanatium on the Arc of Susa.

The etymology of the name Adanates is unclear. Guy Barruol has proposed to compare it with Adenatius (or Adenatis) and Adana, and postulated an original *Senedenates, with loss of the initial s- retained in Sedena, the name of their chief town. According to Alexander Falileyev, "if the original form was indeed *Sed-, the name could be Celtic, from sedo- 'seat, location'; but in view of the form recorded in inscriptions, it is unlikely. If Eden- is the original form, the name does not appear Celtic." Xavier Delamarre has proposed to interpret the name as Ed-en-ati ('those from the land/country'), from a Gaulish stem edo-(n)- ('space, land').

== Geography ==
The Adanates dwelled around the settlement of Sedena (modern Seyne). The Barrington Atlas locates their territory south of the Avantici, west of the Savincates, east of the Sebaginni, and north of the Gallitae and Eguiturii.

== History ==
They are mentioned by Pliny the Elder as one of the Alpine tribes conquered by Rome in 16–15 BC, and whose name was engraved on the Tropaeum Alpium. They also appear on the Arch of Susa, erected by Cottius in 9–8 BC.
