= Velaunii =

Gallic tribe

The Velaunii or Velauni (Gaulish: *Uelaunoi) were a Gallic tribe dwelling in the western Alps during the Iron Age.

== Name ==
They are mentioned as Velauni by Pliny (1st c. AD), and probably as Οὐελαυνίους on an inscription.

The ethnonym Velaunī is a latinized form of Gaulish *Uelaunoi (sing. *Uelaunos). It may mean the 'chiefs, commandants', or else be derived from the Indo-European root *wel- ('to see') attached to the suffix -auni (< *āmn-ī), also found in Ingauni and Ligauni.

== Geography ==
The Velaunii dwelled in the western Alps, possibly in the valley of the Estéron, a tributary of the Var. Their chief town may have been Brigantio (modern Briançonnet). Although no pre-Roman occupation has been found in archaeological records, the development of the Roman city suggests the presence of preexisting communities in the valley of the Estéron.

== History ==
They are mentioned by Pliny the Elder as one of the Alpine tribes conquered by Rome in 16–15 BC, and whose name was engraved on the Tropaeum Alpium.

A treaty of hospitality with a Greek city, possibly Massalia, was recorded by an inscription on a bronze hand dated to the 2nd–1st century BC. According to Guy Barruol, it may have been a laissez-passer for Greek caravan merchants on the Velaunian territory.
