= Ingauni =

Celto-Ligurian tribe

The Ingauni (perhaps also Sengauni) were a Celto-Ligurian tribe dwelling on the Mediterranean coast, around the modern city of Albenga (Liguria), during the Iron Age and the Roman period.

== Name ==
They are mentioned as Ingauni by Livy (late 1st c. BC), Ingaunoi (”Iγγαυνοι) by Strabo (early 1st c. AD), and as Ingaunis by Pliny (1st c. AD). The Peutinger Table also places a people called the Sengauni in the eastern Ligurian Riviera, in the Apennine hinterland inland from Luna (modern Luni). Their reality is doubtful. The name may be no more than a distant doubling of the Ingauni, though Ubaldo Formentini took it for a distinct people of the Monte Gottero district, and Mario Niccolò Conti for a smaller group around Zignago.

The suffix -auno- recurs in several ethnonyms of the Celtic area, such as Alauni (< *alamnoi), Anauni (< *ana-mn-oi) and Genauni (< *géno-mnoi). Patrizia de Bernardo Stempel derives the name from an earlier *Pingāmnī (‘the painted ones'), with loss of initial p-, which would be semantically comparable to the ethnonym Picti (Picts). According to her, such linguistically Celtic tribal names suggest that a Celto-Ligurian dialect played an important role among the languages spoken in ancient Ligury.

The modern city of Albenga, attested as oppidum Album Ingaunum by Pliny and as Albingaunum by Strabo, is named after the Ligurian tribe.

== Geography ==
The Ingauni lived on the Mediterranean coast, around Album Ingaunum (modern Albenga) and Lucus Bormani (Diano Marina). The Barrington Atlas locates their territory east of the Intimilii, and south of the Epanterii.

Their chief town was known as Album Igaunum or Albingaunum.

== History ==
=== Punic War ===
By the 3rd century BC, the prosperity of thriving Ligurian coastal centres led to recurrent conflicts with mountainous tribes conducting raids on their richer neighbours. During the Second Punic War (218–201 BC), Mago Barca made an alliance in 205 BC with the Ingauni to secure a foothold on the Italian coast. He helped them in their fight against the Epanterii, who lived above them on the hills and raided their territory. He had previously destroyed the Ingaunian rival Genoa, thus allowing them to potentially become the dominant force on the northwestern coast of Italy. Fearing that Mago may unite Gauls and Ligurians against them, the Romans reacted by sending troops to the region and defeated Mago and its allies. In 201 BC, the Roman consul Publius Aelius Paetus signed a peace treaty with the Ingauni to secure the part of the trading route they controlled between Iberia, Massalia and Rome.

=== Roman conquest ===
In 185 BC, a consular army led by Appius Claudius Pulcher was sent against the Ingauni, capturing six of their oppida and, as an example to the vanquished or a deterrent to other Ligurians, he had forty-three Ingauni accused of being responsible for the war beheaded. Only three years later, however, the Massaliotes complained again to Rome about Ligurian piracy, and the consul Lucius Aemilius Paullus was asked by the Senate to bring definite peace on both sea and land. Seeking to avoid a complete destruction of the Ingauni, which could have led to a coastal frontier vacuum potentially filled by less acculturated Alpine tribes, Paullus initially entered the Ingaunian territory to demand their surrender. The Igaunian leaders then feinted to request a delay to consult their fellow tribesmen, using the respite to mass their troops and besiege Paullus' camp, but the consul eventually succeeded in subjugating the Ingauni and received triumph in 181 BC. Although Paullus prohibited the Ingauni from erecting ramparts around their towns to hinder their defensive capabilities, he also left them in control of their piece of coastal land for them to act as sentinels on the Ligurian route.

In 180 BC, the consul Aulus Postumius Albinus, after vanquishing the nearby mountain Ligurians, felt the need to send ships to reconnoiter the shores of the Ingauni and Intemelii, which suggests that they were still considered by Rome a potentially hostile tribe at that time.
