= Tropaeum Alpium =

Roman victory monument at La Turbie, France

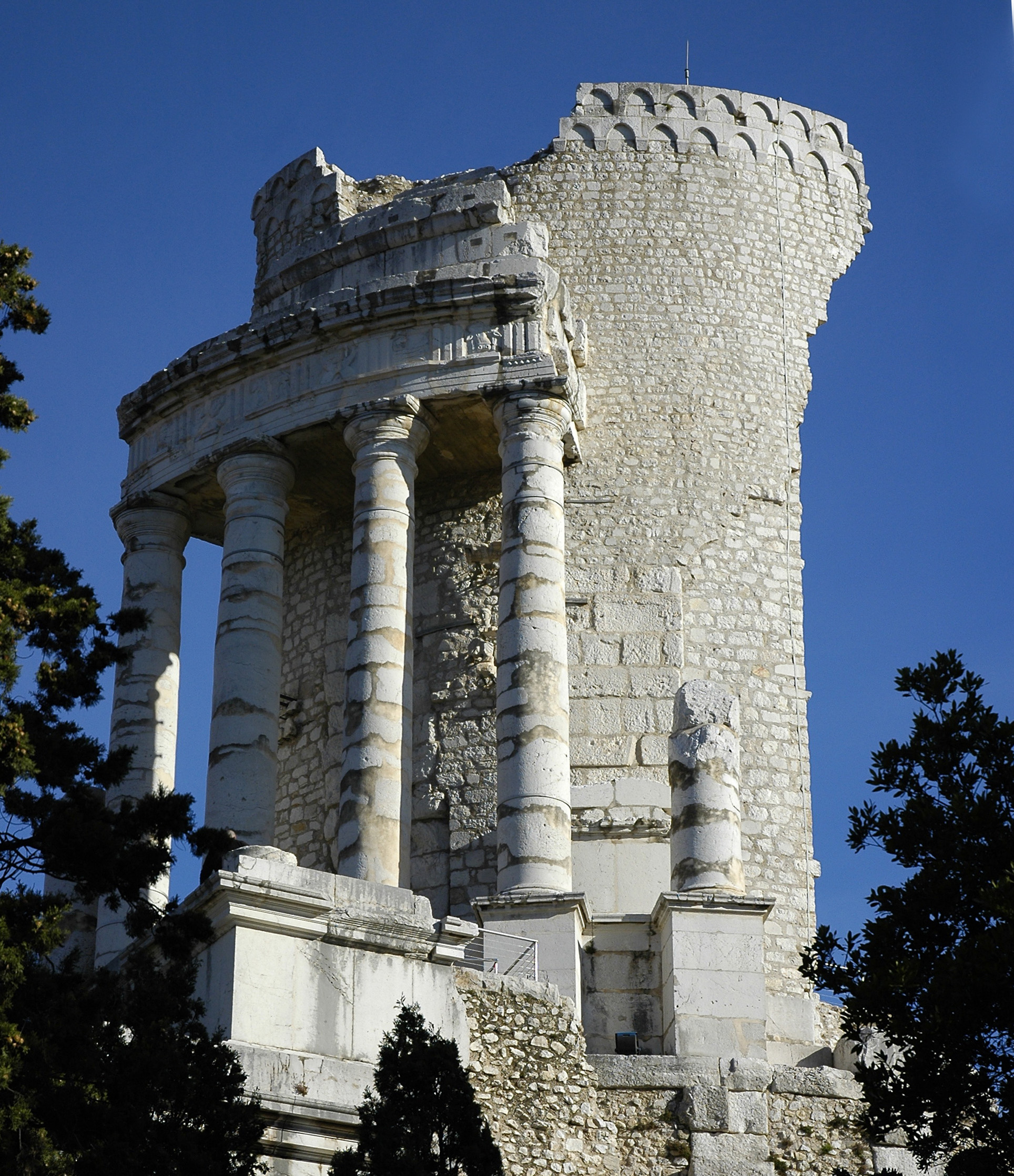
The Trophy of Augustus

The Tropaeum Alpium (Latin for 'Trophy of the Alps', French Trophée des Alpes or Trophée d'Auguste), is a Roman victory monument (tropaeum) erected at La Turbie in the Alpes-Maritimes, above Monaco. It commemorated the subjection of the Alpine peoples to the imperium of the Roman people under Augustus. Its dedication is dated by the inscription transmitted by Pliny the Elder to 7/6 BC, while the military operations it recorded had probably taken place between 25 and 14 BC. The monument stood at the highest point of the Via Julia Augusta as it crossed the Alps, at the confines of Italy and Gaul, and is known today chiefly through the heavily restored form given to its ruins in the early 20th century.

== Name and inscription ==
The text of the monument's dedication survives through a literary quotation by Pliny the Elder, who closed the third book of his Natural History on Italy with a description of the Alpine chain and cited the inscription to illustrate the multitude of Alpine peoples. Pliny calls the monument tropaeum Alpium but gives neither its form nor its location.

The inscription records that the monument was dedicated to Augustus by the senate and people of Rome because under his command and auspices all the Alpine peoples extending from the upper sea to the lower, that is from the Adriatic to the Tyrrhenian, had been brought under the imperium of the Roman people, and lists the peoples described as "conquered" (devictae). The text transmitted by Pliny adds that fifteen Cottian communities which had not been hostile were not included. Binninger suggests this clause may derive not from the dedication itself but from one of the official documents Pliny was drawing on. The text names the conquered peoples but does not enumerate every Alpine people, only those defeated.

Among the many epigraphic fragments recovered at La Turbie, one preserving the name of the Trumpilini, a people of the Val Trompia listed by Pliny, allowed scholars to connect Pliny's citation with the mention by Ptolemy of the Tropaia Sebastou near Monaco, and so to identify the ruins of La Turbie with the Trophy of the Alps. The reconstructed inscription can now be read on the rebuilt west face of the monument, where the surviving fragments were replaced and completed with modern blocks.

One of the stones of the tower contained the names of the peoples. The inscription survived only in fragments, but could be reconstructed thanks to the transcription of Pliny the Elder, albeit with minor divergences from the manuscript text. As set up on the monument the inscription was 17 metres (55.8 feet) long and 3.66 metres (12 feet) high, laid out in nine lines, and about 140 surviving original fragments were inset into a modern marble panel on which the text was re-engraved. It reads:

IMP · CAESARI DIVI FILIO AVG · PONT · MAX · IMP · XIIII · TR · POT · XVII · S · P · Q · R · QVOD EIVS DVCTV AVSPICIISQVE GENTES ALPINAE OMNES QVAE A MARI SVPERO AD INFERVM PERTINEBANT SVB IMPERIVM P · R · SVNT REDACTAE · GENTES ALPINAE DEVICTAE :

To the emperor Caesar Augustus, son of the deified [Julius Caesar], Pontifex Maximus, hailed as Imperator for the 14th time, in his 17th year of tribunician power, the Senate and people of Rome [built this], in commemoration that, under his leadership and auspices, all the Alpine peoples, from the Upper Sea to the Lower Sea, were submitted to the Imperium of the Roman People. Conquered Alpine peoples:

· TRUMPILINI
· CAMUNNI
· VENNONETES
· VENOSTES
· ISARCI
· BREUNI
· GENAUNES
· FOCUNATES

· VINDELICI:
·· COSUANETES
·· RUCINATES
·· LICATES
·· CATENATES
· AMBISONTES
· RUGUSCI
· SUANETES
· CALUCONES
· BRIXENETES

· LEPONTII
· UBERI
· NANTUATES
· SEDUNI
· VERAGRI
· SALASSI
· ACITAUONES
· MEDULLI
· UCENNI
· CATURIGES

· BRIGIANI
· SOGIONTI
· BRODIONTI
· NEMALONI
· EDENATES
· VESUBIANI
· VEAMINI
· GALLITAE
· TRIULLATI

· ECDINI
· VERGUNNI
· EGUITURI
· NEMATURI
· ORATELLI
· NERUSI
· VELAUNI
· SUETRI.

== Location ==
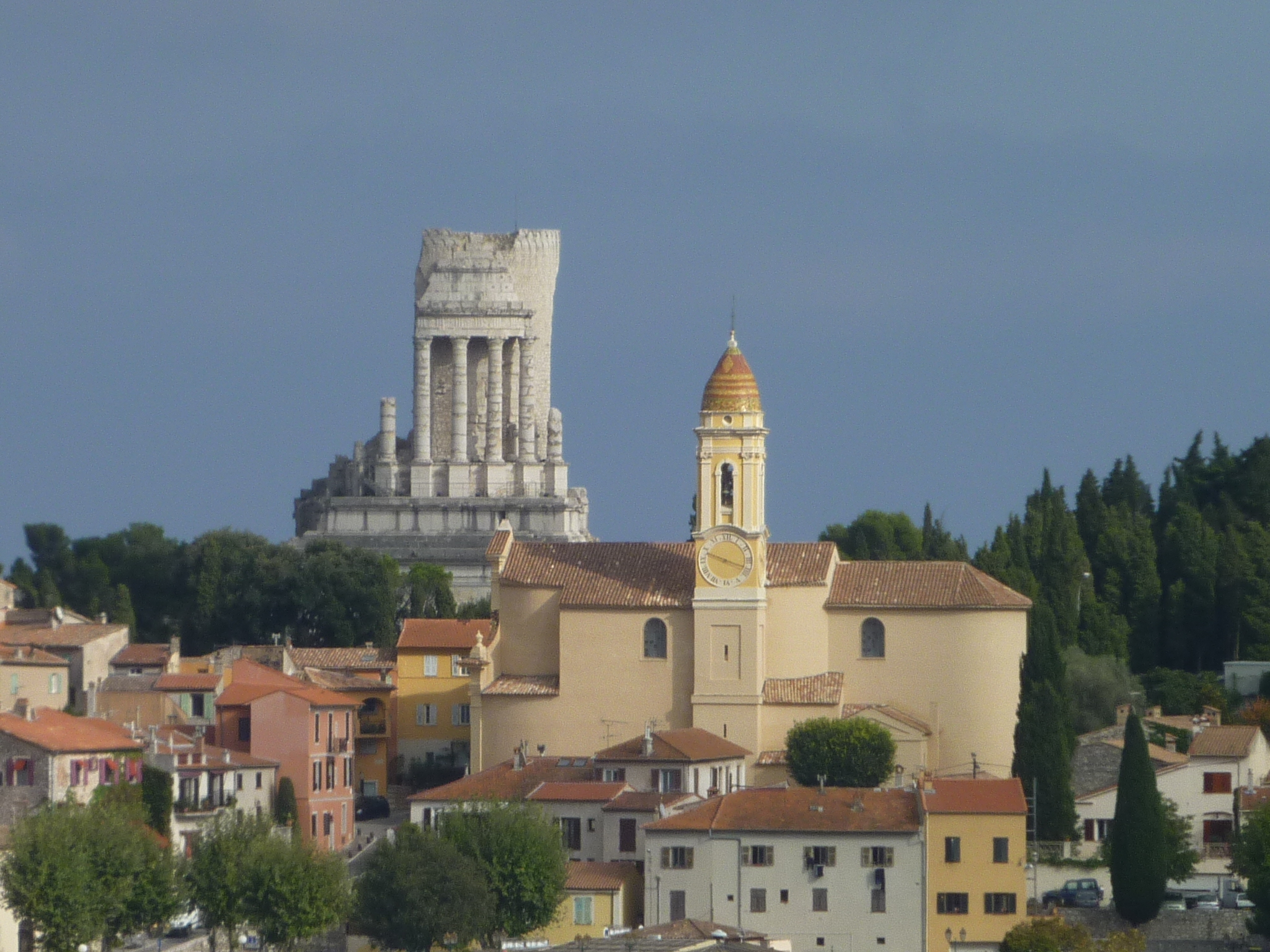
The Tropaeum Alpium over La Turbie

The monument stood on one of the last spurs of the Alps, slightly overlooking the col of La Turbie, the Alpis summa that marked the crossing of the Alps on the coastal route. It was associated with the Via Julia Augusta, marked out with milestones in 13/12 BC, and the road and monument may have belonged to a common building programme, although the exact date of the trophy's construction is not known.

For a traveller coming from Italy, the col of La Turbie marked both the end of an arduous Alpine crossing and a break in the landscape, the road turning inland on the far side. The trophy could thus signal the confines of Italy, an idea that emerges from the structure of Pliny's own text, in which the Alps "close" Italy. Sophie Binninger notes that the col was not a strategic point comparable to the other Alpine passes, and that the commemoration of the Alpine victory at this low southern col was a symbolic choice rather than a reflection of the site's military importance. Whether the trophy also marked an administrative or fiscal boundary remains uncertain, the sources allowing several interpretations of the notion of a limit at this point.

== History ==
=== Historical background ===
The ancient authors give little information on the chronology of the Alpine campaigns, which had probably unfolded between 25 and 14 BC. The principal narratives concern the campaigns of Augustus's legates, who acted in his name. In 25 BC the Salassi of the Aosta Valley, whom Rome had repeatedly tried to subdue, were finally crushed. Between 17 and 15 BC several peoples of the central and eastern Alps were subjected, the southern and then the northern slopes were taken, and the Roman armies advanced to the Danube, conquering Raetia. In the western Alps, the still-independent Ligurians known as the Comati were reduced in 14 BC. The construction of the Via Julia in 13/12 BC suggests that by then the essential operations in the coastal region had been carried out.

The victory in the Alps was commemorated in several places and in various ways. Having declined the triumph decreed to him by the senate in 25 BC, Augustus was honoured instead by an arch bearing trophies, identified by modern historians with the arch at Aosta, and by an arch dedicated at Susa in 9/8 BC. The dedication of the trophy itself, dated by Pliny's text to 7/6 BC, falls within the period of Augustus's administrative reorganization of Italy, and it is unclear whether the date corresponds to the senate's decision, the consecration of the monument, or its inauguration.

The trophy introduced a novelty in the Roman commemorative tradition. Even in its monumentalized forms, the ancient rite of the trophy had always been addressed to the deity who had secured the victory, with the general taking an increasingly prominent place from the Hellenistic period onward. The Tropaeum Alpium was dedicated to Augustus himself, honouring him as a god. Gilbert Charles Picard inferred from this a cult rendered to the genius of Augustus at La Turbie, but Binninger considers the evidence insufficient to establish that an imperial cult was practised at the site.

=== Modern history and restoration ===
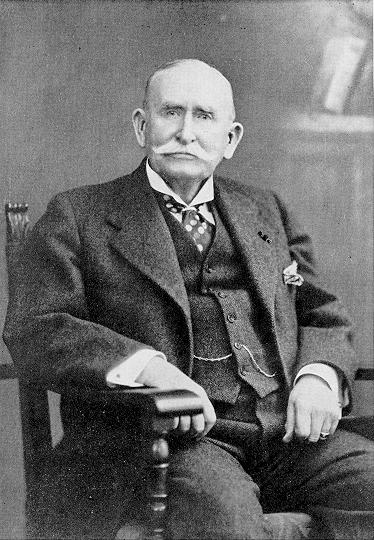
American banker Edward Tuck, who financed restoration works in the 1920–1930s

Over the centuries the monument was repeatedly fortified and damaged, and it was partly destroyed by mining in 1705, after which it served as a quarry. The ruined trophy-tower was the object of three major campaigns of intervention between the mid-19th and mid-20th centuries.

A first campaign, undertaken by the Sardinian government between 1857 and 1859, consolidated the medieval tower with a masonry buttress and an enclosing wall, explicitly maintaining the building in its existing state rather than restoring its original form. After the County of Nice was attached to France in 1860, the trophy was classed as a monument historique in 1865. From 1905 to 1908 the Société française des fouilles archéologiques, through the local scholar Philippe Casimir, carried out extensive clearing of the site, uncovering hundreds of large dressed blocks and numerous architectural and sculptural fragments. The architect Jean-Camille Formigé, who had produced a graphic restitution of the supposed original state, directed a strict anastylosis reusing original elements, including the re-erection of two columns and their entablature between 1913 and 1915.

After the First World War his son Jules Formigé took over the monument and, between 1920 and 1934, carried out a far more extensive programme of partial reconstruction and landscaping. The west face was rebuilt to carry the inscription, which Formigé regarded as the essence of the monument, while part of the building was deliberately left untouched. Thirty-two houses were bought and demolished to clear the surroundings and recover reused fragments, and a Mediterranean planted space and a museum were created around the monument. The works, intiammy refused by the commission of monuments historiques in 1924 and financed by the American patron Edward Tuck, were inaugurated in 1934. Jules Formigé set out his work in a full publication, a supplement to Gallia, in 1949. The museum created beside the monument bears the name of Edward Tuck.

== Analysis ==
=== Architecture and scholarly reconstruction ===
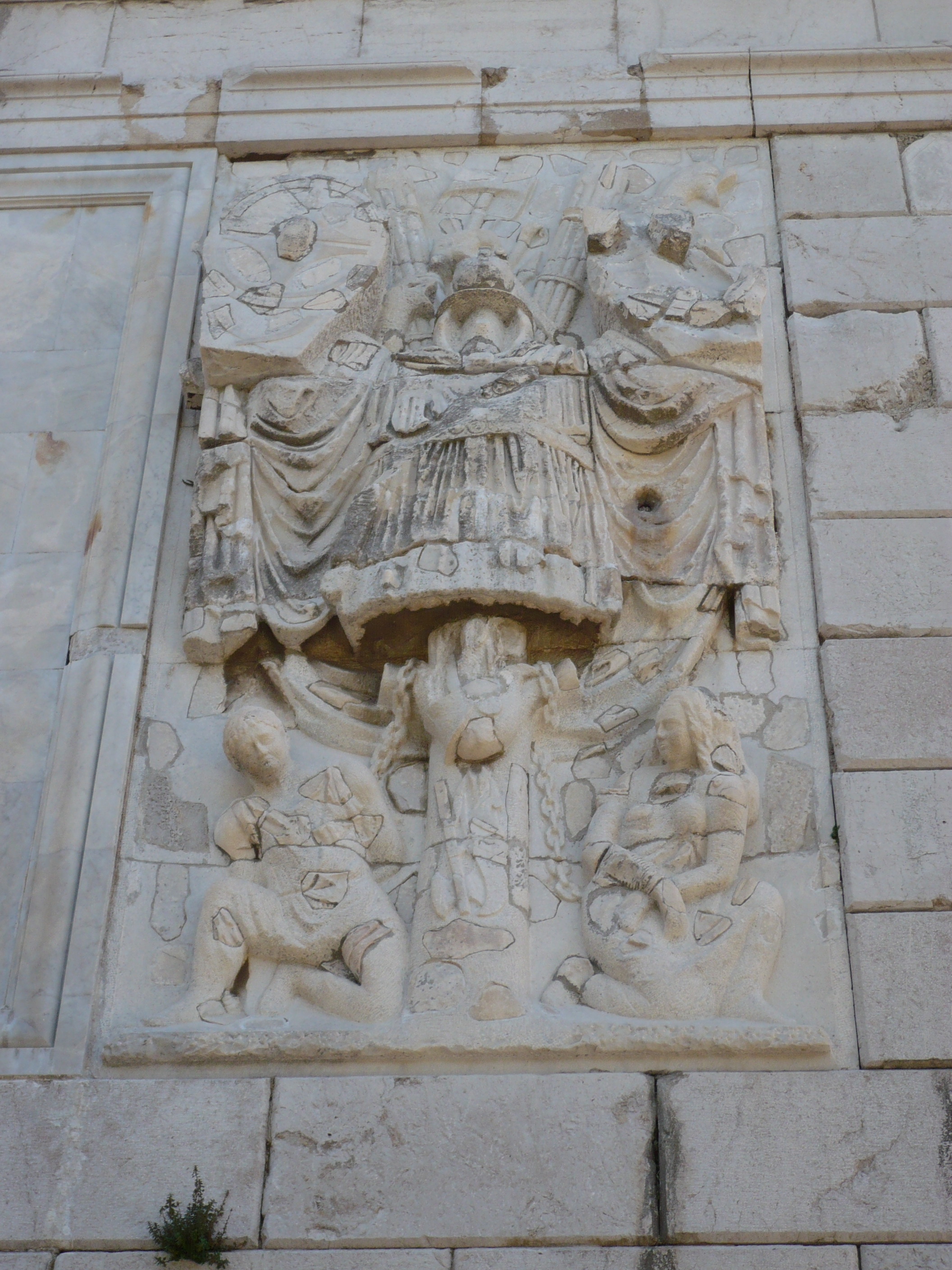
Details of sculptures

The clearing of the ruins allowed the plan of the building to be read and its general principles of elevation to be understood: a mixed quadrangular and cylindrical structure, comprising a double square base surmounted by a circular colonnade. The architects Jean-Camille and Jules Formigé proposed a reconstruction in which the inscription, framed by Victories and flanked by reliefs, occupied the lower base; statues of Augustus's legates and members of the imperial family stood behind the colonnade at the intermediate level; and a statue of Augustus crowned the whole.

This reconstruction remains largely hypothetical. Binninger stresses that the detail of the ordonnance, the internal circulation spaces, and the respective heights of the architectural parts are uncertain, and that the surviving sculpted remains are extremely fragmentary, probably insufficient to provide a coherent view of the iconographic programme or to support a symbolic commentary. The poor state of preservation and the rarity of comparable monuments, which deprives the trophy of typological parallels, remain an obstacle to any attempt at restitution.

=== Interpretation ===
Binninger argues that the choice of site at La Turbie was not accidental but part of an iconographic and ideological construction that heroized Augustus. The trophy was associated in the same landscape with a sanctuary dedicated to the Heracles called Monoikos at Monaco, a connection that, in her reading, the surviving literary sources tend even to place above the trophy itself. The proximity of Hercules, presented as the earlier opener of routes through the mountains and as a civilizing and triumphant hero destined for divinization, reinforced the heroizing connotation of the monument and offered a model for the predestination of Augustus. Binninger notes, however, that the nature and antiquity of the cult of Hercules at the site remain unresolved, the surviving evidence for the Monoecan Hercules consisting only of occurrences of imperial or late date.

Set at the extremity of the Alps, the trophy of Augustus formed a counterpart to the one Pompey had erected at the eastern end of the Pyrenees after his victory over the towns allied with Sertorius. Where Pompey's monument had drawn criticism for commemorating a civil war, the trophy of Augustus, dedicated by the senate and people of Rome, remained beyond suspicion.
