= Intimilii =

Ligurian tribe

The Intimilii or Intemelii were a Ligurian tribe dwelling on the Mediterranean coast, around present-day Ventimiglia, during the Iron Age and the Roman period.

== Name ==
They are mentioned as Intimilii by Caelius Rufus (49 BC), Intemelii by Livy (late 1st c. BC), and as Intemélioi (Ἰντεμέλιοι) by Strabo (early 1st c. AD).

The modern city of Ventimiglia, attested as oppidum Album Intimilium by Pliny (late 1st c. AD) and as Álbion Intemélion (Ἄλβιον Ἰντεμέλιον) by Strabo, is named after the Ligurian tribe.

The ethnonym is built with the double suffix *-elio- on a base whose origin is disputed. Patrizia de Bernardo Stempel has proposed to interpret their chief town, Album Intimilium, as stemming from an earlier *Albion Vindi-mell-ion ('the white-hill town'). Giulia Petracco Sicardi connects instead a base *ent-emo- with Indo-European *entos ('within'; cf. Latin intus).

== Geography ==
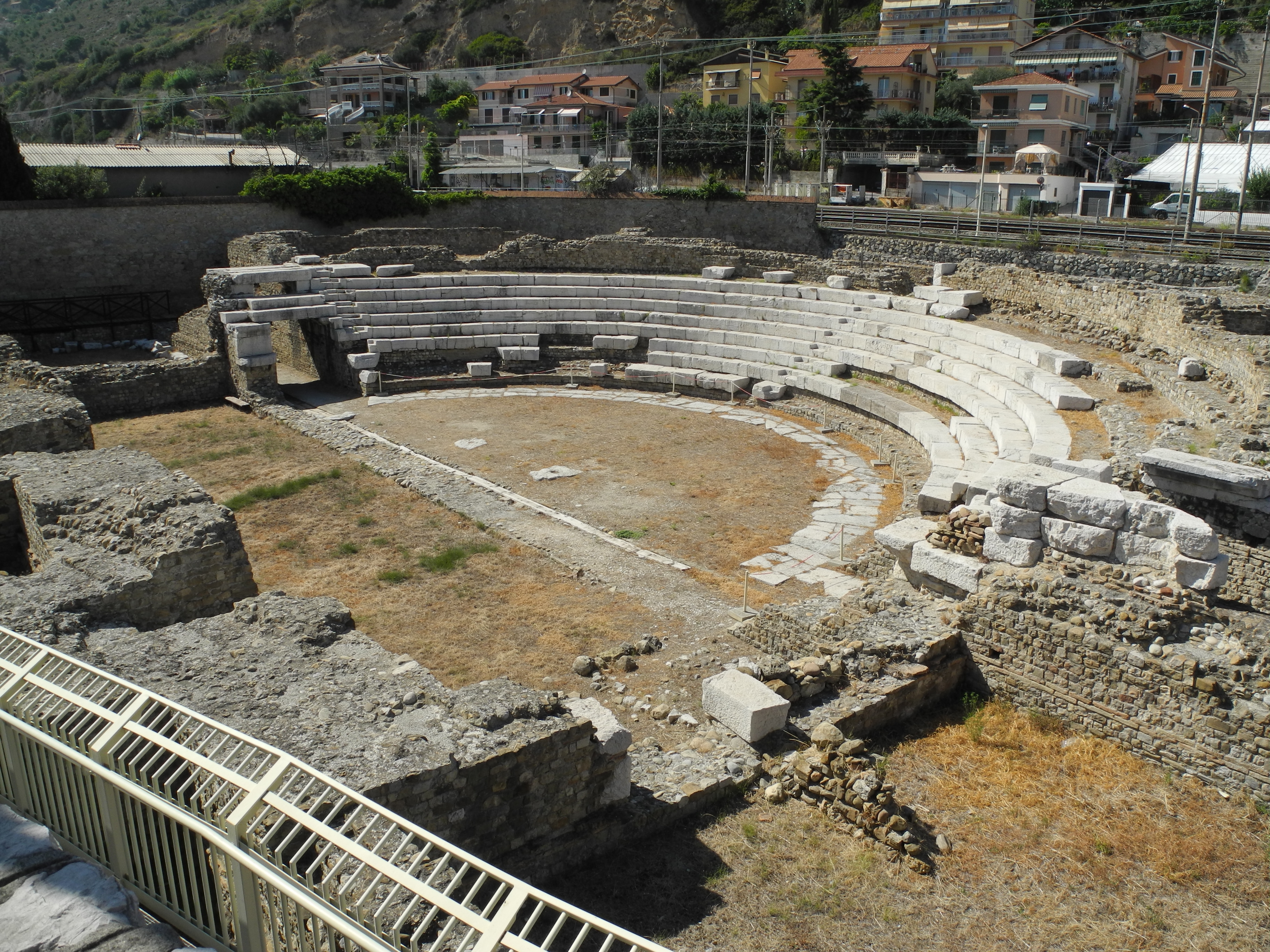
Roman theatre of Intimilium.

The Intemelli dwelled on the Mediterranean coast, east of Mont Agel around the town of Album Intimilium (modern Ventimiglia). The Barrington Atlas locates their territory east of the Vediantii, west of the Ingauni, and south of the Epanterii.

Their chief town was known as Album (or Albium) Intimilium, and later as Albintimilium. Mentioned as an oppidum by Pliny and as a municipium by Tacitus, the settlement was devastated by the supporters of Otho in 69 AD.

== History ==
In 180 BC, the consul Aulus Postumius Albinus, after vanquishing the nearby mountain Ligurians, sent ships to reconnoiter the shores of the Intemelii and Ingauni, which suggests that they were regarded as a potentially hostile tribe by Rome at that time.

In March 49 BC, during the Civil War, Caelius Rufus reported to his friend Cicero that Demetrius, a garrison-commander from Pompey's army, had been bribed by one faction among the Intimilii to murder the local notable and former host of Caesar named Domitius. The people of Intimilium took the arms and Caelius was forced to come there with some cohorts through the snow to restore order.

Be that as it may, what have I ever done to deserve the bad luck of this compulsory journey back to the Alps? The Intimilii are up in arms, for no very momentous reason: Demetrius, Bellienus' slave boy, being stationed there with a detachment of troops, was bribed by the opposite party to seize and strangle one Domitius, a notable of the district and a host of Caesar's. The people rushed to arms. Now I have to trudge there through the snow with [lac.] cohorts. You’ll remark that the Domitii are coming to grief all along the line. Well, I could wish our scion of Venus had shown as much spirit in dealing with your Domitius as Psecas' offspring showed with this one!

— Cicero 2001. Epistulae ad Familiares, 149 (VIII.15).
