= Cadenet =

- Commune
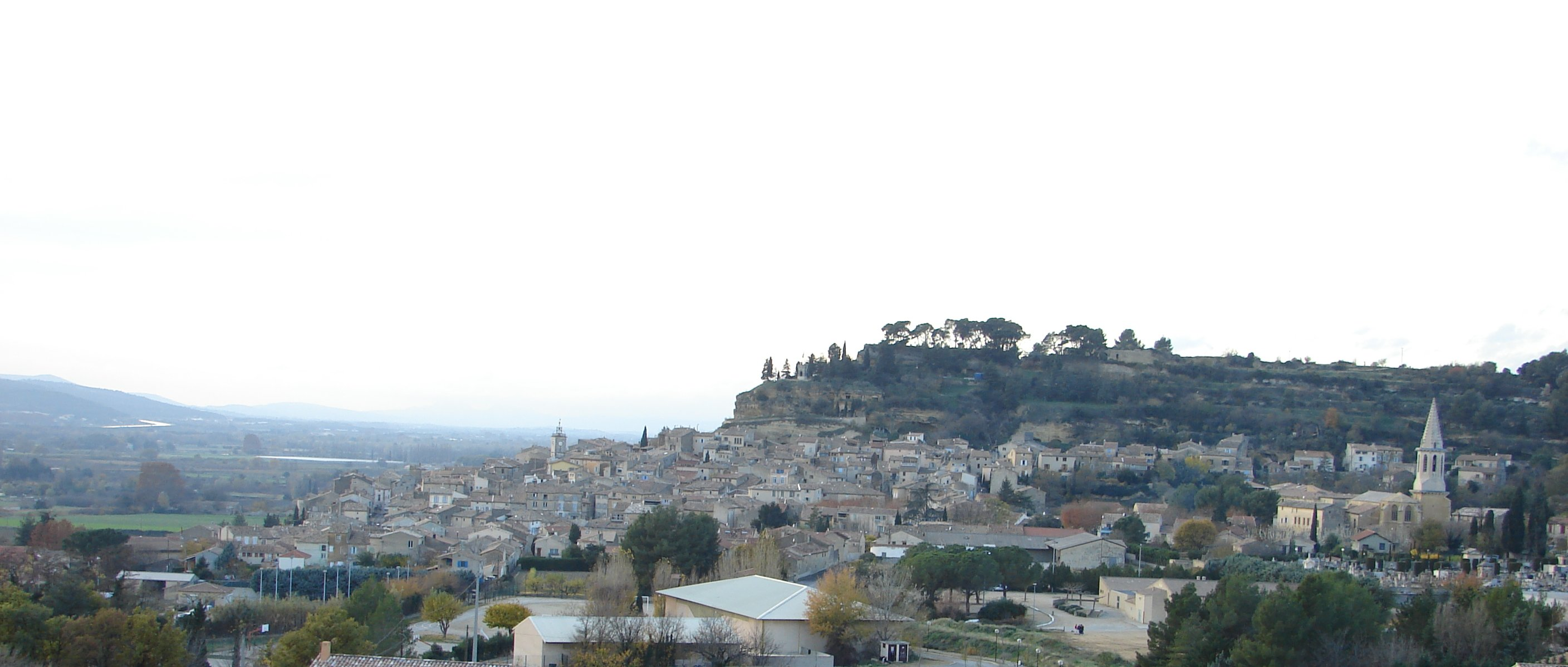
- View of Cadenet from the East

- Coat of arms
- Location of Cadenet
- Location within France Location within Provence-Alpes-Côte d'Azur
- Coordinates: 43°44′36″N 5°22′34″E
- Country: France
- Region: Provence-Alpes-Côte d'Azur
- Department: Vaucluse
- Arrondissement: Apt
- Canton: Cheval-Blanc

Government
  - Mayor (2020–2026): Jean-Marc Brabant
- Area^{1}: 25 km^{2} (9.7 sq mi)
- Elevation: 234 m (768 ft)
- Highest elevation: 376 m (1,234 ft)
- Lowest elevation: 147 m (482 ft)
- Population (2023): 4,363
  - Density: 170/km^{2} (450/sq mi)
- Time zone: UTC+01:00 (CET)
  - Summer (DST): UTC+02:00 (CEST)
- INSEE/Postal code: 84026 /84160
- ^{1} French Land Register data, which excludes lakes, ponds, glaciers > 1 km^{2} (0.386 sq mi or 247 acres) and river estuaries.

Cadenet (French pronunciation: [kadənɛ]) is a commune in the Vaucluse department in the Provence-Alpes-Côte d'Azur region in southeastern France.

== Geography ==
Cadenet is a village located on the southern slopes of the Luberon Massif, overlooking the valley of the Durance. It is 57 km southeast of Avignon, 59 km north of Marseille and 616 km as the crow flies from Paris.

=== Access ===
It is accessed from Lourmarin to the north by county (départemental) main road 943. Secondary county road 973 crosses the south of the village on an east–west axis and allows it to connect to Lauris to the west, and runs east to Villelaure and Pertuis. County roads 43, 59, 118 and 139 also pass through the town.

A railway runs through the town on an east–west axis across the plains at the south end of the village. This is the line of the Cheval-Blanc in Pertuis.

=== Relief and Geology ===
The village is situated on a hill overlooking the valley of the Durance, on the southern Luberon Massif, in mountainous terrain formed during the Early Cretaceous period. Several other hills lie to the east, including Castellar. The alluvial plains of the Durance lie to the south. The town lies on the perimeter of the Luberon Geological Nature Reserve because of the proximity to exceptional fossil sites.

== History ==
=== Jewish community ===
Like all places situated along the river Durance, Cadenet had a Jewish community in the Middle Ages. A document of the year 1283 states that this community, together with those of Aix-en-Provence, Saint-Maximin, Lambesc, Pertuis, Istres, Trets, and Lanson, was permitted to have a synagogue and a cemetery on paying an annual tax of two pounds of pepper to the archbishop of Aix.

In 1385 a remarkable lawsuit arose in Arles, relating to an alleged marriage. The plaintiff was Maestro Duran of Cadenet. In order to be revenged on Meirona, daughter of En Salves Cassin of Arles, who had refused him, Duran declared that he had married her in the presence of two witnesses, Vidal Abraham of Bourrin and Bonfilh or Bonfils Crégud. These witnesses were later convicted of perjury.

The case was taken in turn before the rabbinical colleges of Arles, Nîmes, Montpellier, and Perpignan, and in the last instance, upon the demand of Don Salemias Nasi of Valence, was submitted to R. Isaac ben Sheshet, who pronounced severe judgment against Duran and his fellow-conspirators, and bitterly reproached the community of Arles that it had not done its utmost to prevent such a scandal from becoming public.

A Jew, Mosson of Cadenet by name, lived at Carpentras in 1404; and two others, Salvet of Cadenet and Vidalon of Cadenet, were sheriffs of that community in 1460.

== Population ==
Historical population
Year	Pop.	±% p.a.
1968	2,401	—
1975	2,483	+0.48%
1982	2,640	+0.88%
1990	3,232	+2.56%
1999	3,883	+2.06%
2007	3,963	+0.26%
2012	4,134	+0.85%
2017	4,190	+0.27%
2023	4,363	+0.68%
Source: INSEE

Its inhabitants are called Cadenétiens in French.

== Twin towns ==
Cadenet is twinned with:

- Arcole, Italy
- Varvari-Myrtia, Greece

== See also ==
- Côtes du Luberon AOC
- Communes of the Vaucluse department
- Luberon

== Natives ==
Natives include the Orientalist composer Félicien-César David, the carpenter and Jacobin Joseph Sec, and Saint Elzéar of Sabran, Baron of Ansouis and Count of Ariano.
