= Nerusii =

Ligurian tribe

The Nerusii were a Ligurian tribe living in the Alpes Maritimae during the Iron Age.

== Name ==
They are mentioned as Nerusi by Pliny (1st c. AD).

Patrizia de Bernardo Stempel has proposed to interpret the name as Ner-usii ('the manly ones'), from the Proto-Indo-European root *ner- ('man').

The anthroponym Nerusius is attested at Magliano and at Rusellae (CIL XI 2619). The ethnonym has also been compared with the deity Nerius of Néris-les-Bains (Allier).

== Geography ==
The Nerusii appear near the end of the list of tribes on the Tropaeum Alpium, before the Velaunii and the Suetrii, without any precise geographical indication. Ptolemy, however, assigns their chief town as Vintium (Vence), which effectively defines the territory attributed to them as the area that later formed the civitas and then the diocese of Vence. The former boundaries of the diocese are well established: to the east it followed the Var from its mouth to its junction with the Estéron; to the west the Loup, up to its source on the Audibergue mountain; and to the north it ran along the crests of the Thorenc and the Cheiron mountains. These early medieval limits already corresponded to those of the civitas Vintiensium in the Roman period and, earlier, of the territory of the Nerusii.

== History ==
They are mentioned by Pliny the Elder as one of the Alpine tribes conquered by Rome in 16–15 BC, and whose name was engraved on the Tropaeum Alpium.
