= Pertuis =

- Commune
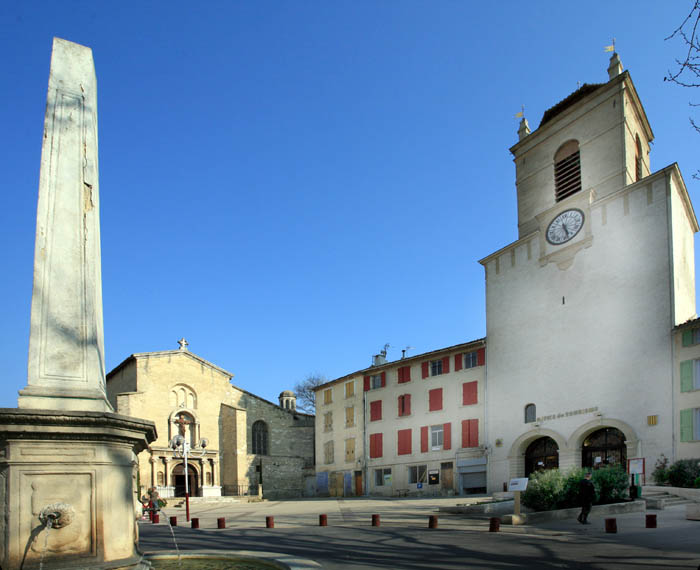
- The church and the tourist office in the town of Pertuis

- Flag Coat of arms
- Location of Pertuis
- Location within France Location within Provence-Alpes-Côte d'Azur
- Coordinates: 43°41′42″N 5°30′13″E
- Country: France
- Region: Provence-Alpes-Côte d'Azur
- Department: Vaucluse
- Arrondissement: Apt
- Canton: Pertuis
- Intercommunality: Aix-Marseille-Provence

Government
  - Mayor (2020–2026): Roger Pellenc
- Area^{1}: 66.23 km^{2} (25.57 sq mi)
- Elevation: 246 m (807 ft)
- Highest elevation: 472 m (1,549 ft)
- Lowest elevation: 171 m (561 ft)
- Population (2023): 19,548
  - Density: 295.2/km^{2} (764.4/sq mi)
- Time zone: UTC+01:00 (CET)
  - Summer (DST): UTC+02:00 (CEST)
- INSEE/Postal code: 84089 /84120
- ^{1} French Land Register data, which excludes lakes, ponds, glaciers > 1 km^{2} (0.386 sq mi or 247 acres) and river estuaries.

Pertuis (French pronunciation: [pɛʁtɥi]; Occitan: Pertús) is a commune in Vaucluse, a department in the southeastern Provence-Alpes-Côte d'Azur region of France, south of the Luberon.

== History ==
The Hôtel de Ville

Pertuis has existed since at least 981. The Hôtel de Ville was built as a private residence in about 1690.

== Population ==
The population has tripled since the 1960s.

Historical population

Year	Pop.	±% p.a.
1793	3,700	—
1800	4,000	+1.12%
1806	4,440	+1.75%
1821	4,616	+0.26%
1831	4,520	−0.21%
1836	4,470	−0.22%
1841	4,380	−0.41%
1846	4,487	+0.48%
1851	4,766	+1.21%
1856	4,959	+0.80%
1861	4,859	−0.41%
1866	4,839	−0.08%
1872	5,494	+2.14%
1876	5,649	+0.70%
1881	5,612	−0.13%
1886	5,484	−0.46%
1891	4,927	−2.12%
1896	4,910	−0.07%
1901	4,838	−0.30%

Year	Pop.	±% p.a.
1906	4,956	+0.48%
1911	4,973	+0.07%
1921	4,772	−0.41%
1926	5,030	+1.06%
1931	5,401	+1.43%
1936	5,229	−0.65%
1946	5,556	+0.61%
1954	5,621	+0.15%
1962	6,774	+2.36%
1968	8,355	+3.56%
1975	10,117	+2.77%
1982	12,430	+2.99%
1990	15,791	+3.04%
1999	17,833	+1.36%
2007	18,680	+0.58%
2012	19,141	+0.49%
2017	20,380	+1.26%
2023	19,548	−0.69%

Source: EHESS and INSEE (1968-2023)

== International relations ==
Pertuis is twinned with:

- Alton, Hampshire, England
- Herborn, Hesse, Germany
- Este, Veneto, Italy
- Utiel, Spain

== Notable people from Pertuis ==
- Victor de Riqueti, marquis de Mirabeau (1715–1789), economist
- Michèle Torr (1947-), singer
- Cyril Rool (1975-), footballer

== Gallery ==
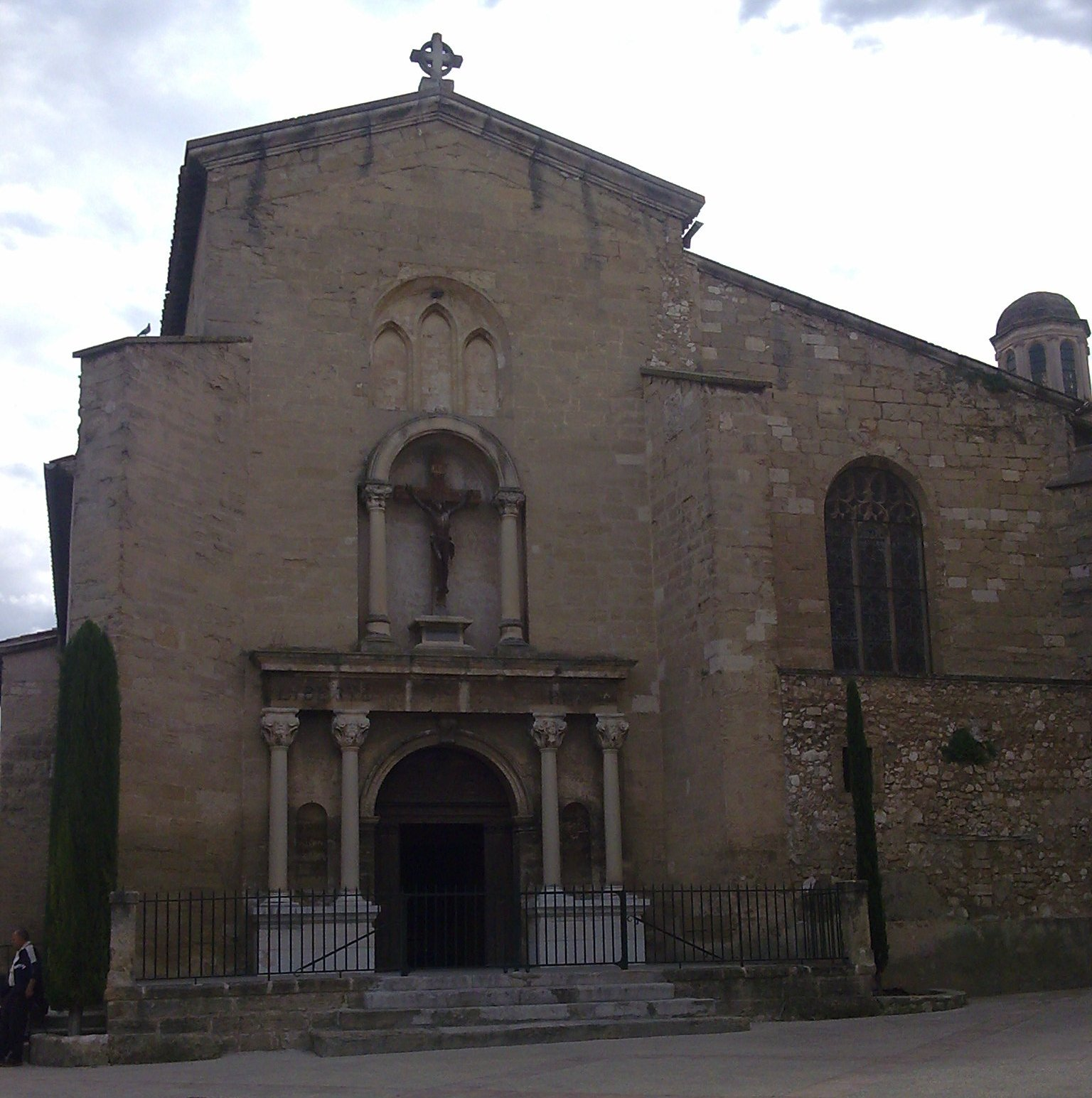
Église Saint-Nicolas

== See also ==
- Communes of the Vaucluse department
