= Avantici =

Gallic tribe

The Avantici (Gaulish: *Auanticoi) were a small Gallic tribe dwelling around present-day Gap, in the western part of the modern Hautes-Alpes department, during the Roman period.

== Name ==
They are only mentioned once as Avanticos (var. acanticos, aganticos) by Pliny (1st c. AD).

The ethnonym Avantici is a latinized form of the Gaulish *Auanticoi (sing. Auanticos), deriving from the stem auant- ('source') attached to the adjectival suffix -ico-. The stem does not appear to be Celtic. As the hydronymic lexicon is particularly resistant to name changes, auant- is probably a term of pre-Celtic Indo-European origin (cf. Latv. avuots 'source', Skr. avatá- 'well, cistern'), which eventually came to be adopted by the Celts; it may have made use of it in proper names only.

== Geography ==
=== Territory ===
The territory of the Avantici roughly corresponded to the later Gapençais region. It stretched between present-day La Roche-des-Arnauds (Ad Finem) and Le Fein (south of Chorges). To the south, they must have controlled the land immediately opposite Segustero (Sisteron), between the Durance and the Bès, as suggested by the name of the Vançon river. The Barrington Atlas locates their territory east of the Vocontii, north of the Edenates, west of the Caturiges, and south of the Tricorii. They were probably part of the Vocontian confederation.

=== Settlements ===
The pre-Roman chief town of the Avantici was probably the oppidum of the hill of Saint-Mens, located 1km southeast of Vapincum.

During the Roman period, their capital was known as Vapincum (modern Gap), a station on the route between the Rhône Valley and the Italian Peninsula. In 69 AD, the territory of the Avantici was transferred, along with that of the Bodiontici, to the province of Gallia Narbonensis by Galba. They probably belonged to the Alpes Maritimae or to the Alpes Cottiae prior to that event. During the Late Empire, Vapincum became the chief town of the civitas Vappencensium (var. uappin-) in Narbonensis Secunda, as documented by the Notitia Galliarum.
