= Sentii =

Gallic tribe

The Sentii (Gaulish: Sentioi) were a small Gallic tribe dwelling around present-day Senez, in southeastern France, during the Roman era.

== Name ==
They are mentioned as Σέντιοι (var. Σένποι) by Ptolemy (2nd c. AD).

The ethnic name Sentii is a latinized form of Gaulish Sentioi. It derives from the stem sentu- ('pathway') and can be interpreted as 'the people who live near the path', 'those who know the path', or as 'those who control the road'.

== Geography ==
The Sentii dwelled around their chief town, Sanitium (modern Senez). The settlement is not mentioned in ancient sources until the Notitia Galliarum (4th–6th centuries AD).

The Barrington Atlas locates their territory west of the Vergunni, north of the Suetrii, east of the Reii and Vocontii, and south of the Bodiontici. The area of their civitas corresponded mainly to the upper basin of the river Asse; it may have also included parts of the valley of the Verdon, further east.

== Economy ==
The economy of the area must have been rather poor in ancient times. The Sentii probably relied principally on pastoral activity, although the road crossing through Sanitium and Barrême may have helped trade.
