= Turi (Ligurian tribe) =

Ligurian tribe

The Turi (also Tyrii or Esturi) were a Ligurian tribe living in the Alpes Maritimae, around modern Borgo San Dalmazzo in the upper Stura valley, during the Iron Age and the Roman period.

== Name ==
They are mentioned as Turi and Esturi by Pliny (1st c. AD), and as Tyrii on the Baalbek inscription (90 AD).

The ethnonym Turi may be connected with the name of the Stura river (Sturia), as suggested by the variant Esturi mentioned by Pliny. This form could reflect an original Es-turi(i), built with a suffix -turi(i) also found in the ethnonyms Viturii (a people of the Genoa region), Eguiturii (upper Verdon valley), and Nemeturii (upper Verdon or Var valley).

An inscription from Heliopolis (modern Baalbek, Lebanon) mentions the Pedates Tyrii ('the Tyrii from Pedo'), where Pedates refers to the inhabitants of the town of Pedo and Tyrii designates the population of the territorial district for which Pedo was the centre. According to scholar Francisco Rubat Borel, the spelling Tyrii from the inscription is influenced by the nearby Phoenician city of Tyrus (modern Tyre).

== Geography ==
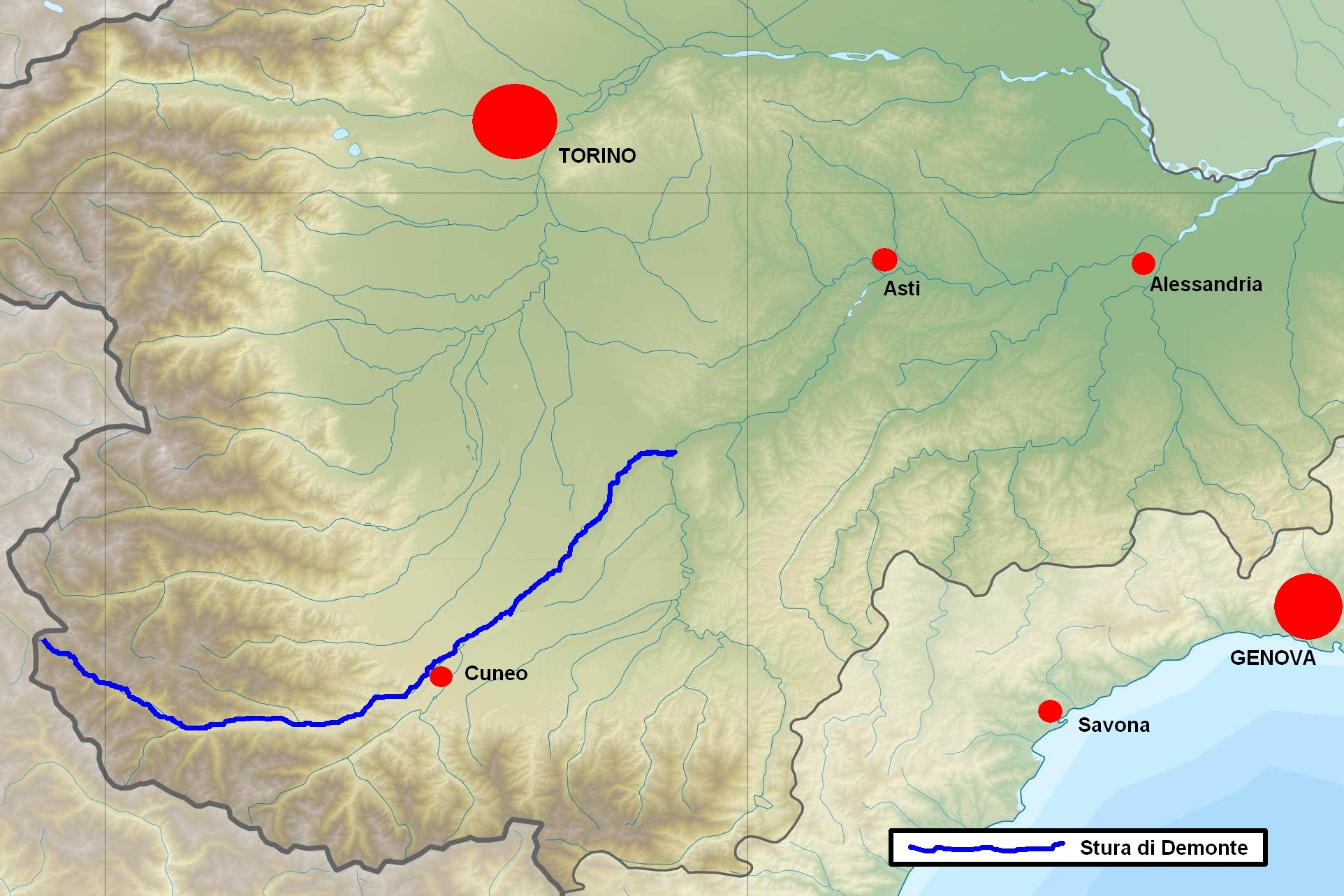
Location of the Stura river. The territory of the Turi was located in the upper valley.

The Turi were located in the upper valley of the Stura di Demonte, around the settlement of Pedo (modern Borgo San Dalmazzo).

Their pre-Roman chief town, named Pedo, was situated at the confluence of the Stura di Demonte and Gesso rivers. By the first century AD, the civitas of Pedo was attached to the province of Alpes Cottiae.

== History ==
Although officially under Roman authority, the Turi remained relatively independent and formed an autonomous civitas administratively attached to the Cottian province by the end of the first century AD.

The Baalbek inscription mentions that Sex. Attius Suburanus Aemilianus served around AD 90 as procurator of both the Alpes Cottiae and the Pedates Tyrii, which reflects the inclusion of the Stura di Demonte valley within the prefecture of Cottius.
