= Comani (tribe) =

Gallic group

The Comani were a Gallic tribe or the inhabitants of an eponymous town dwelling in the region of Massalia (modern Marseille) during the Iron Age.

== Name ==
They are mentioned as Comani by Pliny (1st c. AD) and by Ptolemy (2nd c. AD).

The ethnonym Comani may be compared with the personal name Comanus, which is based on the Gaulish prefix co- attached to -mānos (perhaps 'good, favourable'; cf. Welsh mawn-, Ogam Irish Manu).

== Geography ==
Comani is mentioned as an oppidum with Latin Rights by Pliny, and as a people located between the Avatici and the Deciates by Ptolemy. Historian Guy Barruol contends that the name Comani probably designated the inhabitants of this settlement rather than an ethnic group, and that Ptolemy's description may be erroneous since the territory he describes (between L'Estaque and the Massif de l'Esterel) was known to be populated by other peoples, namely the Segobrigii, Camactulici, and Suelteri.

According to philologist Javier de Hoz, it is possible that they were the descendants of the Segobrigii, or else that they were another tribe that supplanted them in this area. Barruol also notes that their name is possibly connected to Comanus, a king of the Segobrigii from the 6th century BCE.

According to Barruol, they were part of the Saluvian confederation.

== Bibliography ==
- Barruol, Guy (1969). Les Peuples préromains du Sud-Est de la Gaule: étude de géographie historique. E. de Boccard. OCLC 3279201.
- Delamarre, Xavier (2003). Dictionnaire de la langue gauloise: Une approche linguistique du vieux-celtique continental. Errance. ISBN 9782877723695.
- de Hoz, Javier (2005). "Ptolemy and the linguistic history of the Narbonensis". In de Hoz, Javier; Luján, Eugenio R.; Sims-Williams, Patrick (eds.). New approaches to Celtic place-names in Ptolemy's Geography. Ediciones Clásicas. pp. 173–188. ISBN 978-8478825721.
