= Euburiates =

Ligurian tribe

The Euburiates or Buriates were a Ligurian tribe living in the Alpes Maritimae in ancient times. They were subdued by the Roman proconsul Q. Baebius between 180 and 170 BC, after which their population was transferred into the plains, suggesting an original settlement in the nearby mountains.

== Name ==
They are only mentioned by Florus (1st c. AD). The manuscripts give the name as Buriates, emended by editors to Euburiates on the model of Pliny. Jordanes, who abridged Florus, also reads Buriates.

Alfred Holder compared the ethnic name to the gentilic Bur(r)ius and the cognomen Burrus, to which Schulze added the Italic Burrenius, Burredius and Burrienus. According to Giulia Petracco Sicardi, the suffix -ati- would presuppose an unattested place-name *burio-.

Some scholars have identified them with the Caburriates (variant Euburiates) mentioned by Pliny, although most editors instead treat them as two separate people.

== Geography ==
The Euburiates are known from a passage in Florus, who, summarising Livy's account of the Roman–Ligurian conflicts of the 2nd century BC, lists the Saluvii, Deciates, Oxybii, Euburiates, and Ingauni among the peoples subdued by Roman commanders. The order in which Florus lists these peoples (from west to east) places the Euburiates roughly between the territory of the Oxubii in the Estérel and that of the Ingauni around Albingaunum (Albenga) and Lucus Bormani.

Guy Barruol contends that the Euburiates likely lived in the mountains, close to the sea in the region of the Alpes Maritimae, since the proconsul Q. Baebius is said to have transferred their population "into the plain" (in plana deduxit) after their submission. He nonetheless regards their precise location as impossible to determine.

== History ==
According to archeologist Nino Lamboglia, the actions attributed by Florus to M. Fulvius refer to the campaign against the Salluvii in 125 BC and, by imprecise extension, to the Deciates and Oxybii, who had already been subdued in 154 BC. Those attributed to the consul Postumius concern the Ingauni (185–181 BC) and the Montani (180 BC, though not named in the text). Baebius's operations would therefore correspond to the subjugation of the Euburiates and fall within the years 180–170 BC.
