= Segobrigii =

Ligurian or Gallic tribe

The Segobrigii or Segobriges were a Celto-Ligurian people dwelling in the hinterland of the Greek colony of Massalia (modern Marseille) during the Iron Age.

They are mentioned in the founding myth of Massalia, recounted by the Greek philosopher Aristotle and by Pompeius Trogus, a Gallo-Roman writer who lived among the nearby Vocontii in the 1st century BC. Built around the historical founding of the city by Greek settlers ca. 600 BC, the legend tells how the daughter of the Segobrigian king Nannus chose a Phocaean sailor as her husband during her own wedding, the two of them eventually founding the colony of Massalia.

== Name ==
They are only mentioned once as Segobrigii by Pompeius Trogus (1st c. BC), in a text later summarized by the Roman writer Justin in the 3rd–4th century AD.

The ethnonym appears to be a Celtic compound derived from the stem sego- ('victory, force'). However, the meaning of the second element remains unclear. It could stem from brīgo- ('force, vigour'), or else from briga ('hill, hillfort'). The name Segobrigii has thus been translated as 'People of the mighty/victorious hill-fort', or as 'Strong and exalted people'.

== Geography ==
By the 6th century BC, the territory of the Segobrigii stretched from the Massif de l'Étoile to the Mediterranean coastline, south of the Salyes. It was gradually absorbed by the Greek colony of Massalia over the following centuries.

The only site testifying to a pre-600 BC occupation in Marseille is the oppidum of Baou de Saint-Marcel, at the outlet of the Huveaune valley, 7 km east of the Old Port of Marseille. The hills of the Marseille basin were also occupied during this period. Some scholars have proposed to identify the oppidum of Saint-Blaise (Saint-Mitre-les-Remparts) with the chief town of the Segobrigii. Although it is located 36 km north of Marseille, the settlement shows the presence of a Celtic wall from the end from the 7th century BC. In this view, this oppidum could be interpreted as the place where the Greeks and locals met before the foundation of Massalia further south.

== History ==
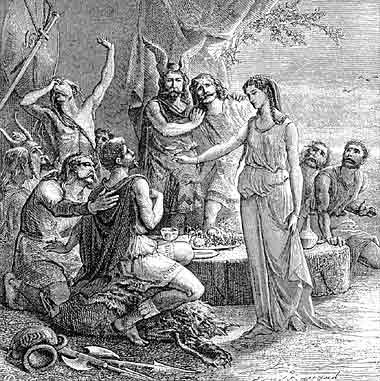
Gyptis meeting the Phocaeans in Histoire populaire de la France (1862–1866) by Victor Duruy

Around 600 BC, Greek settlers from the city of Phocaea, in western Anatolia, founded the colony of Massalia at the site of Lacydon, corresponding to the present-day Old Port of Marseille. According to the foundation myth of the city, the princess of the Segobrigii, daughter of the king Nannus, chose to marry a Greek settler from Phocaea. At the invitation of Nannus, the two of them established the colony of Massalia, near or within the territory of the Segobrigii. Massalia was initially limited to a trading post lacking inland possessions (locus condendae urbis). They were respected as foreigners bound by ties of hospitality with the local ruler, which implied that these indigenous people had freedom of movement within the colony and were welcomed during some religious festivals.

Nannus was succeeded by his son Comanus who, fearing the expansionist policy of the Phocaeans, gave up the hospitality relation established by his father and waged war on the Greek colony ca. 580 BC. According to a story recounted by Trogus, probably inspired by the tale of the Trojan Horse and other Greek motifs, (Note: According to scholar Marcel Meulder, those motifs are: "the climate of hostility between the natives (Gauls, Trojans, Iranians, Gabians, Tegetes, etc.) and the newcomers (Greeks from Phocaea, Turanians, Romans, Spartans, etc.), the penetration by trickery (disguised as partygoers, merchants, etc.) into the fortified city reputed to be impregnable, the use of cart(s) for celebrations and the transport of goods, and the apparent atmosphere of peace, or at least of non-aggression (the time of a truce or a feast).") Comanus tried to infiltrate Massalia with armed men hidden in carts during the festival of Floralia, but was eventually betrayed by one of his relatives who had fallen in love with a Greek. Comanus and 7,000 Segobrigii were killed, and the rest of the population was probably reduced to slavery or fled towards the hills that surrounded the colony. Segobrigian lands were likely annexed by the Greeks in the aftermath of this defeat.

After the capture of Phocaea by the Persians in 545 BC, a new wave of settlers fled towards the colony, which probably changed the demographic balance between the Greeks and natives.

Just before ca. 390–387 BC, a Segobrigian prince named Catumandus besieged the city, then reportedly abandoned his project after seeing the goddess Minerva in a dream and decided to make peace with the Massaliotes. In the aftermath of this event, learning that Rome had been seized by the Gauls at the Battle of the Allia, the Greeks gathered their possessions to help the Romans pay the ransom. Jean Brunel proposed that this tale, with the divine intervention and the parallel with the sack of Rome, may have created to hide the fact that Massalia had been taken by the Segobrigii and had to pay a tribute to them.

The subsequent disappearance of the Segobrigii from historical records is generally associated with the gradual incorporation of their territory into the Massaliote khôra, the territory outside the city proper. According to Javier de Hoz, it is possible that the Comani, who inhabited the inland territory to the north of Massalia, were the descendants of the Segobrigii, or else that they were another tribe that supplanted them in this area.

== Culture ==
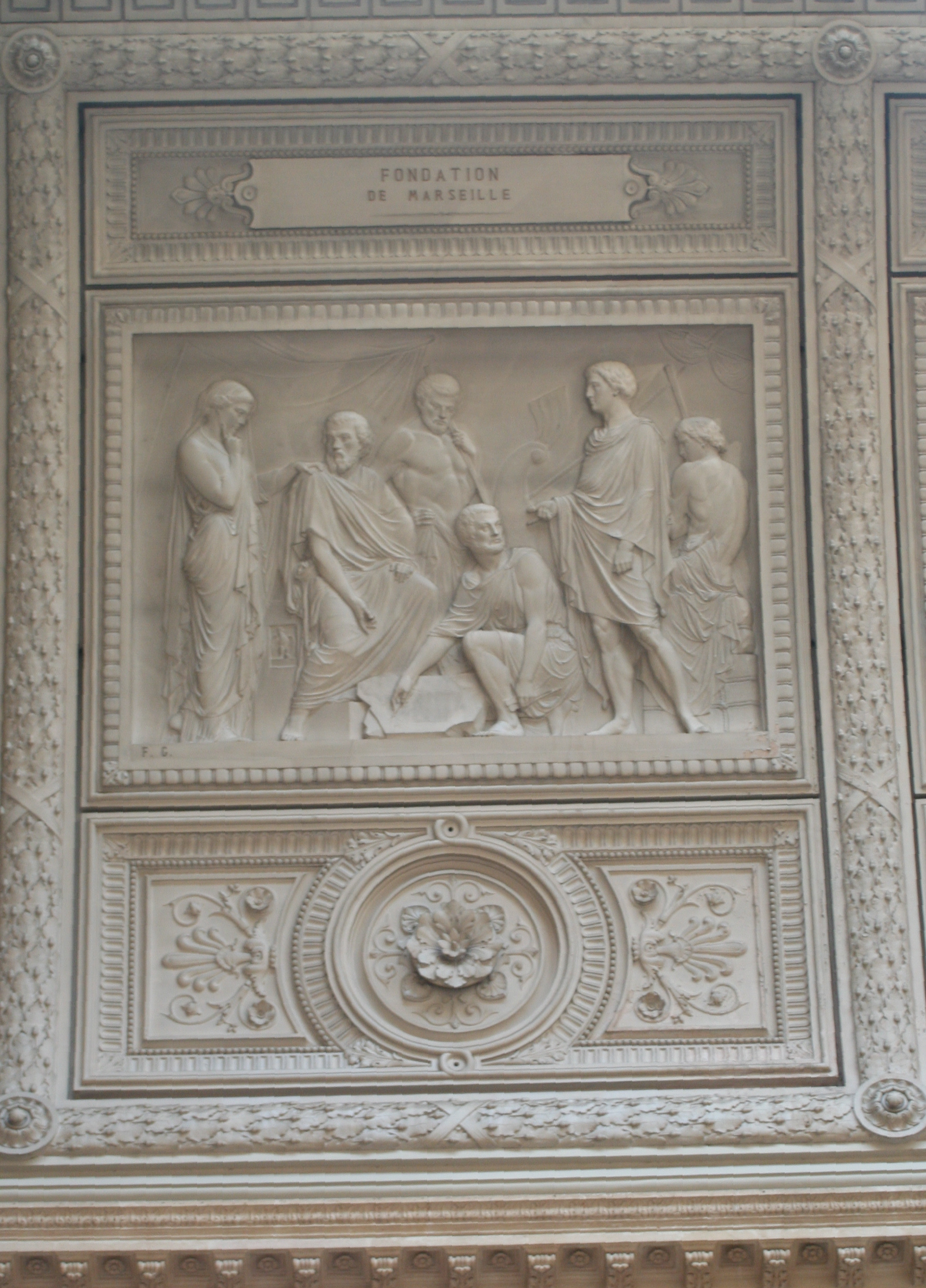
Fondation de Marseille by François Gilbert (1816–1891). Palais de la Bourse, Marseille

The Segobriges were identified as Ligurians by the oldest texts about the foundation of Massalia, but their ethnonym and the names of their chiefs are undoubtedly Celtic. Early Greek authors such as Hecataeus of Miletus (6th century BC) and Pseudo-Scylax (4th century BC) probably used 'Ligure' a generic name for such distant and partially known tribes, or merely as a geographic reference that had no relevance to their ethnicity. By the middle of the 2nd century BC, Polybius travelled to the region and wrote that the tribes dwelling in the Provençal inlands were Celtic.

In the time of King Tarquin a party of young Phocaean warriors, sailing to the mouth of the Tiber, entered into an alliance with the Romans. From there, sailing into the distant bays of Gaul, they founded Massilia among the Ligurians and the fierce tribes of the Gauls; and they did mighty deeds, whether in protecting themselves against the savagery of the Gauls or in provoking them to fight—having themselves first been provoked.

— Justin XLIII, 3 = Pompeius Trogus. Philippic Histories (transl. Rivet 1988, p. 10).

Although Trogus believed both Ligurians and Gauls to be in occupation at the time of the foundation, and Livy said that Gauls helped the Massaliotes found they colony against the hostile Celto-Ligurian Salyes, it is chronologically difficult to classify as 'Gauls' the Celtic tribes that had reached the Mediterranean shore of France by the end of the 7th century. According to Javier de Hoz, the Segobrigii were actually "primitive Celts" that were later assimilated into Gallic populations.

== Political organization ==
Both Trogus' and Aristotle's accounts of the legendary foundation of Massalia mention a peculiar custom whereby the daughter of the local king chooses her husband during her own wedding, by presenting him a bowl filled with water or wine. This motif, comparable to the Indic svayamvara ('personal choice'), is probably of Indo-European origin.

Euxenus happened to be visiting when this Nanos was celebrating his daughter's wedding, and he was invited to the feast. The wedding was organized as follows: After the meal, the girl had to come in and offer a bowl full of wine mixed with water to whichever suitor there she wanted, and whoever she gave it to would be her bridegroom. When the girl entered the room, she gave the bowl, either by accident or for some other reason, to Euxenus; her name was Petta.

— Athenaeus 2010, XIII, fr. 549 Rose = Aristotle. "Constitution of the Massaliotes".

It so happened that on that day the king was engaged in arranging the marriage of his daughter Gyptis: in accordance with the custom of the tribe, he was preparing to give her to be married to a son-in-law chosen at a banquet. So since all the suitors had been invited to the wedding, the Greek guests too were asked to the feast. Then the girl was brought in, and when she was asked by her father to offer water to the man she chose as her husband, she passed them all over and, turning to the Greeks, gave the water to Protis...

— Justin XLIII, 3 = Pompeius Trogus. Philippic Histories (transl. Rivet 1988, p. 10).

In Trogus' version, the Phocaean settlers do not integrate the Segobrigii into the Greek colony; the king Nannus provides him with a piece of land to found a city instead ("Protis ... was given the site for founding the city by his father-in-law"). This may suggest that Nannus controlled other territories near the coast, or that he had subjugated neighbouring tribes.

Archaeologist Dominique Garcia has proposed to interpret the Segobrigii as a "chieftaincy governed centrally (from the village of Nannus) by a hereditary authority (Nannus' lineage) extending matrilineally and matrilocally by swarming, with the creation of small village units consisting of a few dozen people placed under the authority of 'big men' (the kinglets of the text)." This tradition could have survived until the second part of the 6th century BC, when the coming of new settlers from Phocaea, including whole families, changed the demographic balance between settlers and natives, leading ultimately to the extinction of Nannus' descent-group and the disappearance of the Segobrigii from historical records.

== Primary sources ==
- Athenaeus (2010). The Learned Banqueters, Volume VI: Books 12-13.594b. Loeb Classical Library. Vol. 327. Translated by Olson, S. Douglas. Harvard University Press. ISBN 978-0674996397.

== Bibliography ==
- Arnaud, Pascal (2001). "Les ligures : la construction d'un concept géographique et ses étapes de l'époque archaïque à l'empire romain". Origines gentium. Ausonius Éditions. pp. 327–346. ISBN 978-2-35613-263-5.
- Barruol, Guy (1969). Les Peuples préromains du Sud-Est de la Gaule: étude de géographie historique. E. de Boccard. OCLC 3279201.
- Boissinot, Philippe (2005). "Le pays des Ségobriges. La protohistoire du Bassin de Marseille". In Rothé, Marie-Pierre; Tréziny, Henri (eds.). Carte Archéologique de la Gaule. Marseille et ses alentours. Les Editions de la MSH. ISBN 2-87754-095-2.
- Bouffier, Sophie; Garcia, Dominique (2012). "Greeks, Celts and Ligurians in South-East Gaul: Ethnicity and Archaeology". In Hermary, Antoine; Tsetskhladze, Gocha R. (eds.). From the pillars of Hercules to the footsteps of the Argonauts. Peeters. ISBN 978-90-429-2432-1.
- Bouffier, Sophie (2021). Les territoires de Marseille antique. Errance. ISBN 978-2-87772-848-5.
- Chausserie‑Laprée, Jean; Duval, Sandrine; Valenciano, Marie; Canut, Victor (2019). "Les fortifications de l'oppidum de Saint‑Blaise (Saint‑Mitre-les‑Remparts). Découvertes et approches nouvelles". Bulletin de correspondance hellénique. 143 (1): 361–389. doi:10.4000/bch.822. ISSN 0007-4217. S2CID 242199053.
- de Hoz, Javier (1999). "Did a *brigantinos exist in Continental Celtic?". In Meid, Wolfgang (ed.). Studia Celtica et Indogermanica. Archaeolingua. pp. 145–149. ISBN 978-9638046284.
- de Hoz, Javier (2005). "Ptolemy and the linguistic history of the Narbonensis". In de Hoz, Javier; Luján, Eugenio R.; Sims-Williams, Patrick (eds.). New approaches to Celtic place-names in Ptolemy's Geography. Ediciones Clásicas. pp. 173–188. ISBN 978-8478825721.
- Falileyev, Alexander (2010). Dictionary of Continental Celtic Place-names: A Celtic Companion to the Barrington Atlas of the Greek and Roman World. CMCS. ISBN 978-0955718236.
- Freeman, Philip (2006). "Greek and Roman accounts of the ancient Celts". In Koch, John T. (ed.). Celtic Culture: A Historical Encyclopedia. ABC-CLIO. ISBN 978-1-85109-440-0.
- Garcia, Dominique (2016). "Aristocrates et ploutocrates en Celtique méditerranéenne". In Belarte, Franco; Garcia, Dominique; Sanmartí, Joan (eds.). Les Estructures socials protohistòriques a la Gàl·lia i a Ibèria. Universitat de Barcelona. pp. 85–94. ISBN 978-84-936769-4-0.
- Meulder, Marcel (2004). "La prise de Marseille par les Ségobriges : un échec". Dialogues d'histoire ancienne. 30 (1): 11–32. doi:10.3406/dha.2004.2699.
- Pralon, Didier (1992). "La légende de la fondation de Marseille". Marseille grecque et la Gaule. Vol. 3. Études massaliètes. pp. 51–56. ISBN 978-2908774030.
- Py, Michel; Tréziny, Henri (2013). "Le territoire de Marseille grecque : réflexions et problèmes". In Bats, Michel (ed.). D'un monde à l'autre : Contacts et acculturation en Gaule méditerranéenne. Centre Jean Bérard. pp. 243–262. doi:10.4000/books.pcjb.5278. ISBN 978-2-38050-003-5.
- Rivet, A. L. F. (1988). Gallia Narbonensis: With a Chapter on Alpes Maritimae : Southern France in Roman Times. Batsford. ISBN 978-0-7134-5860-2.
- Talbert, Richard J. A. (2000). Barrington Atlas of the Greek and Roman World. Princeton University Press. ISBN 978-0691031699.
