= Ligauni =

Celto-Ligurian tribe

The Ligauni were a Celto-Ligurian tribe dwelling near the Mediterranean coast during the Iron Age and the Roman period.

== Name ==
They are mentioned as Ligaunorumque by Pliny (1st c. AD). A (colonia) in Liga in also attested in the Early Middle Ages (814 AD).

The ethnic name Ligauni is probably Celtic, stemming from an earlier *Ligamnī. It has been derived from the root līg- ('to strike'), with Ligauni as 'the beating ones', or from liga- ('mud, sediment, silt'). According to Patrizia de Bernardo Stempel, such linguistically Celtic tribal names suggest that a Celto-Ligurian dialect played an important role among the languages spoken in ancient Ligury.

== Geography ==
The Barrington Atlas locates their territory east of the Deciates, west of the Verucini, south of the Suetrii, and north of the Oxybii. According to historian Guy Barruol, they were part of the Saluvian confederation.
