= Oxybii =

Celto-Ligurian tribe

The Oxybii or Oxubii (Ancient Greek: Ὀξύβιοι) were a Celto-Ligurian tribe dwelling on the Mediterranean coast during the Iron Age and the Roman period.

According to historian Guy Barruol, the Oxybii were part of the Saluvian confederation.

== Name ==
They are mentioned as Oxubíōn (Ὀξυβίων) by Polybius (2nd c. BC) and Strabo (early 1st c. AD), and as Oxubi by Pliny (1st c. AD).

Patrizia de Bernardo Stempel has proposed to interpret the ethnic name Oxubii as 'the inhabitants of a high place' or else as 'the ox-slayers', from the Celtic stem oxso- ('ox') or uxso- ('high'). According to her, such linguistically Celtic tribal names suggest that a Celto-Ligurian dialect played an important role among the languages spoken in ancient Ligury.

== Geography ==
The Oxybii dwelled on the Mediterranean coast. The Barrington Atlas locates their territory east of the Suelteri and Verucini, and either east of the Deciates (near the Vediantii) or west of them (near the river Argens in the Massif de l'Esterel).

The exact location of the sea-port of the Oxybii, named Aegitna and located west of the river Apro, has been debated. The most popular propositions are Théoule (with the river Siagne), west of the Deciates, and Cagnes (with the river Cagne), east of the Deciates.

== History ==
In 155 BC, the Ligurians besieged the Massaliote colonies of Nicaea (Nice) and Antipolis (Antibes), which caused the Romans to send the legates Flaminius, Popilius Laenas and Lucius Pupius to the region. The Oxybii tried to prevent them from landing in their territory at Aegitna, but finding that Flaminius had already done so, they wounded him, killed two of his servants and drove the rest back into the sea. The Roman Senate, on hearing of the incident, dispatched an army under the consul Quintus Opimius. They first took Aegitna by assault, sold the inhabitants into slavery and sent the ringleaders to Rome. The Oxybii then collected a force to attack the Romans, and were eventually joined by the Deciates. After the Ligurian defeat, Quintus Opimius granted a great part of their territory to Massalia.

The Decietae now arrived in full force, thinking that they would take part in the battle side by side with the Oxybii, but arriving after all was over, received the fugitives into their ranks; they shortly afterward attacked the Romans with great spirit and resolution, but when worsted in the fight at once unconditionally surrendered themselves and their city. Opimius having overcome these tribes added as much of their territory as he thought fit to that of Marseilles, and compelled the Ligurians to give the Massaliots in future hostages for certain periods.

— Polybius 2010. Historíai, 39:10.
