= Nearchi =

Ancient tribe from Provence

The Nearchi were an ancient tribe dwelling in lower Provence. They are mentioned only once, by Avienus (4th century AD), who is thought to have drawn on a source dating to the 6th or 4th century BC, although some scholars have questioned the actual antiquity of Avienus's account.

Their ethnic identity remains uncertain. Early Greek writers described the region as part of 'Ligury' (Ligustica), but it lay close to the Greek colony of Massalia (founded ca. 600 BC), and both their ethnonym and the name of their chief settlement (Berginè) appear to be of Greek origin. One hypothesis suggests that the name Nearchi originally referred to a Greek-founded settlement that came to be applied to the nearby tribe.

== Name ==
They are mentioned as Nearchi by Rufus Festus Avienus (4th c. AD).

The ethnonym can be compared with the Ancient Greek personal name Néarkhos (Νέαρχος; Latin Nearchus). It may have originally referred to a local settlement founded in southern Gaul by a Greek explorer bearing this name, then applied to the nearby tribe.

== History ==
Crau region, west of Massalia (modern Marseille)

Historian Guy Barruol argues that the great age of the sources used by Avienus could make the Nearchi one of the earliest documented tribes of lower Provence along with the Salyes.

According to anthropologist Michael Dietler, however, even though Avienus' Ora Maritima, which was composed in the 4th century AD, "is thought to have been derived from a periplus written by a Massalian sailor of the sixth or fourth century BC", it "can hardly be used as evidence of the earlier presence of this name" since the text contains "many anachronisms and errors".

== Geography ==
From what can be inferred from Avienus' account, the Nearchi dwelled in lower Provence, near the Salyes and the Rhône river. Their territory was probably situated in the Crau region, between the Rhône delta and the Alpilles.

According to Barruol, they were part of the Salluvian confederation.

Berginè, the name of their chief town, has been traditionally identified with Ernaginum (near modern Tarascon), in the western part of the Alpilles. The name is most likely linked to Bergion, the eponymous local fortress of the mythical hero Bergion.

== Bibliography ==
- Barruol, Guy (1969). Les Peuples préromains du Sud-Est de la Gaule: étude de géographie historique. E. de Boccard. OCLC 3279201.
- Bats, Michel (2019). D'un monde à l'autre: Contacts et acculturation en Gaule méditerranéenne. Publications du Centre Jean Bérard. ISBN 978-2-38050-003-5.
- Dietler, Michael (2010). Archaeologies of Colonialism: Consumption, Entanglement, and Violence in Ancient Mediterranean France. University of California Press. ISBN 978-0-520-94794-8.
