= Caenicenses =

Inhabitants of an ancient city

The Caenicenses were the inhabitants of an ancient city (oppidum latinum) located in southern Gaul, attested in ancient sources but whose precise location and name remain uncertain.

== Name ==
They are mentioned as Caenicenses by Pliny (1st c. AD), as Kainikētai (Καενικῆται) on ancient coinage, and as Carnic[...] on an inscription from Arausio (modern Orange).

Writing in the 1st century AD, Pliny listed the Caenicenses among the oppida latina of Gallia Narbonensis. According to Guy Barruol, the term therefore not designate a tribe in the ethnic sense, but rather the inhabitants of a city, whose name is conventionally reconstructed as *Caenica or *Caenicum.

== Geography ==
The location of the city of *Caenica, associated with the Caenicenses, remains a matter of scholarly debate.

Guy Barruol (1969) proposed locating the settlement within the territory of the Avatici, near the Étang de Berre. The ethnonym has been connected with a hydronym recorded by Ptolemy, who mentions the 'mouths of the Kainos river' (Καινοῦ ποταμοῦ ἐκβολαί) between the Rhône delta and Massalia (modern Marseille). This Kainos has been identified with the outlet of the Étang de Caronte, which formerly connected the Étang de Berre to the sea near Martigues. The Caenicenses are also attested through silver coinage issued under the Greek name Kainikētai, found in Provence, particularly around the Étang de Berre. Barruol considered this distribution compatible with a localisation in this region, further observing that the coinage suggests a settlement sufficiently integrated into the Massaliote economic sphere to mint high-quality currency.

François Salviat (1977), however, argued that the findspots of these coins are too contingent to allow a secure determination of the city's location. On the basis of the Arausio cadastre inscription, Salviat suggested instead that the Caenicenses held land in the lower Durance region, possibly near Glanum (modern Saint-Rémy-de-Provence) and Ernaginum (modern Tarascon).

More recently, Gérard Chouquer and François Favory (1992) proposed locating the Caenicenses south and south-west of Eyguières, based on epigraphic evidence attesting the extension of the Orange cadastral network into a region possibly described as inhabited by this group. On this view, the settlement of *Canica may possibly correspond to the site of Saint-Pierre at Eyguières, although this identification remains uncertain, owing to the conjectural reading of one cadastral fragment.

== History ==
The Caenicenses are known through their coinage, issued under the Greek name Kainikētai (ΚΑΙΝΙΚΗΤΩΝ). These coins belong to the indigenous Greek-legend coinage of southern Gaul imitating Massaliote models and generally dated to the 2nd century BC. As with comparable series, this coinage is interpreted as having been issued by a city for commercial purposes rather than by a tribal group.

An additional attestation of the ethnonym appears in the cadastre of Arausio (modern Orange, Vaucluse), where a partially preserved inscription (Caenic[...]) records adjudicators of land parcels. This form has been interpreted as referring to the Caenicenses, comparable to the contemporaneous mention of the Ernaginenses (from the city of Ernaginum) on the same document. This suggests that cities could, for economic or administrative reasons, act as land adjudicators in colonies located at some distance from their own territory.
