= Anatilii =

Gallic tribe

The Anatilii were a Gallic tribe dwelling in the Alpilles region during the Iron Age.

== Name ==
The Anatilii are recorded by Pliny (1st c. AD), who gives their name in the Latin genitive case (Anatiliorum). Their name may be related to Gaulish anatia, meaning 'souls'.

== Geography ==
Pliny mentions a regio Anatiliorum situated between the Campi lapidei (the Crau) and the territories of Dexivates (between the Durance and Luberon) and Cavari (around present-day Avignon and Cavaillon). The Barrington Atlas locates their territory north of Libicii and Avatici, east of the Volcae Arecomici. According to historian Guy Barruol, they were part of the Saluvian confederation.

An oppidum with Latin Rights given by Pliny as Anatilia has been linked to the site of Vernègues, near Salon-de-Provence.

== Bibliography ==
- Barruol, Guy (1969). Les Peuples préromains du Sud-Est de la Gaule: étude de géographie historique. E. de Boccard. OCLC 3279201.
- Delamarre, Xavier (2003). Dictionnaire de la langue gauloise: Une approche linguistique du vieux-celtique continental. Errance. ISBN 9782877723695.
- Falileyev, Alexander (2010). Dictionary of Continental Celtic Place-names: A Celtic Companion to the Barrington Atlas of the Greek and Roman World. CMCS. ISBN 978-0955718236.
- Talbert, Richard J. A. (2000). Barrington Atlas of the Greek and Roman World. Princeton University Press. ISBN 978-0691031699.
