= Salluvii (Cisalpine Gaul) =

Ancient people of Cisalpine Gaul

The Salluvii (also Sallui) were a Gallic or Ligurian group recorded in Cisalpine Gaul during the Iron Age. They are known from two brief notices: one counts them among the peoples said to have migrated across the Alps into northern Italy, the other derives the Libui of Vercellae from the Sallui. They bear the same name as the Salyes of Transalpine Gaul, with which they have been identified. The sources class them at times as Gauls and at times as Ligurians.

== Name ==
They are recorded as Salluvii by Livy, who counts them among the peoples that crossed the Alps after the Cenomani and settled near the Ticinus, beside the Ligurian Laevi and together with the Libui. They are named again as Sallui by Pliny the Elder, who, following Cato, records that Vercellae of the Libici sprang ex Salluis ("from the Sallui").

The Cisalpine group is named only as Salluvii and Sallui, the same name as the transalpine Salyes (also Salluvii and Sállues). The Latin Salluvii has been explained as a latinisation of an earlier *Salues (Greek Σάλυες) borrowed before the 4th century BC.

The name was probably drawn from the people's own language, but its linguistic affiliation is disputed. Patrizia de Bernardo Stempel argues that it may be a Celtic rendering an earlier *Sl̥wes ('the own ones'), while Pierre-Yves Lambert holds the people to be Ligurian rather than Celtic, with a native form *Salwoi. It has also been compared with the Celtiberian Salluienses and the Turma Salluitana, and with the Italic personal names Salluvius, Sallubius, Salluius and Sallyius.

== Ethnic identity ==
Their name is the same as that of the Salyes (Latin Salluvii), the people of Transalpine Gaul around Aquae Sextiae (modern Aix-en-Provence). Philippe Boissinot and Mattia Balbo identify the Cisalpine Sallui and Livy's Salluvii with that Transalpine group. Michel Tarpin makes the same connection but holds that nothing reliable can be drawn from it. For him the overlapping names Saluvii, Sallui and Ligurians of Provence reflect the confusion of ancient writers, who could make sense of pre-conquest and post-conquest sources only through Roman categories of territory and subject peoples.

The group's ethnic affiliation is unsettled, and the sources class it at times as Gaulish and at times as Ligurian. The migration account groups the Salluvii with peoples crossing the Alps but places them next to the Laevi, a long-established Ligurian people, and the derivation of the Libui from the Ligurian Sallui likewise points to a Ligurian origin. Modern scholarship tends to treat the boundary between Celt and Ligurian in this part of the plain as fluid and to describe such mixed groups as Celto-Ligurian. Michel Tarpin goes further, treating the ethnic labels attached to these groups as constructions of the ancient geographers and of Roman territorial thinking rather than records of self-defined peoples. He regards the later attempts to fix the groups and their origins as an erudite game built on phonetic resemblances.

== Geography ==
In the migration account the Salluvii are placed in the western Transpadane plain, near the river Ticinus (modern Ticino), beside the Laevi. Their neighbours are the Laevi and the Libui, with the Marici on the northern bank of the Ticino and the Insubres further to the east.

Cato ties them more closely to Vercellae (modern Vercelli), whose people, the Libui, he says are derived from the Sallui. This sets the group in the country between the Ticino and the eastern Piedmontese plain.

== History ==
The Salluvii belong to the literary tradition of the Gaulish migrations into northern Italy, in which successive peoples are said to have crossed the Alps and taken the plain from the Etruscans. They are placed among the earlier arrivals, after the Insubres and the Cenomani, settling beside the Laevi together with the Libui.

The chronology of these migrations is disputed. The tradition sets their beginning in the reign of Tarquinius Priscus, while modern reconstructions spread the process over a longer span and tie its later phase to the sack of Rome, dated variously to about 390 or 386 BC. Michel Tarpin treats this migration tradition as a Roman literary construction rather than a record of events. It rests almost entirely on Livy, and although inscriptions attest a Celtic presence south of the Alps, the archaeology of the western Po plain shows no violent invasion of the kind the tradition describes.

The group is also bound up with the origin of the Libui of Vercellae, who in the ancient tradition are derived from the Salluvii. (Note: In the migration list, the Libui and the Salluvii are two distinct groups settling near the Laevi. In the notice on the origin of Vercellae, the Libui are instead an offshoot of the Salluvii.) This notice comes from Pliny's account of the Transpadane towns. Michel Tarpin reads that account as a summary of Cato's Origines, an early source independent of the Livian migration narrative. Mattia Balbo notes that the sources class the Libui and their associates at times as Gauls and at times as Ligurians. He reads this variation as a sign of an ancient debate over their origin. A Ligurian ancestry counted as older and more easily assimilated, and the claim to it accompanied the growing integration of these communities with Rome from the early 2nd century BC. The Libui themselves probably submitted to Rome about 196 BC, when a Roman army intervened against the Boi, then raiding their territory and that of the Laevi.

The Salluvii do not appear as an independent actor in the surviving record and are not mentioned after the migration tradition.
