= Libici (Cisalpine Gaul) =

Celto-Ligurian people of Cisalpine Gaul

The Libici (also Libicii or Libui) were a Celto-Ligurian people of Cisalpine Gaul who lived on the left bank of the upper Padus (the Po), in the region corresponding to modern Piedmont, in northern Italy, during the Iron Age and the Roman period. Their chief town was Vercellae (modern Vercelli). They have been regarded as a branch of the Ligurian Salyes that settled in the Po valley during the migrations of the 5th century BC, and have been identified with the homonymous people of the Rhône delta, the Libui.

== Name ==
The people of Vercellae are recorded as Lebékioi (Λεβέκιοι) by Polybius, as Libici (variant lyb-) by Pliny, and as Libikō̃n (Λιβικῶν) by Ptolemy. They are commonly identified with the Libui of Livy's account of the 5th-century migrations.

The form Libikoi has been derived by Patrizia de Bernardo Stempel from an earlier *lub^{h}ikoi ('the loving ones'), from the Gaulish word lubi ('love'), with assimilation of the pretonic vowel (u...i > i...i). Falileyev observes, however, that the u is retained in comparable names, which leaves the derivation uncertain.

== Geography ==
The Libici occupied the left bank of the upper Padus (Po), around their chief town Vercellae, which lay on the Sesia (ancient Sesites), a right-bank tributary of the Po. Their territory adjoined that of the Ligurian Laevi, settled toward Ticinum (Pavia) not far from the river, so that the two peoples lay close together in the upper valley. An earlier tradition placed them, less precisely, near the sources of the Po. To the east lay the Vertamocorii around Novaria and the Insubres toward Mediolanum (Milan).

== History ==
=== Origins ===
Guy Barruol regards the Libici as a branch of the Ligurian Salyes that crossed the Alps from Provence and settled in the Po plain in the 5th century BC, moving east at the same time as the Salyes and after the Cenomani. On this view the Cisalpine Libici and the homonymous people of the Rhône delta, the Libii associated with the "Libic mouths" (ora Libica) of the river in the Camargue, are one and the same Ligurian stock, the eastern group being a branch that migrated.

The classification of the people was already disputed in antiquity, some authors counting them among the Celts and others among the Ligurians. Tradition derived the creation of their chief town, Vercellae, from the Salluvii.

=== Roman period ===
The plain near Vercellae is traditionally identified with the Campi Raudii, the site of the battle in which Marius destroyed the Cimbri in 101 BC, though its exact location is disputed. After the grant of Latin rights (ius Latii) to the region in 89 BC, those who held local magistracies obtained Roman citizenship, and Vercellae became a self-governing town (municipium) enrolled in the tribus Aniensis.

A bilingual Latin and Gaulish boundary stone found at Vercelli in 1960 records the gift by a local notable, Acisius Argantocomaterecus, of an open public ground (campus) declared "common to gods and men" (communis deis et hominibus) to the community. Generally dated to the 1st century BC and linked to the grant of Latin rights, it gives Latin the principal place while preserving a Gaulish text, and attests the survival of the indigenous language and personal names. The donor's second name, argantocomaterecus, built on the Gaulish word for silver, has been read either as a pre-Roman office connected with the administration of silver or as a personal surname.

Archaeological remains at Vercellae itself are scarce, but weapon burials in the nearby cemeteries of Borgovercelli and Vinzaglio, dated to about 225–175 BC, attest a warrior aristocracy whose funerary display persisted into the 1st century BC. Local self-representation changed under Roman rule: by the Principate, inhabitants of Vercellae serving in the praetorian and urban cohorts identified themselves as citizens of Vercellae rather than as Libici or Gauls.
