= Tritolli =

Gallic tribe

The Tritolli were a Gallic tribe dwelling in lower Provence, south of the Durance river, during the Iron Age.

== Name ==
The Tritolli are solely attested by Pliny as Tritollorum (var. tritull-, tricoll-) in the 1st century AD.

The meaning of the Gaulish name Tritolli remains obscure. The first element is probably the prefix tri- ('three'), but the second component is difficult to interpret.

== Geography ==
Pliny describes the territory of the Tritolli as located between the Tricores (near the Mediterranean Sea) and the Vocontii (north of the Durance). They may have lived in the mountainous region of Saint-Maximin, Barjols, and Rians, to the east of the Salyes, although strong evidence is lacking.

According to history Guy Barruol, they were part of the Salluvian confederation.

== Bibliography ==
- Barruol, Guy (1969). Les Peuples préromains du Sud-Est de la Gaule: étude de géographie historique. E. de Boccard. OCLC 3279201.
- Falileyev, Alexander (2010). Dictionary of Continental Celtic Place-names: A Celtic Companion to the Barrington Atlas of the Greek and Roman World. CMCS. ISBN 978-0955718236.
