= Deciates =

Ligurian tribe

The Deciates (Δεκιήταις) were a Ligurian tribe dwelling near on the Mediterranean coast, around present-day Antibes, during the Iron Age and the Roman era.

According to historian Guy Barruol, they were part of the Saluvian confederation.

== Name ==
They are mentioned as Dekiḗtais (Δεκιήταις) by Polybius (2nd c. BC), as Deciates by Pliny (1st c. AD), and as Dekiatíōn (Δεκιατίων) by Ptolemy (2nd c. AD). A regio Deciatium is also attested by Pliny (1st c. AD), and an oppidum Deciatum is documented by Pomponius Mela (mid-1st c. AD).

The meaning of the name Deciates remains obscure. According to Javier de Hoz, an Indo-European etymology, from the root *dek̑-, is possible, and the suffix -ates may be evidence of a Celtic transmission, "but the whole name does not seem to be Celtic. In this case I would accept a classification as 'restricted Ligurian' because of the people's geographical location."

== Geography ==
The Deciates dwelled on the Mediterranean coast, west of the river Loup, around the Massaliote colony of Antipolis (modern Antibes). Their territory was located south of the Nerusii, southeast of the Ligauni, and either east or west of the Oxybii.

The exact location of the oppidum Deciatum (or Dekieton) remains uncertain. It is possible that it was not a separate place between Nicaea and Antipolis, but simply a name for Antipolis itself.

The coastal Greek colony of Antipolis (modern Antibes), founded in their territory in the mid-3rd century BC, was probably a Graecization of the original name given by the Ligurians to the place, despite the literal Greek meaning of 'city opposite'. This does not necessarily imply that it had been the main centre of the Deciates, and Barruol has proposed to identify the site of Grasse as their chief town.

== History ==
In 154 BC, the Ligurians besieged the Massaliote colonies of Nicaea (Nice) and Antipolis. Upon a request from Massalia, and after a Roman legate Flaminius had been injured by the Oxybii, the Roman Senate sent the consul Quintus Opimius to pacify the region. The latter defeated the Deciates and the Oxybii at Aegitna, then handed over a great part of their territory to Massalia.

The Decietae now arrived in full force, thinking that they would take part in the battle side by side with the Oxybii, but arriving after all was over, received the fugitives into their ranks; they shortly afterward attacked the Romans with great spirit and resolution, but when worsted in the fight at once unconditionally surrendered themselves and their city. Opimius having overcome these tribes added as much of their territory as he thought fit to that of Marseilles, and compelled the Ligurians to give the Massaliots in future hostages for certain periods.

— Polybius 2010. Historíai, 39:10.
