= Bormani =

Ancient tribe

The Bormani or Bormanici were an ancient tribe living near modern Bormes-les-Mimosas (Var, Southeastern France) during the Roman period.

== Name ==
They are mentioned as Bormani by Pliny (1st c. AD), and probably as Bormanici on an inscription.

The ethnic name Bormani may be formed with the suffix -ano- attached to the Celtic god of healing springs Bormanus, itself from Proto-Indo-European *bʰerw- ('boil, brew').

They have been identified with the Bormanici, mentioned on a dedication to Caligula (37–41 AD) found at Solliès-Toucas (Var). The suffix -ici is the Latinized form of -ii, and was a commonly used ending in the formation of ethnonyms in southeastern Gaul and the Alps.

The toponym Bormes-les-Mimosas, attested as Borma in 1056 AD, derives from the tribal name. It has further been compared to the toponym Lucus Bormani (Antonine Itinerary), located in Liguria between Albingaunum (now Albenga) and Albintimilium (now Ventimiglia).

== Geography ==
Pliny cites the Bormani as living between Aetea and the Comani. Their territory was located in the region lying between the Toulonnais Mountains and the western part of the Massif des Maures, north of the Gulf of Saint-Tropez.

It remains uncertain whether their oppidum was located within the territory of Bormes-les-Mimosas. Although two Iron Age settlements occupied into the Roman period are known there (at Notre-Dame-de-Constance and at a coastal site between Cap de Léoube and L'Estagnol), neither has produced archaeological evidence allowing the identification of an oppidum latinum.
