= Salluvii =

The ancient name Salluvii can refer to:

- Salluvii (Narbonensis), an ancient people from the area of modern Aix-en-Provence (southeastern France)
- Salluvii (Cisalpine Gaul), an ancient tribe from the area of modern Vercelli (northern Italy)
