= Tricores =

Gallic tribe

The Tricores were a Gallic tribe dwelling near the Mediterranean Sea, between the Rhône river and Massalia (modern Marseille), during the Iron Age.

== Name ==
The Tricores are solely attested by Pliny as Tricorium in the 1st century AD. They must be distinguished from the Tricorii of the Drac river valley.

The Gaulish name Tricores probably derives from the prefix tri- ('three') attached to corio- ('army').

== Geography ==
Pliny describes the territory of the Tricores as located between the Mediterranean Sea to the south and the Tritolli to the north, and between the Rhône river to the west and Massalia to the east. The region of L'Estaque and Vitrolles, to the south and southeast of the Étang de Berre, is a potential candidate.

According to history Guy Barruol, they were part of the Salluvian confederation.

== Bibliography ==
- Barruol, Guy (1969). Les Peuples préromains du Sud-Est de la Gaule: étude de géographie historique. E. de Boccard. OCLC 3279201.
- Falileyev, Alexander (2010). Dictionary of Continental Celtic Place-names: A Celtic Companion to the Barrington Atlas of the Greek and Roman World. CMCS. ISBN 978-0955718236.
