= Gaius Sextius Calvinus =

2nd-century BCE Roman politician and general, consul in 124 BCE

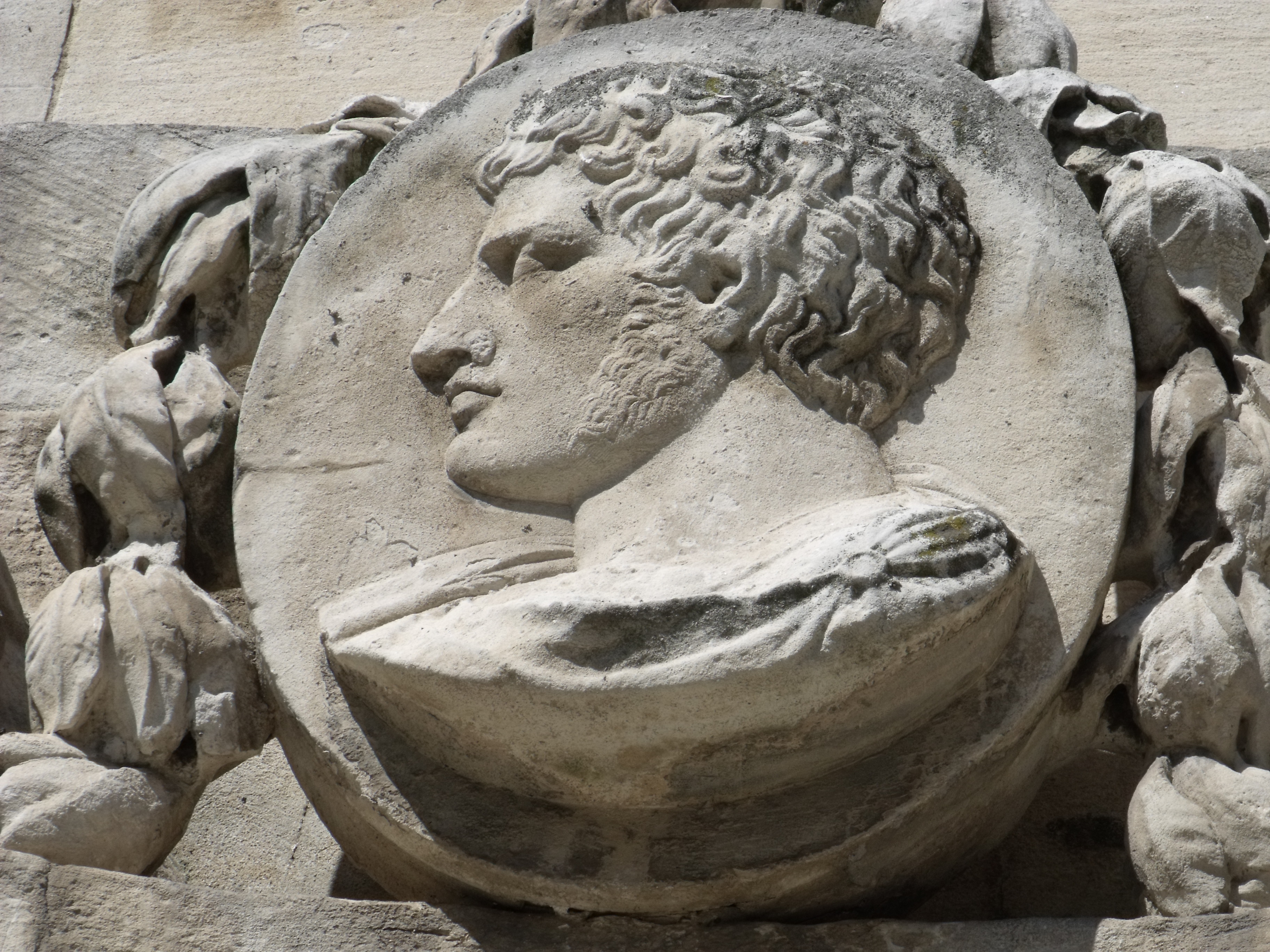
Portrait of Gaius Sextius Calvinus (Fountain of Preachers, Aix-en-Provence).

Gaius Sextius Calvinus was a consul of the Roman Republic in 124 BC. During his consulship, he joined M. Fulvius Flaccus in waging war against the Ligures, Saluvii, and Vocontii in Transalpine Gaul. He continued as proconsul in Gaul for 123–122. He had held office as praetor no later than 127.

Sextius is most noted for giving his name to Aquae Sextiae, "the Baths of Sextius," a site of thermal springs that is in modern-day Aix-en-Provence. There he established a garrison (castellum) below the Saluvian oppidum of Entremont.

Sextius played a significant role in the military operations, concluded by Domitius Ahenobarbus and Fabius Maximus around 120 BC, that led to the annexation of Transalpine Gaul as a Roman province. He and Fulvius Flaccus were able to create a mile-wide line of communication linking the territory of longtime Roman ally Massilia (present-day Marseille) to Cisalpine Gaul, already under Roman control. He was given a triumph for victories over the three Gallic nations in 122.

== Ara Calvini ==
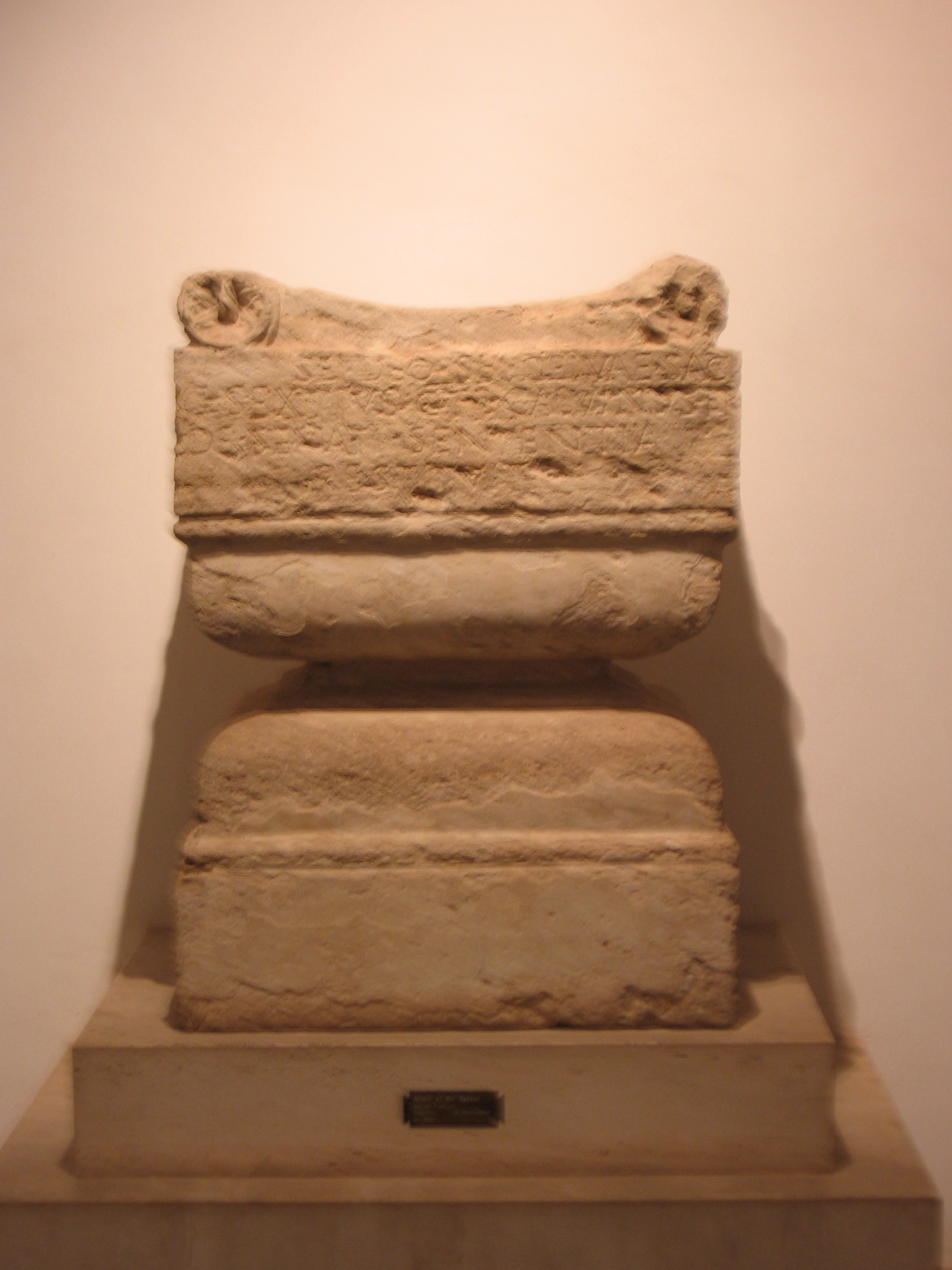
The Ara Calvini in the Palatine Hill Museum

Around 92 BC, a C. Sextius Calvinus of praetorian rank restored an altar dedicated to sei deo sei divae ("whichever god or goddess"). Although most often identified as the son of the consul of 124 BC, the elder Sextius is believed by E. Badian to have been responsible for the inscription.

The small altar was found near Sant'Anastasia on the lower west part of the Palatine Hill in 1829. Made of travertine, it has the hourglass shape that came into use in Rome around the time of the Second Punic War. The Ara Calvini ("Altar of Calvinus"), sometimes called the Ara Dei Ignoti ("Altar of the Unknown God"), is in the collections of the Antiquario Palatino (Palatine Hill Museum).

== See also ==
- Sextia gens
- School of the Sextii

== Sources ==
- Diodorus Siculus 34.23
- Cicero, Epistulae ad familiares 7.2.9
- Livy, Periocha 61
- Velleius Paterculus 1.15.4
- Strabo 4.1.5
- Acta Triumphalia for 122 BC (Degrassi p. 82f., 560)
- Eutropius 4.22

Political offices
Preceded by Marcus Plautius Hypsaeus, and Marcus Fulvius Flaccus	Consul of the Roman Republic; 124 BC with Gaius Cassius Longinus	Succeeded by Quintus Caecilius Metellus Balearicus, and Titus Quinctius Flamininus
