= Libui (Narbonensis) =

Celto-Ligurian tribe

The Libui (or Libicii, Libii) were a Celto-Ligurian tribe living of in the Rhône delta (Camargue) in southern Gaul during Iron Age. They have been identified with the Libici, who settled in the Po plain in Cisalpine Gaul following migrations in the 5th century BC.

== Name ==
They are mentioned as Lebékioi (Λεβέκιοι) by Polybius (2nd c. BC), Libui by Livy (late 1st c. BC), Libii and Libiciorum by Pliny (1st c. AD), and as Libikō̃n (Λιβικῶν) by Ptolemy (2nd c. AD).

The form Libikoi has been derived by Patrizia de Bernardo Stempel from an earlier *lub^{h}ikoi ('the loving ones'), from the Gaulish word lubi ('love'), with assimilation of the pretonic vowel (u...i > i...i). Alexander Falileyev observes, however, that the u is retained in comparable names, which leaves the derivation uncertain.

== Geography ==
The Libui lived around the two 'Libic mouths' (ora Libica) of the Rhône mentioned by Pliny, a designation corresponding to the western branch of the delta (the Petit-Rhône) and thus to the Camargue region. The Barrington Atlas locates their territory west of the Anatilii and Avatici, south of the Volcae Arecomici and Cavari. According to historian Guy Barruol, they were part of the Saluvian confederation.

An oppidum with Latin Rights given by Pliny as Libii was probably the name of their chief town.

== History ==
Livy writes that groups of Libui and Salyes settled in the Po plain, near the Ligurian Laevi on the banks of the Ticino, at the time of major Celtic incursions during the 5th century BC. This group of Libici settled around Vercellae. On this view the Cisalpine Libici and the Libui from the Rhône delta are one and the same people, the eastern group being a branch that migrated from Provence.
