= Marcus Fulvius Flaccus (consul 125 BC) =

2nd-century BCE Roman politician and general, ally of the Gracchi

- Died: 121 BC; Rome
- Occupations: Politician and soldier
- Office: III vir agris dandis assignandis (130–121 BC); Consul (125 BC); Plebeian tribune (122 BC)
- Military career
- Rank: Consul and proconsul
- Provinces: Transalpine Gaul (125 – 123 BC)

Marcus Fulvius Flaccus (died 121 BC) was a Roman senator and an ally of the Gracchi. He served as consul in 125 BC and as plebeian tribune in 122 BC.

== Biography ==
Flaccus had become one of the three men for the assignment of agricultural lands that was established by Tiberius Gracchus' lex agraria by 130 BC; he retained the post until his death. In this role, he attacked Scipio Aemilianus' attempts – at the instigation of the allies themselves – to transfer the jurisdiction over boundary disputes from the commission to the consuls. He served as praetor some time before 128 BC.

As a solution to the problem of land division among the allied cities, Flaccus proposed to give Roman citizenship to individual Italian allies in order to obtain lands, thereby introducing a question that vexed Roman politics for many years. Elected consul in 125 BC on this programme, he proposed bills to grant the Italians citizenship and right of appeal. Valerius Maximus, writing in the first century, indicts Flaccus with outrageous and haughty behaviour when he apparently refused to answer summons of the senate or attend senate meetings "to show his contempt for the prestige of that entire distinguished order". The senate, however, dispatched him to Transalpine Gaul to assist Massalia (modern Marseille) against Salluvian attacks, partially to stall his domestic legislative programme.

He was prorogued as proconsul in Transalpine Gaul through to 123 BC. Beyond the internal political conflict, the Roman objective in southern Gaul was to ensure the safety of the trading route between the Iberian Peninsula and Italy, which was threatened by the Ligurian tribes around Massalia. Livy's account suggests that Flaccus may have travelled across the Alps (presumably by Mont Genèvre and the Durance valley) rather than by the coast, possibly fighting the Vocontii east of the Rhône Valley before reaching the territory of the Salluvii. At any rate, Flaccus' victory was not decisive, and another consul, Gaius Sextius Calvinus, was sent the following year to subdue the local tribes. Flaccus became the first to defeat the transalpine Ligurians in war, and returned in 123 BC to Rome and celebrated a triumph.

In 122 BC, he became a plebeian tribune to assist Gaius Gracchus – Gaius had been tribune since the previous year, having been elected for 123, – in implementing a lightly-modified version of his policy of citizenship for Italians. This version would have granted those with Latin rights – the most important rights were intermarriage and access to Roman courts – full voting citizenship. Appian reports that he left the city during his tribunate to support African colonisation plans; Plutarch, however, places him in Rome throughout to oppose Marcus Livius Drusus (a political opponent and then-fellow tribune). The Italian citizenship bill, however, was defeated: the ancient sources name two leading opponents: Gaius Fannius and Drusus. Fannius, in a fragment of "his famous speech on the subject", said,

I suppose you imagine that, if you give citizenship to the Latins, you will still have a place in the assembly in which you are standing, and will participate in the games and festivals. Don't you realise that they will swamp everything?

Early in 121 BC, Flaccus joined Gaius Gracchus in protesting the repeal of a law – to establish a colony at Carthage – by an ally in their tribunate the previous year. When the protests became violent, he and Gaius were summoned to the senate but refused to attend. Lucius Opimius was then empowered by the senate, in the first senatus consultum ultimum, to suppress the protests by force. In response, Flaccus and Gaius armed their followers and seized portions of the Aventine Hill. Refusing to negotiate, Opimius' forces demanded that the leaders surrender themselves to the senate's judgement, and thence attacked; in the ensuing fight, Flaccus and his sons were killed.

== Legacy ==
Cicero in his dialogue with Brutus, describes Flaccus as "scholarly"; Badian notes in the Oxford Classical Dictionary (2012) that his helps to correct "the hostile picture in Plutarch" that describes him as "violent drunkard initiating Gracchus' rebellion".

Flaccus had at least two sons: the elder son – possibly of the same name – and a younger son – possibly named Quintus – were both killed during Lucius Opimius' suppression of the Gracchan uprising.

Political offices
Preceded by Marcus Aemilius Lepidus, and Lucius Aurelius Orestes	Consul of the Roman Republic; 125 BC with Marcus Plautius Hypsaeus	Succeeded by Gaius Cassius Longinus, and Gaius Sextius Calvinus
