= Quintus Opimius (consul) =

2nd century BC Roman politician

Quintus Opimius was a Roman politician in the second century BC.

== Family ==
He was a member of gens Opimia. His son Lucius Opimius was consul in 121 BC.

== Career ==
In 154 BC, he was elected consul together with Lucius Postumius Albinus as his colleague. He successfully defended the allied city of Massilia against the Ligurians, receiving a triumph. His colleague Postumius Albinus died while serving as a consul, being succeeded by Manius Acilius Glabrio.
