= Camactulici =

Gallic tribe

The Camactulici were a Gallic tribe dwelling around modern Toulon during the Iron Age.

== Name ==
The Camactulici are solely attested by Pliny as Camactulicorum in the 1st century AD.

== Geography ==
Pliny describes the territory of the Camactulici as located near Citharista (La Ciotat) and the Suelteri. They appear to have lived in the region of modern Toulon, their territory corresponding to the later pagus Tolonensis of the Early Middle Ages and the Diocese of Toulon.

According to history Guy Barruol, they were part of the Salluvian confederation.

== Bibliography ==
- Barruol, Guy (1969). Les Peuples préromains du Sud-Est de la Gaule: étude de géographie historique. E. de Boccard. OCLC 3279201.
