= Entremont (oppidum) =

Human settlement in FranceArcheological site in France

Coordinates: 43.552222°N 5.4391666°E

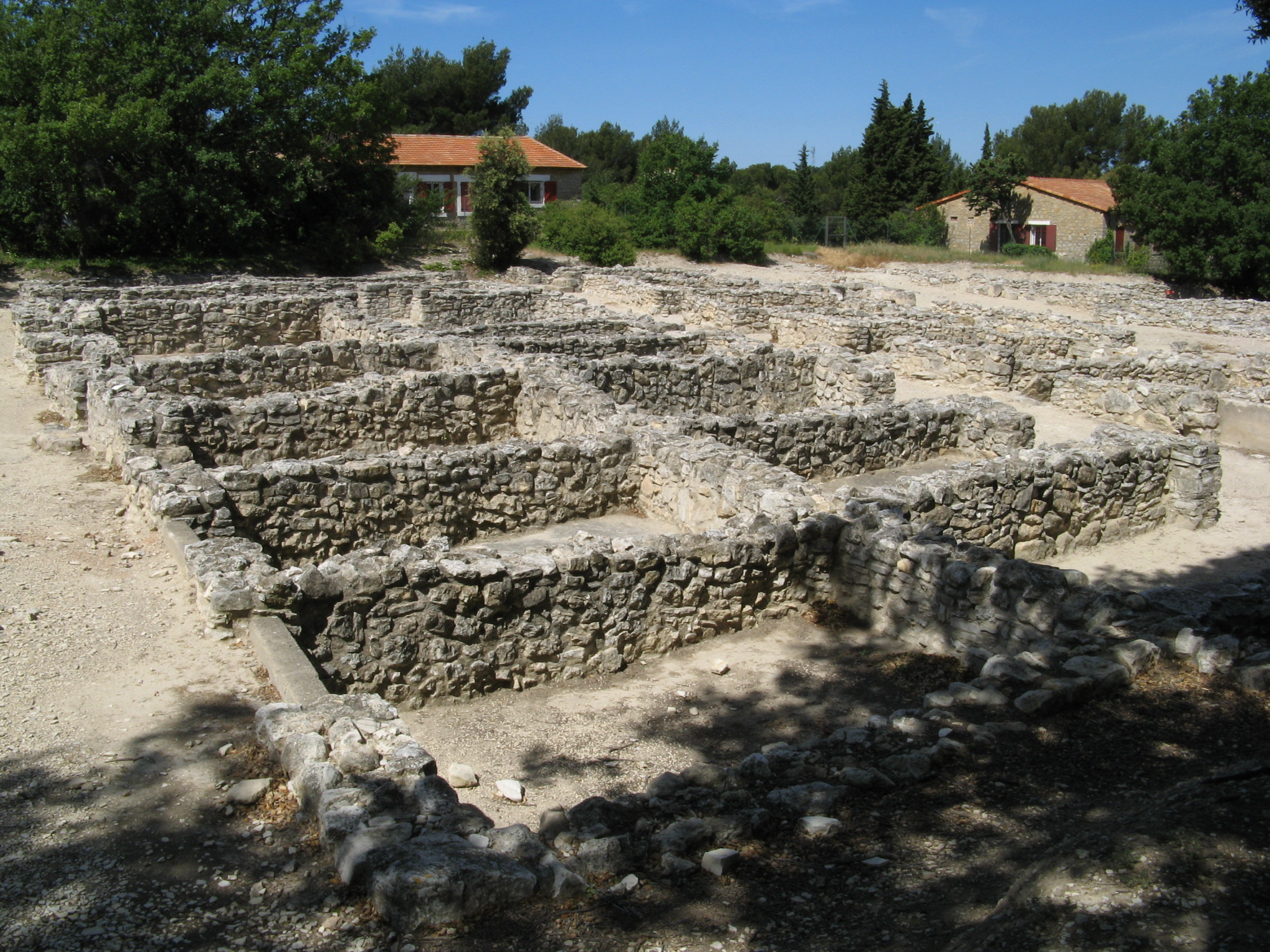
View of the site (Habitat 1, ville haute)

Entremont is a 3.5-hectare (8.6-acre) archaeological site three kilometres from Aix-en-Provence at the extreme south of the Puyricard plateau. In antiquity, the oppidum at Entremont was the capital of the Celtic-Ligurian confederation of Salyes. It was settled between 180 and 170 B.C., somewhat later than the inhabitation of other oppida, such as Saint-Blaise (7th to 2nd centuries B.C.). The site was abandoned when it was taken by the Romans in 123 B.C. and replaced by Aquae Sextiae (modern Aix-en-Provence), a new Roman city founded at the foot of the plateau. By 90 B.C., the former oppidum was completely uninhabited.

The site contains two distinct areas of settlement surrounded by ramparts. Archaeologist Fernand Benoit named the older area, on the summit, "Ville Haute", and the lower "Ville Basse". Subsequently, it was recognised that the latter was an enlargement of the former, and they are now labelled "Habitat 1" and "Habitat 2", respectively.

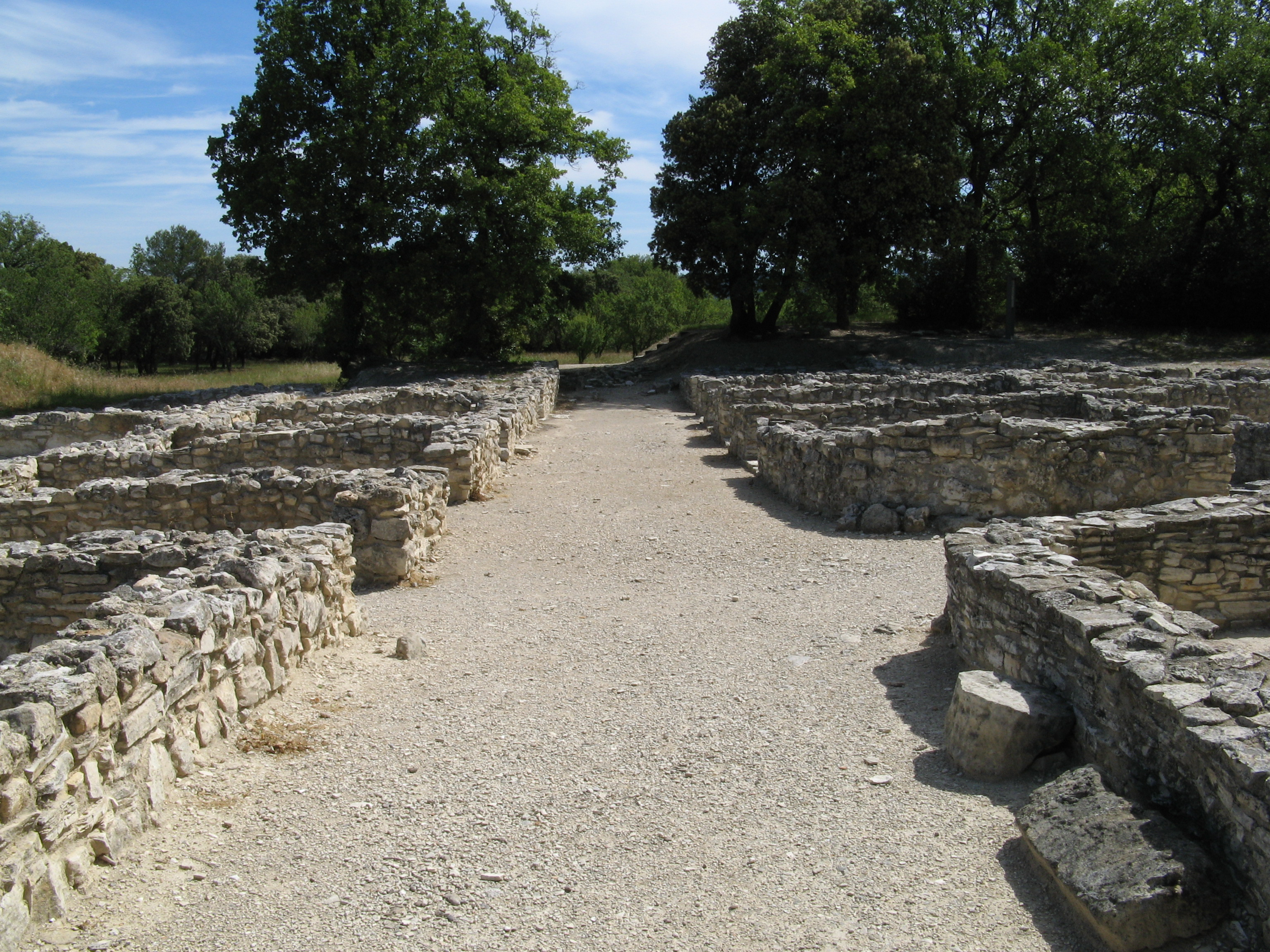
Habitat 1 (ville haute)

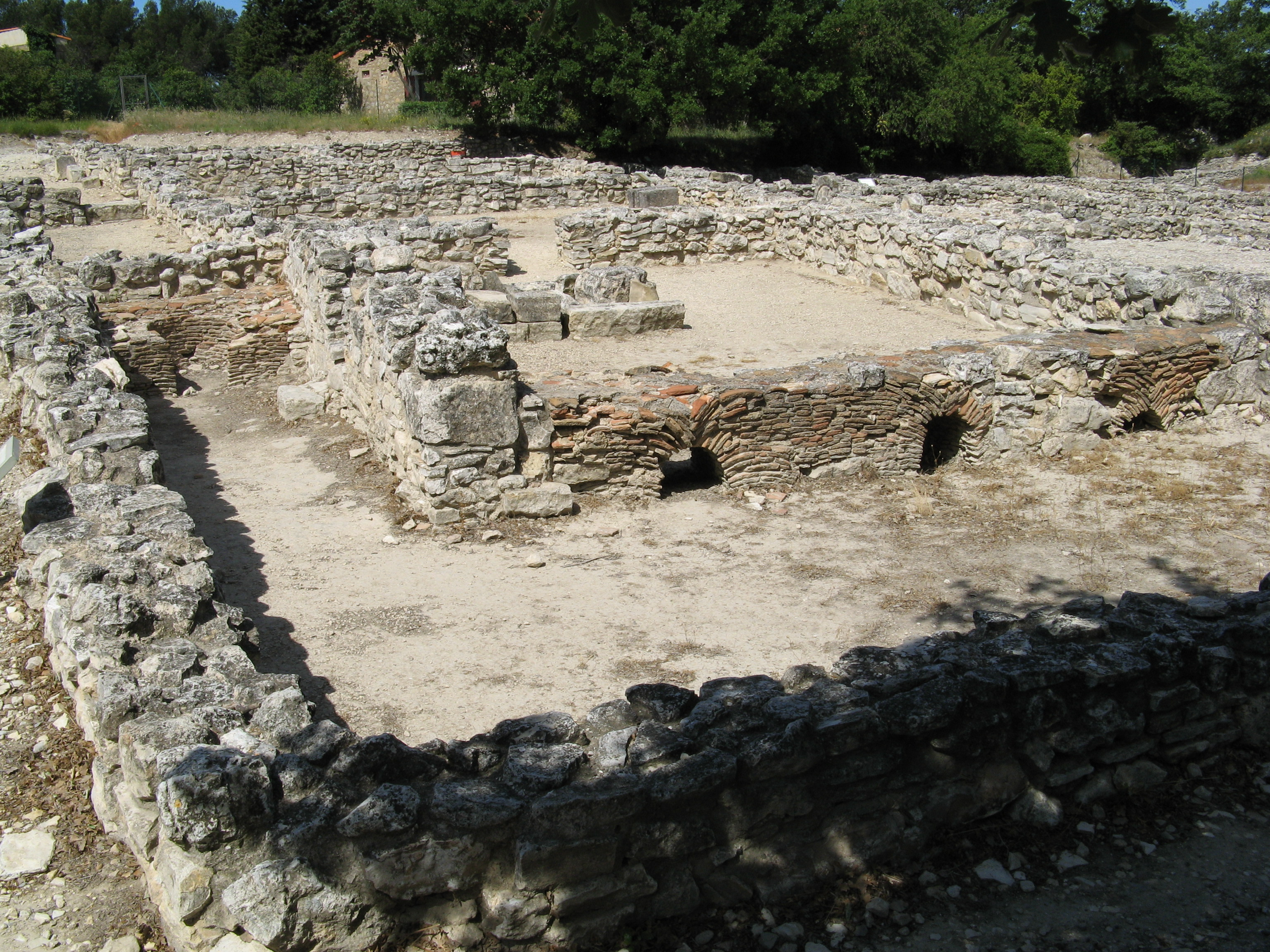
Habitat 2 (ville basse)

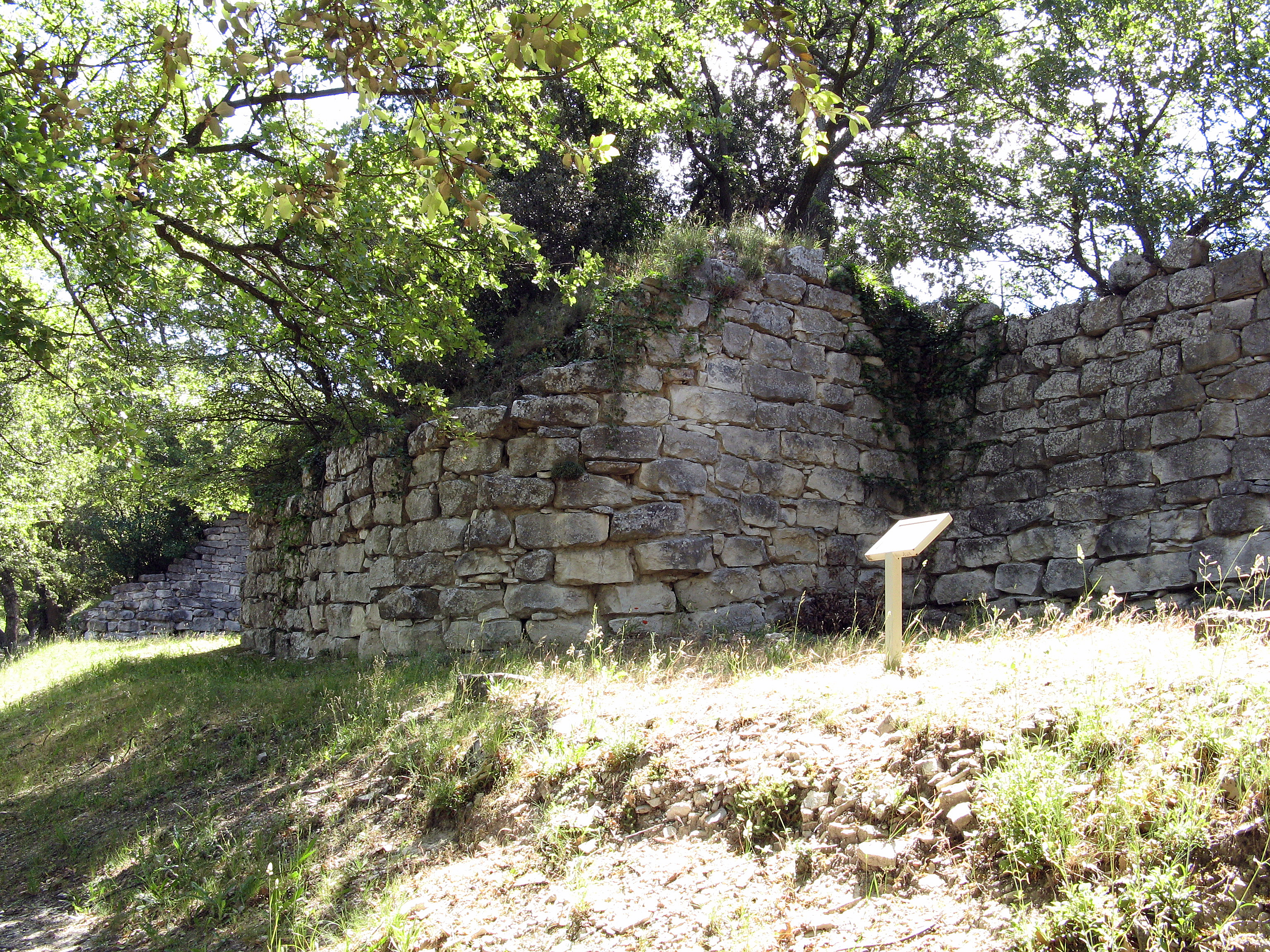
Fortification wall of Habitat 2 (ville basse)

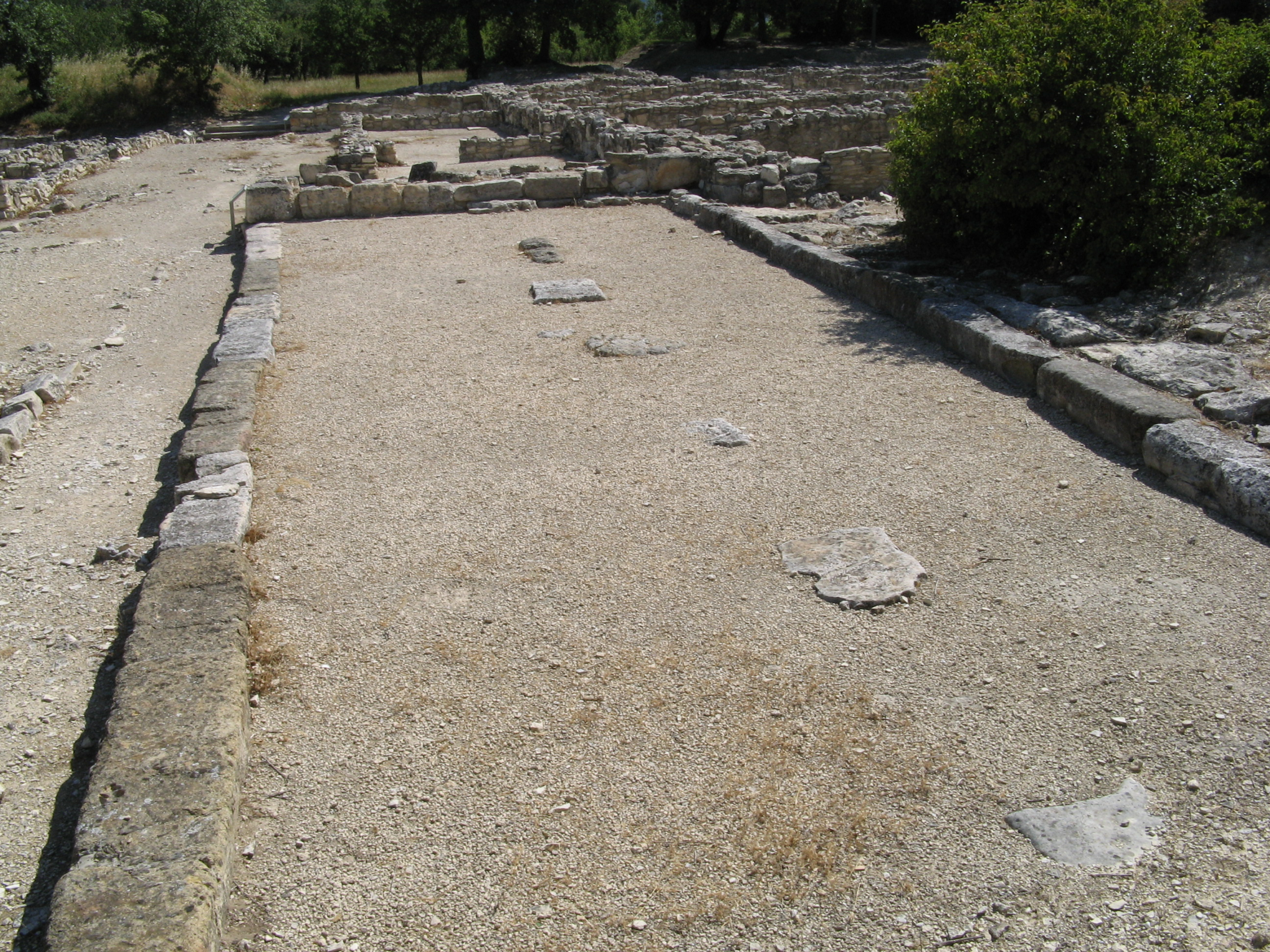
"Portico of the Skulls"

== Sculpture ==
Excavations at Entremont in the 1940s produced a large collection of fragmentary pre-Roman sculpture, most of which is now in the Musée Granet in Aix-en-Provence. The largest group of fragments consists of the heads and torsos of several male figures, usually interpreted as heroized warriors, depicted in a seated position with their legs folded beneath them and one hand resting on the severed head of an enemy. Heads and other pieces of a smaller number of female figures are also preserved, as are fragments of horses. Blocks from the architectural setting in which the figures were displayed are decorated with reliefs of additional severed heads and skull-shaped recesses, as well as horsemen and other figures. The sculptures were all carved from a fine-grained local limestone, and some of the fragments preserve traces of the original paint.

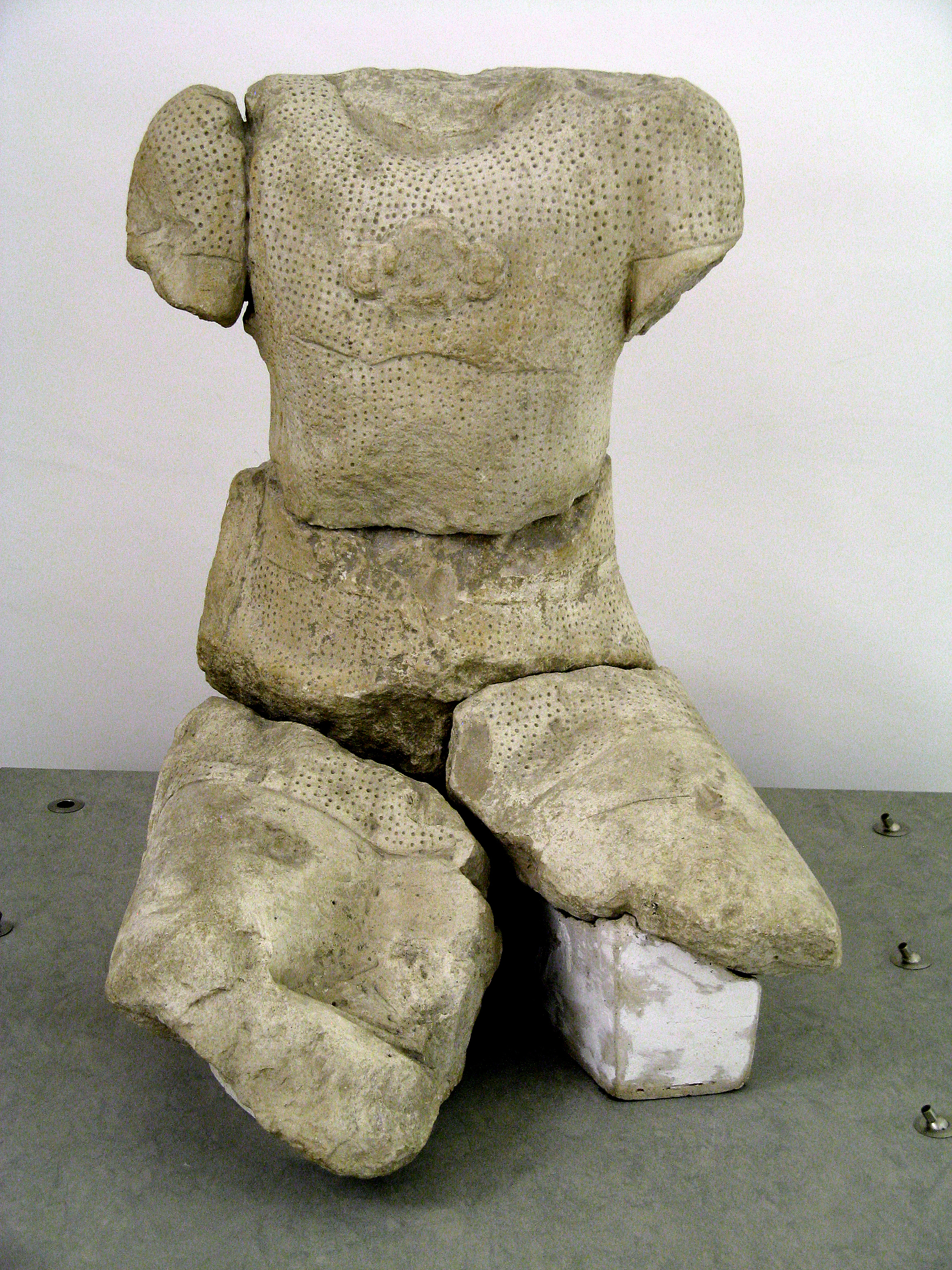
Seated warrior

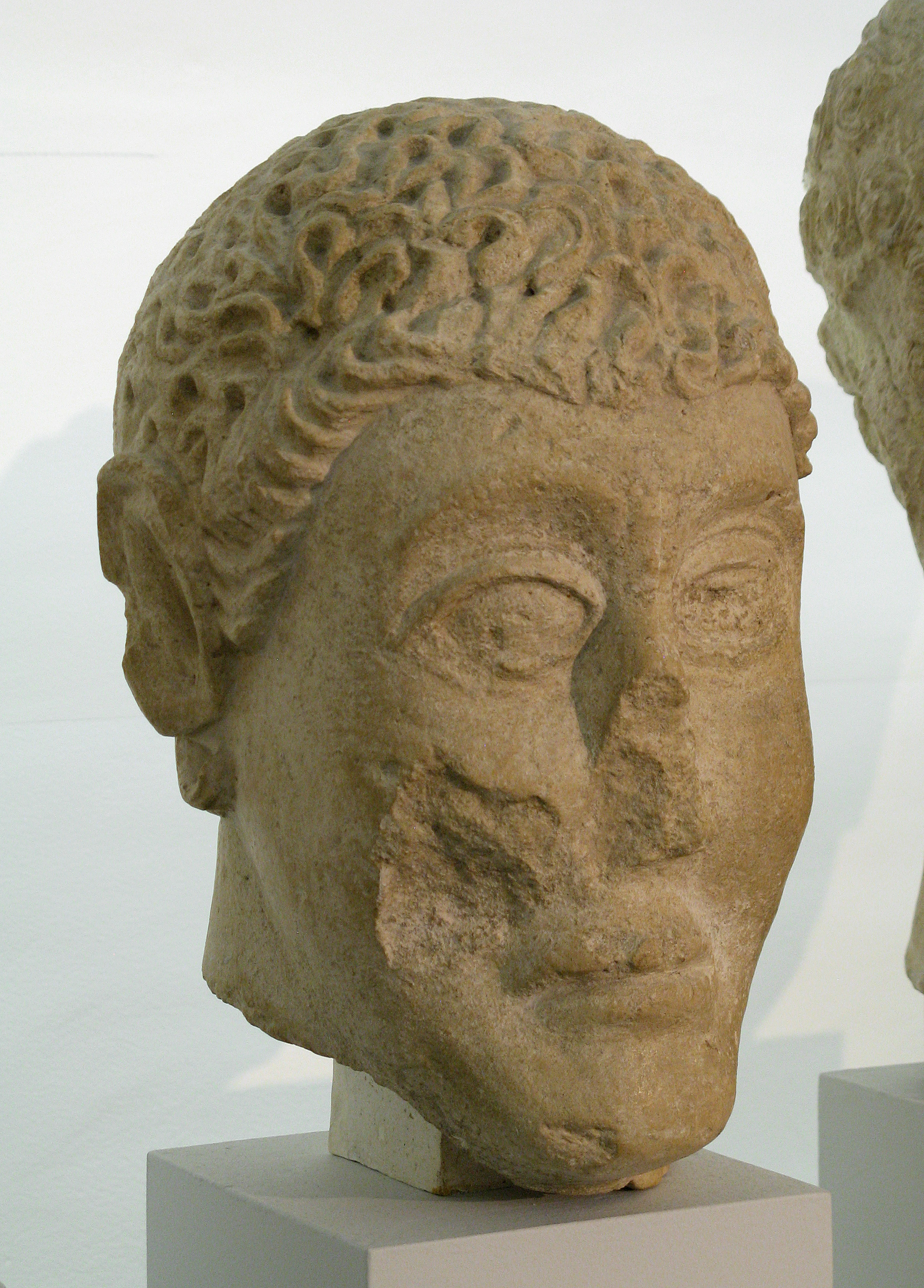
Head of a warrior

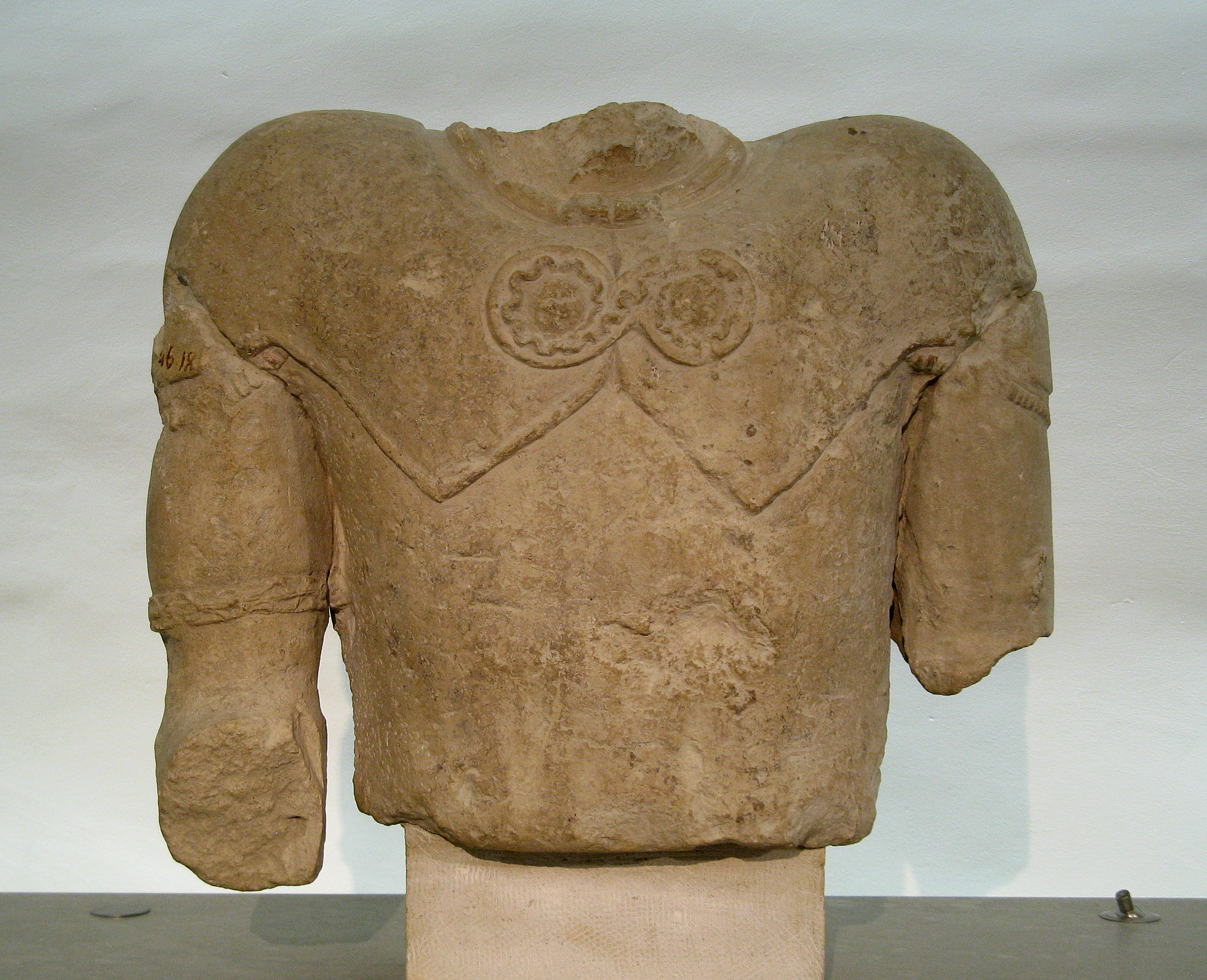
Torso of a warrior

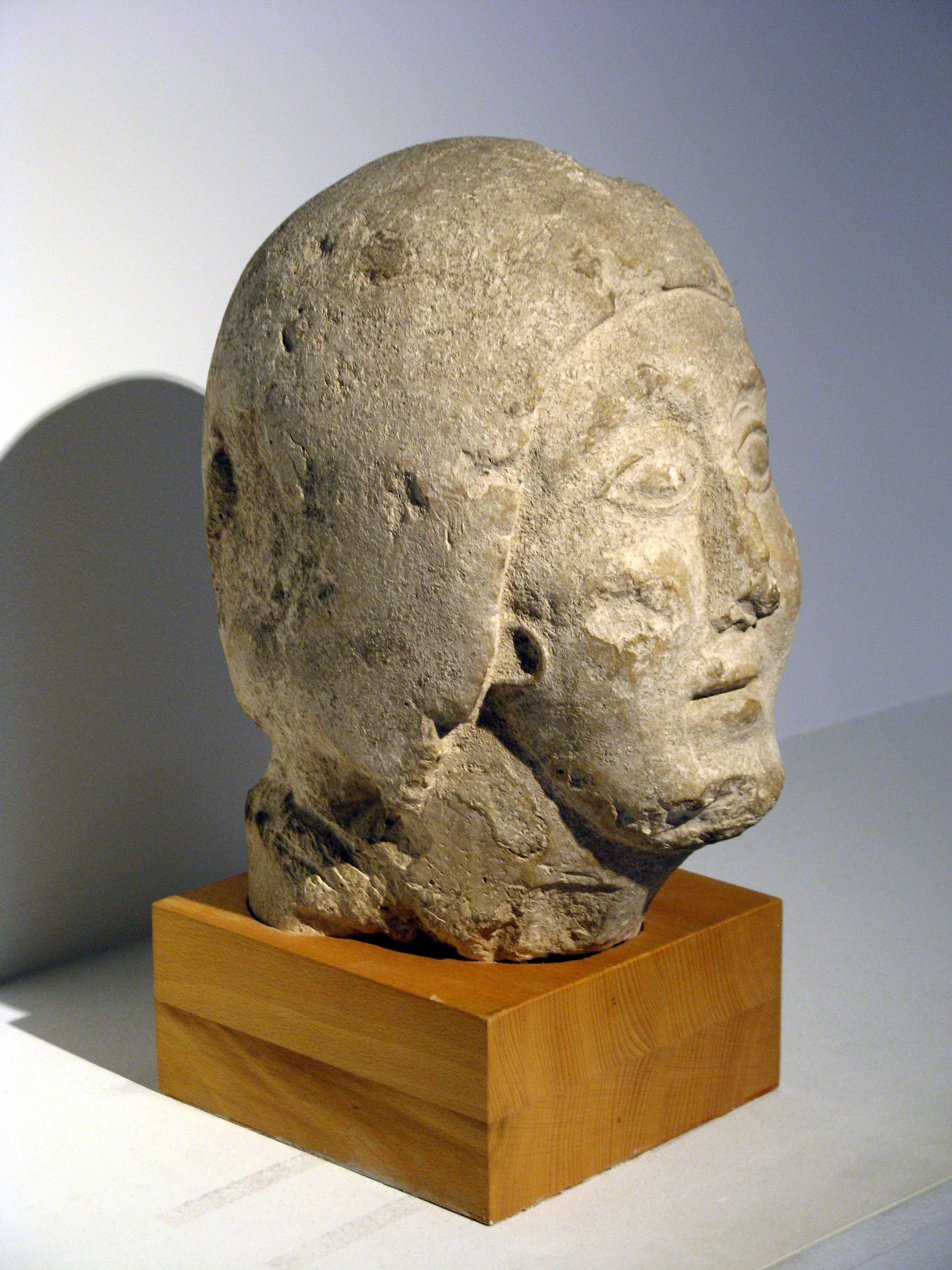
Head of a woman

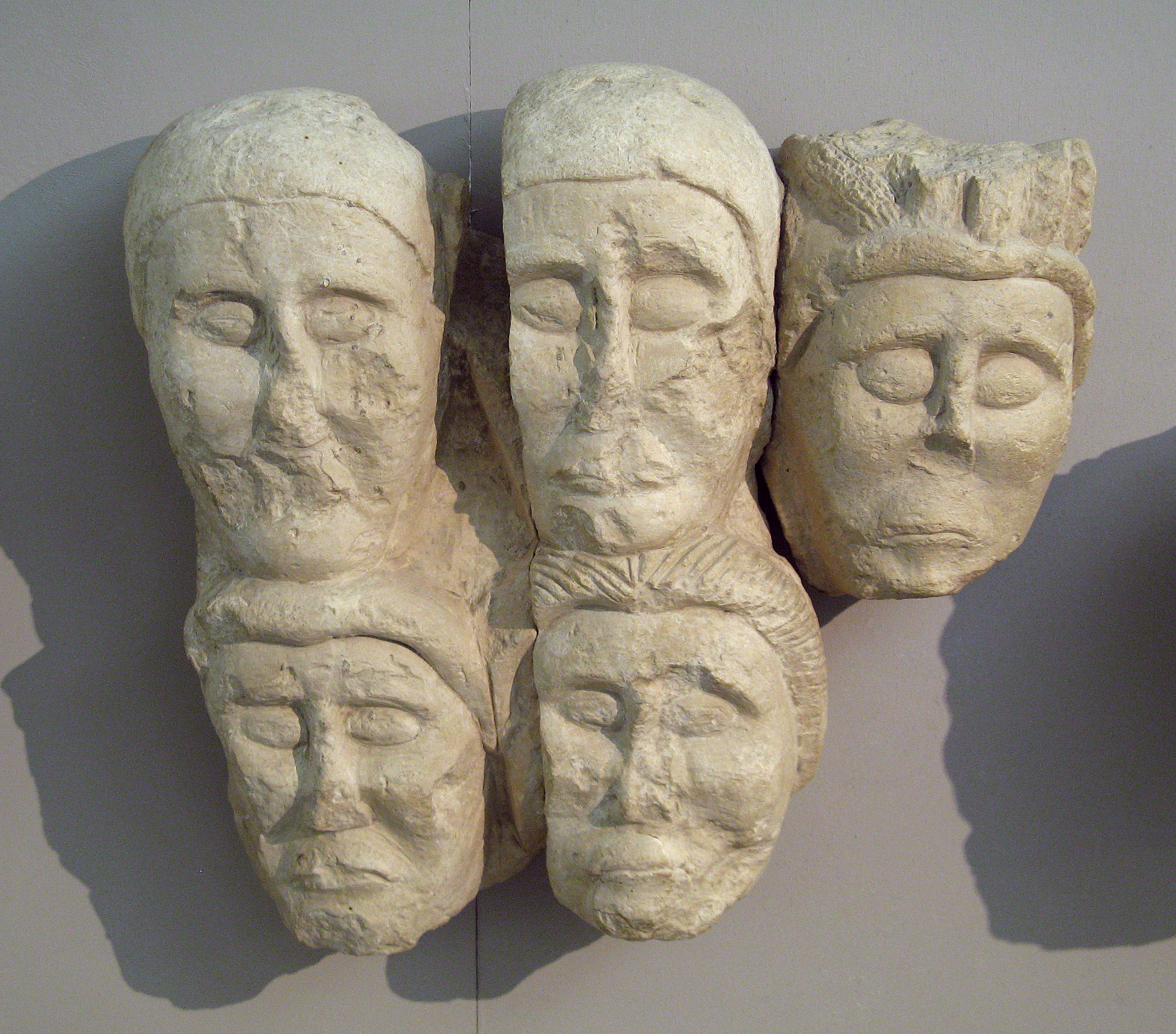
Severed heads

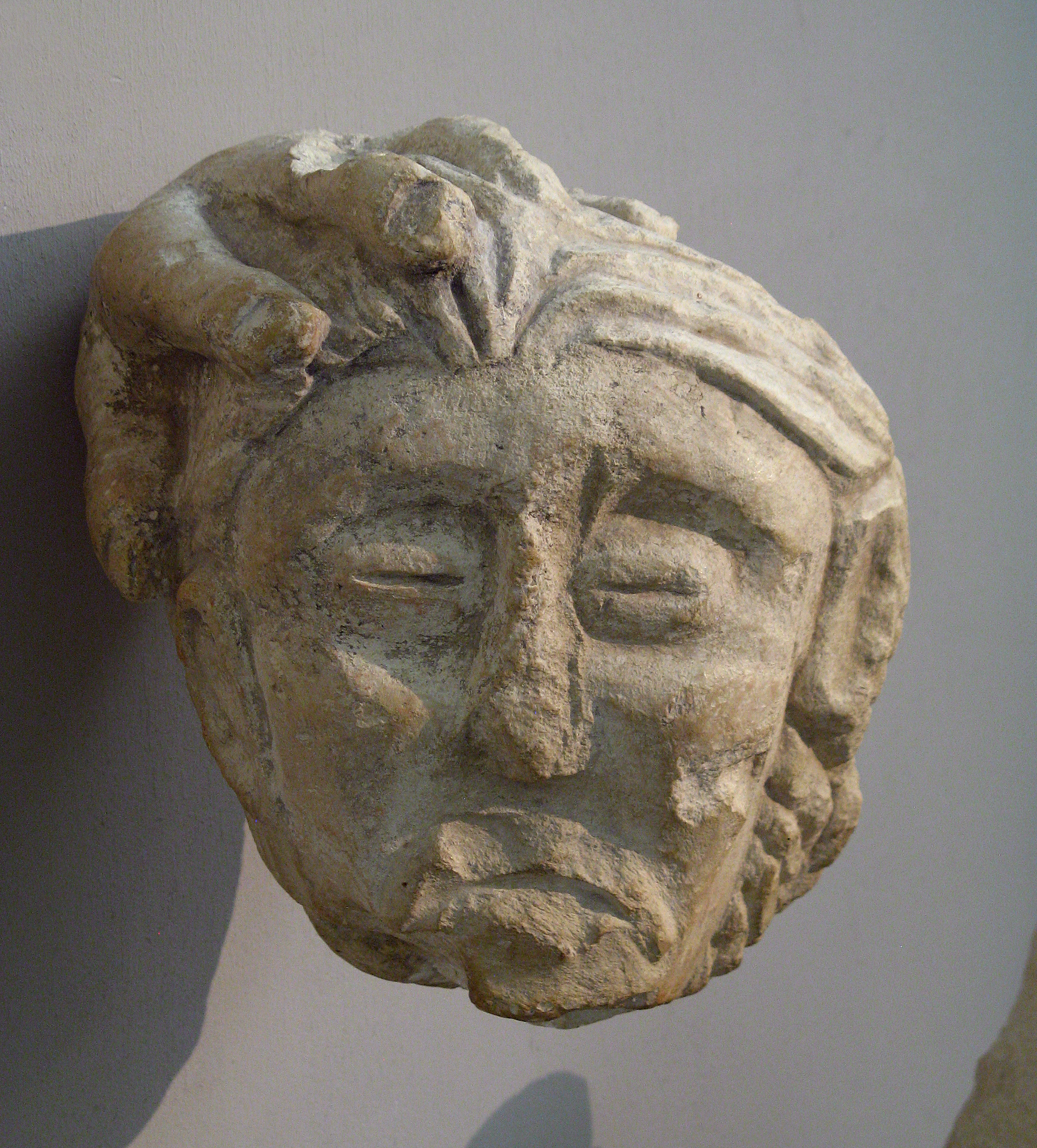
Severed head

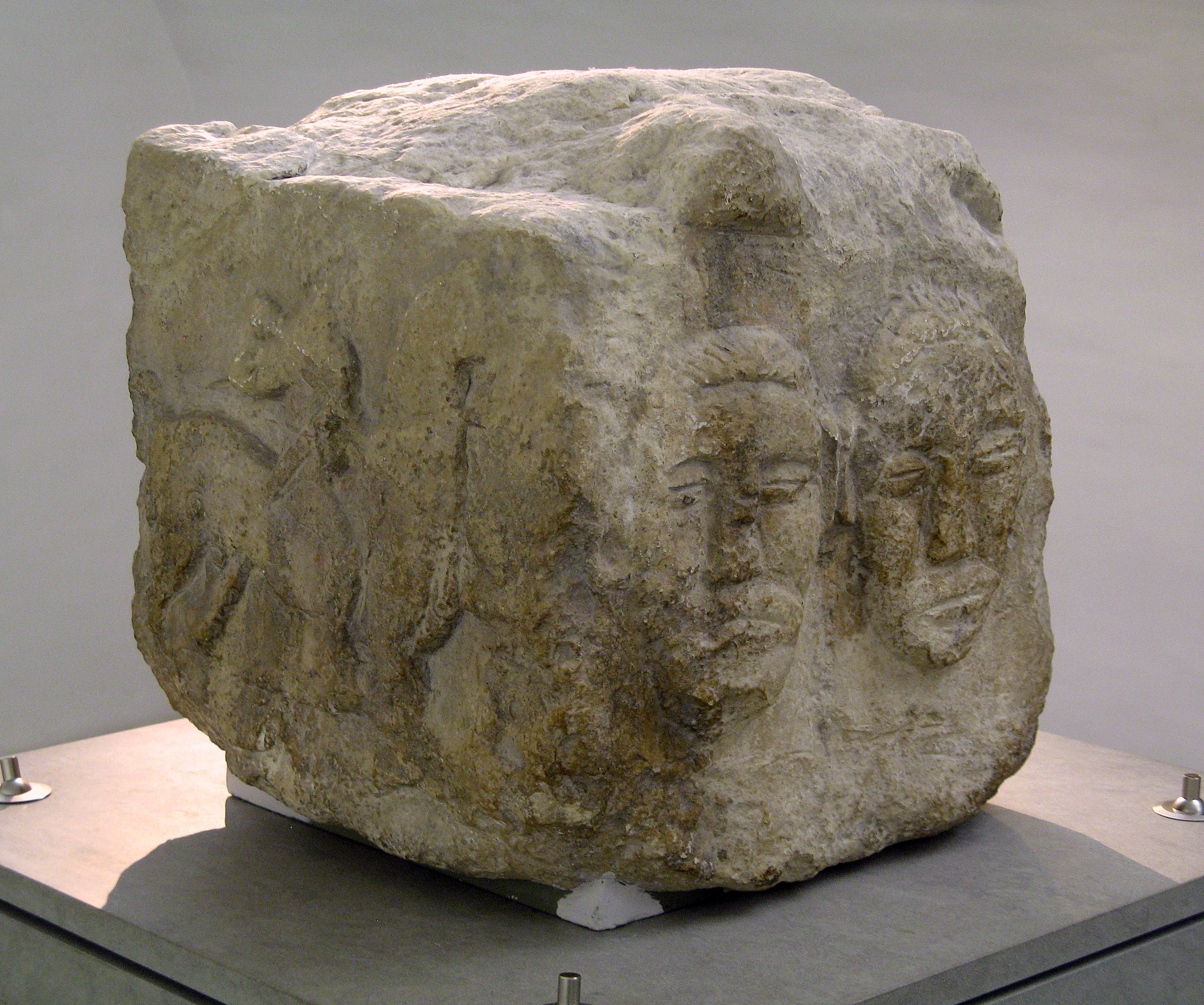
Architectural block with severed heads and horseman

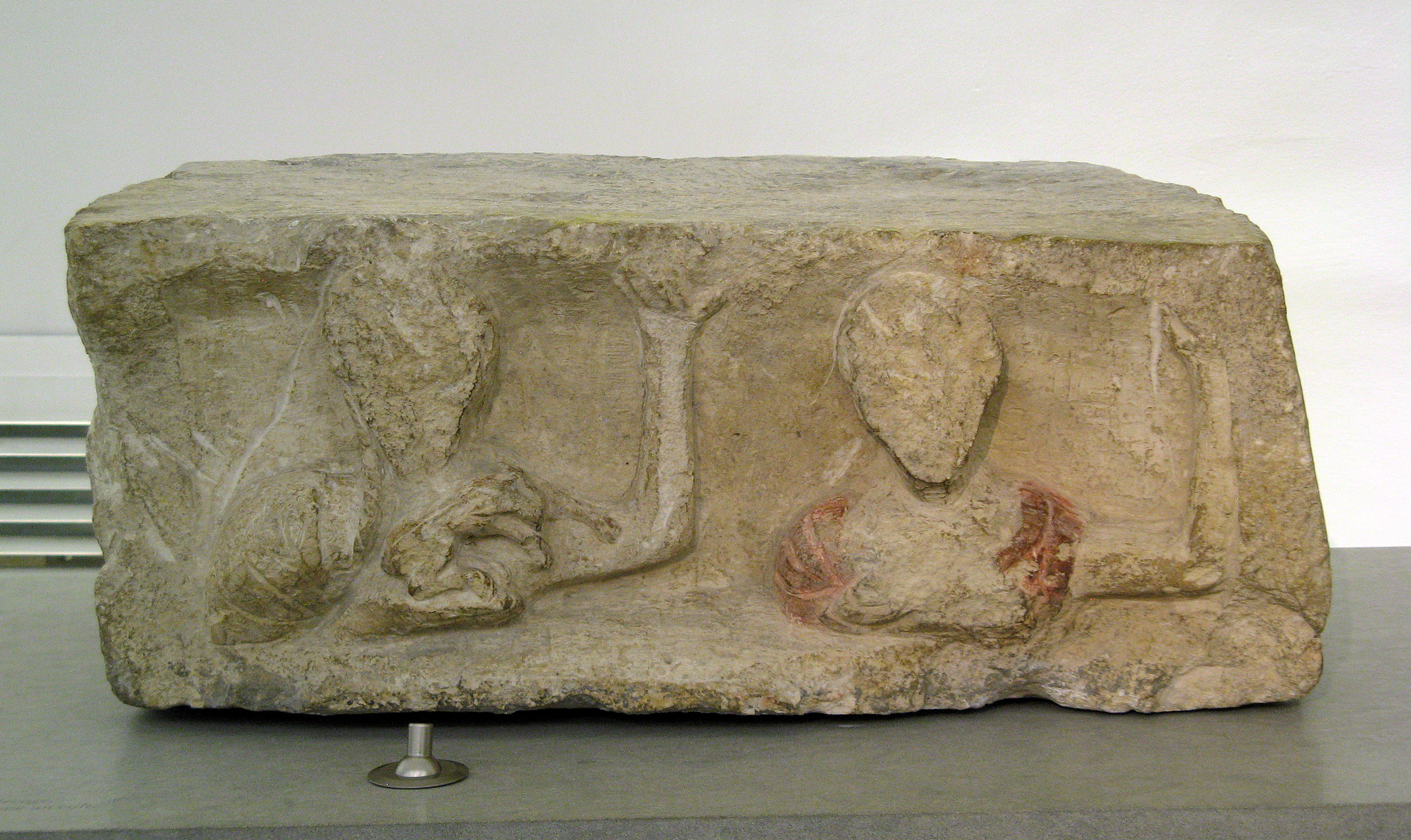
Relief of worshipers

== See also ==
- La Tène culture
- Oppidum
