= Verucini =

Gallic tribe

The Verucini were a Gallic tribe dwelling in the inlands of southeastern Provence during the Iron Age.

== Name ==
The Verucini are solely attested by Pliny as Verucini in the 1st century AD.

The ethnonym Verucini is a latinized form of Gaulish Uerucinoi (sg. Uerucinos). It derives from the stem ueru- ('large'), and is related to the personal names Ueru-cloetius, Ueru-clonis, Ueruccius, and Ueruco.

== Geography ==
Pliny describes the territory of the Verucini as situated near the Suelteri (Saint-Tropez). They appear to have lived between the Argens and Verdon rivers, near modern Draguignan, Salernes, and Aups. A deus Mars Veracinius is attested in the Adon pass (Les Mujouls). It was probably the protector deity of the Verucini, and perhaps also that of the travellers to this mountainous region.

== Bibliography ==
- Barruol, Guy (1969). Les Peuples préromains du Sud-Est de la Gaule: étude de géographie historique. E. de Boccard. OCLC 3279201.
- Delamarre, Xavier (2003). Dictionnaire de la langue gauloise: Une approche linguistique du vieux-celtique continental. Errance. ISBN 9782877723695.
- Falileyev, Alexander (2010). Dictionary of Continental Celtic Place-names: A Celtic Companion to the Barrington Atlas of the Greek and Roman World. CMCS. ISBN 978-0955718236.
