= Salyes =

Celto-Ligurian people

The Salyes or Salluvii (Greek: Σάλυες) were an ancient Celto-Ligurian people dwelling between the Durance river and the Greek colony of Massalia during the Iron Age. Although earlier writers called them 'Ligurian', Strabo used the denomination 'Celto-ligurian' in the early 1st century AD. A Celtic influence is noticeable in their religion, which centred on the cult of the tête coupée ('severed head'), as well as in the names of their towns and leaders. During the 2nd century BC, the Salyes were most likely at the head of a political and military confederation that united both Gallic and Ligurian tribes.

During most of their early history, the Salyes were in conflict with the neighbouring Greek inhabitants of Massalia, and later on with their ally the Roman Republic, until the consul Gaius Sextius Calvinus sacked their hill-fort Entremont ca. 122 BC. Revolts against the Roman conquerors were crushed in 90 and 83 BC.

== Name ==
They are mentioned as Sallyas (acc.) by Caesar (mid-1st c. BC), emended to Sallyes; Salluvii and Saluum (var. Saluium, Salluuiorum) by Livy (late 1st c. BC); Sálluas (Σάλλυας; var. Sállues Σάλλυες and Salúōn Σαλύων) by Strabo (early 1st c. AD); Sallui and Salluuiorum by Pliny (1st c. AD); Sálues (Σάλυες; var. Σάλικες) by Ptolemy (2nd c. AD); and as Salyes by Avienius (4th c. AD).

The older form was probably Salyes (Greek Salues; pronounced /Salwes/), latinised as Salluvii (/Salluwii/). It is the form used by Caesar under the variant Sallyas in the oldest surviving attestation of the name, while Pliny wrote Salluvii some decades later in the late 1st century BC. The Latin Salluvii has been explained as a latinisation of an earlier Salues (Greek Σάλυες) borrowed before the palatalisation of upsilon, that is before the 4th century BC.

The name was probably drawn from the people's own language, but its linguistic affiliation is disputed. Patrizia de Bernardo Stempel reads it as Celtic, from an earlier *Sl̥wes ('the own ones'), which she compares with the name of the Suebi. Pierre-Yves Lambert holds the people to be Ligurian rather than Celtic, with a native form *Salwoi. The name has also been compared with the Celtiberian Salluienses and the Turma Salluitana, and with the Italic personal names Salluvius, Sallubius, Salluius and Sallyius. Michel Bats has also proposed to connect Salyes to the name of Massalia.

They bear the same name as the Salluvii (also Sallui) from Cisalpina, mentioned by Livy and Cato, and with whom they have been identified.

== Geography ==
=== Territory ===
The Salyes in southeastern Gaul.

The Salyes dwelled in the hinterland of Massalia, between the Massif de l'Étoile and the Durance river. The Barrington Atlas locates their territory north of the Avatici, Tricores and Segobrigii, south of the Dexivates, west of the Tritolli, and east of the Anatilii.

As for the stretch of country which begins at Antipolis and extends as far as Massilia or a little farther, the tribe of the Sallyes inhabits the Alps that lie above the seaboard and also—promiscuously with the Greeks—certain parts of the same seaboard.

— Strabo 1923, Geōgraphiká, 4:6:3.

The Salluvian confederation, a political entity dominated by the Salyes that likely emerged in the 2nd century BC, covered a much larger area stretching from the Rhône to the Loup river (just west of the Var), and reaching the Mediterranean sea to the south, between the Arecomici, the Cavari and the later province of Alpes Maritimae.

=== Settlements ===
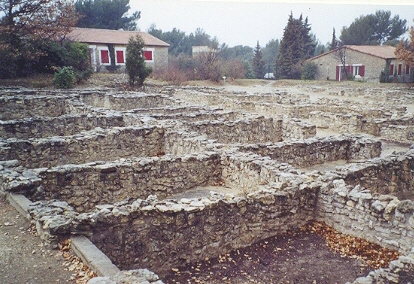
Vestiges of Entremont.

Their pre-Roman chief town was the oppidum of Entremont (3 km north of modern Aix-en-Provence). It displays Greek influence in its sculpture, its defences, and the layout of its streets. However, the religious monuments and iconography were overwhelmingly native. The settlement saw a relatively late development during the 3rd–2nd centuries BC. It was able to control the east-west routes connecting the Rhône to the Alps, as well as the north-south routes between Massalia and the Durance. Entremont was seized ca. 122 BC by the Roman consul Gaius Sextius Calvinus, who founded a garrison near some warm spring in its vicinity. Refounded by Caesar as a colonia latina, it was made a full colony known as Colonia Iulia Augusta Aquis Sextiis under Augustus (27 BC–14 AD).

Another settlement was known as Glanon (Latin Glanum, near modern St-Rémy-de-Provence). The name, meaning 'the clear/transparent one' in Gaulish, probably took its origin from a nearby river. Located on the great trade route connecting the Iberian Peninsula to Italy and occupied from the 6th–5th centuries BC onward, Glanon came under Greek influence from the mid-2nd century BC, which has been interpreted either as a takeover by the Massaliotes, or else as a Greek cultural imprint on the local Salluvian aristocracy. Glanon may have become the chief town of the Salyes after the sack of Entremont by the Romans ca. 122 BC. Major construction programs were launched between ca. 120 and 90 BC, including sanctuaries, public squares and administrative buildings, presumably for Glanon to assert itself as the dominant settlement of the area and display its new status to its neighbours. Glanon was abandoned ca. 270 AD after suffering from raids by Germanic tribes, and a new walled town was built in its vicinity at the site of St-Rémy.

The oppidum of Baou-Roux was located between Entremont and Massalia.

== History ==
=== Early history ===
The Salyes settled in the hinterland of Massalia at the latest in the 6th century BC. According to a legend recounted by Livy, they fought against the Phocaean settlers at the time of the foundation of Massalia ca. 600, but were defeated by the roving armies of Bellovesus. During the 5th century BC, the Salyes remained a small tribal group, although they controlled an important trade route that went through the valley of the Arc. By the time of the Second Punic War (218–201 BC), they also controlled areas as far south as the coastal mountains near Massalia.

These were the first of the Transalpine Celti that the Romans conquered, though they did so only after carrying on war with both them and the Ligures for a long time—because the latter had barred all the passes leading to Iberia that ran through the seaboard. And, in fact, they kept making raids both by land and sea, and were so powerful that the road was scarcely practicable even for great armies. And it was not until the eightieth year of the war that the Romans succeeded, though only with difficulty, in opening up the road for a breadth of only twelve stadia to those travelling on public business.

— Strabo 1923, Geōgraphiká, 4:6:3.

Conflicts between Rome and the Salyes lasted during nearly eighty years from the end of the Second Punic War (201 BC), during which the eastern part of Iberia came under Roman control and Massalia remained a faithful ally of Rome, up until the rendition of the Salluvian chief town Entremont ca. 122 BC. Involved in piracy and raids, the Ligurians threatened throughout the 2nd century BC the Massaliotes colonies along the Mediterranean coast, and more generally the trade route between the Iberian Peninsula and Italy. This culminated in a Roman military intervention in 154 BC against the Deciates and Oxybii, two Ligurian tribes that were presumably part of the Salluvian confederation.

=== Roman conquest ===
In 125 BC, the Salyes waged war on Massalia, leading the Roman Senate to send the consul Marcus Fulvius Flaccus to Massalia's assistance. The establishment of a Greek colony at Glanum, on Salluvian territory, may have been the casus belli. Flaccus defeated the Salyes, along with the Vocontii and some other Ligurian tribes presumably part of the Salluvian confederation on the eastern borders of the Massaliote territory, then celebrated his triumph in Rome in 123 BC. Shortly after, another consul, Gaius Sextius Calvinus, sacked their chief town, Entremont, and established near its ruin a Roman garrison post, thereafter to be known as Aquae Sextiae (modern Aix-en-Provence). Sextius also forced the Salyes to cede the areas they controlled near the Mediterranean coast; part of their territory was granted to the Massaliotes.

During the conflict, the leaders of the Salyes, including their king Toutomotulos (or Teutomalius), fled with the rest of their armies to their allies the Allobroges, who refused to hand them over to Rome. A further and larger Roman force, including war elephants, was sent under the command of Gnaeus Domitius Ahenobarbus, who defeated the Allobroges at the Battle of Vindalium in 121 BC. In August of the same year, the Roman army, strengthened by the troops of Quintus Fabius Maximus, inflicted a decisive defeat on a massive combined force of Allobroges, Arveni and the remaining Salyes at the Battle of the Isère River. Toutomotulus' followers were killed, enslaved, or driven into exile, while Crato, the Salluvian leader of the pro-Graeco-Roman faction, secured the release of 900 of his fellow citizens from slavery.

Some time between 120 and 117, the territory of the Salyes was incorporated into the Roman province of Gallia Transalpina.

=== Early Roman period ===
During the Cimbrian War (113–101 BC), the Battle of Aquae Sextiae was fought in their territory in 102 BC. A revolt of the Salyes was suppressed by the consul Gaius Coelius Caldus in 90 BC, and another uprising was crushed in 83 BC.

After the foundation of a colonia romana at Arelate (modern Arles) in 46 BC, a large area west of Aquae Sextiae, including much of the Salluvian lands that had been handed over to Massalia around 122 BC, became subject to Arelate.

== Culture ==
=== Ethnic identity ===
Writing in the early 1st century AD, Greek geographer Strabo implies that the 'Ligurian' (Λίγυας) Salyes mentioned by earlier writers occupied the hinterland of Massalia, whereas the later 'Celto-Ligurian' (Κελτολίγυας) Salyes also controlled the area between the Rhône and the Luberon.

... though the early writers of the Greeks call the Sallyes 'Ligues', and the country which the Massiliotes hold, 'Ligustica', later writers name them 'Celtoligues', and attach to their territory all the level country as far as Luerio and the Rhodanus, the country from which the inhabitants, divided into ten parts, used to send forth an army, not only of infantry, but of cavalry as well.

— Strabo 1923, Geōgraphiká, 4:6:3.

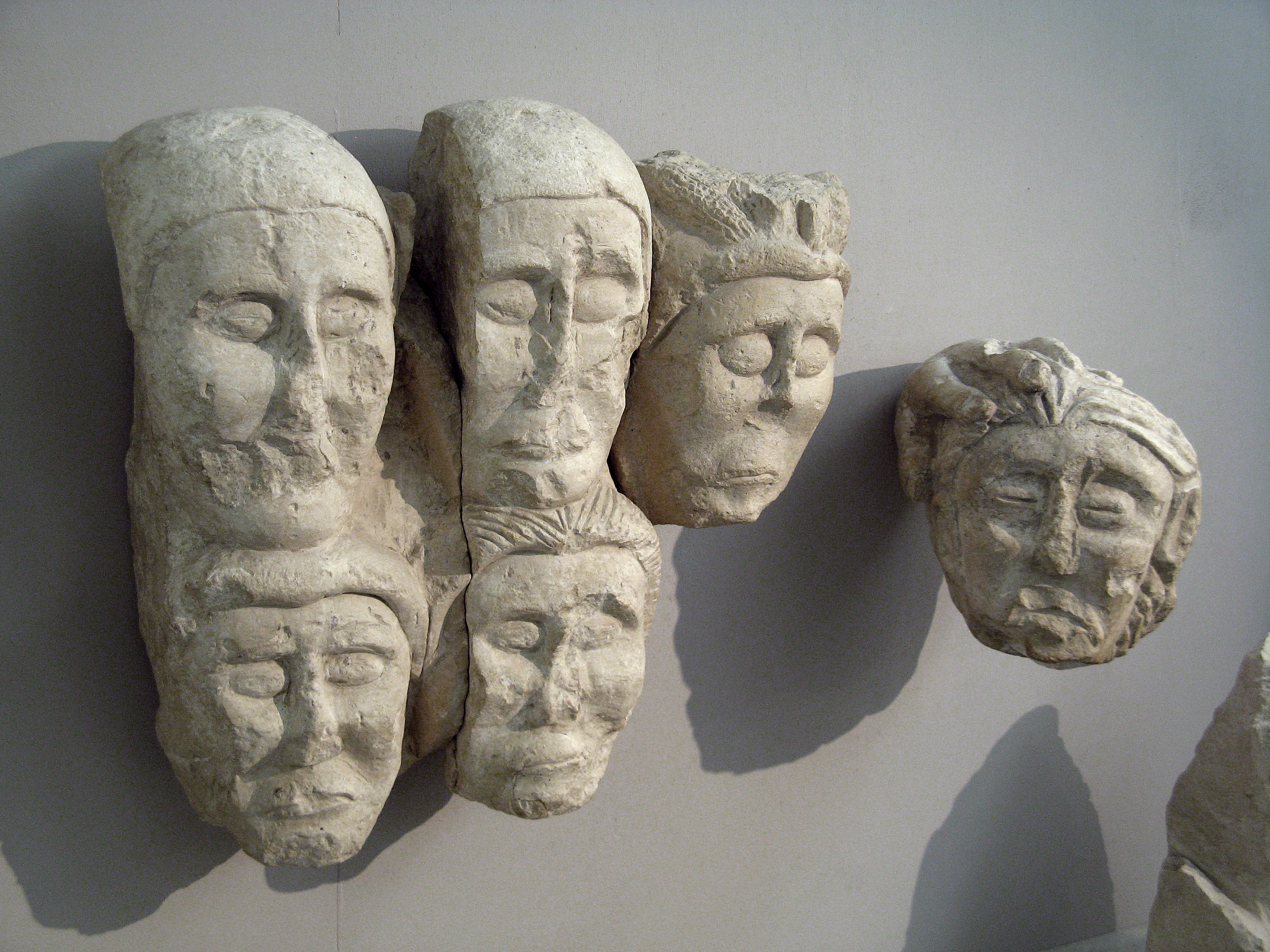
Sculptures of severed heads from Entremont.

In fact, the area surrounding the Salluvian chief-town of Entremont (near modern Aix-en-Provence) represented the frontier between the Ligurian tribes dwelling along the Mediterranean coast and the Celtic tribes of the lower Rhône Valley, who displayed a common force against the Roman conqueror at the end of the 2nd century BC. This geo-cultural frontier was probably used by the Romans when tracing the administrative border between the civitates of Arelate and Aquae Sextiae in the 1st century BC.

The Celtic names of Salluvian rulers (Toutomotulos) and towns (Glanon) may suggest that Celtic speakers formed the ruling class of the confederation. As seen during the Roman conquest of the region, the local aristrocracy developed links with neighbouring Gallic tribes such as the Allobroges, although literary sources point towards a more complex reality, with significant Greek and Ligurian influences.

=== Religion ===
The religion of the Salyes centred on the cult of the tête coupée ('severed head'), with important shrines located as Roquepertuse and Entremont. The cult persisted at Entremont until the sack of the settlement by the Romans ca. 122 BC.

A Celtic-Ligurian sanctuary dedicated to the god Glan and the Matres was found at Glanon near a mineral spring.

== Political organisation ==
As originally proposed by historian Guy Barruol in 1969, the Salyes were probably at the head of what he has called the "Salluvian confederation", a political entity dominated by the Salyes that likely emerged in the 2nd century BC. It may have included at its height the Anatilii, Libicii, Nearchi, Avatici, Dexivates, Segobrigii, Comani, Tricores, Tritolli, Camactulici, Suelteri, Oxybii, Ligauni, Deciates, and the Reii.

The ties uniting those various tribes were probably loose, and local oppida must have retained considerable autonomy, as evidenced by the short lapse of time during which the confederacy collapsed when the Romans destroyed the Salluvian chief town and subjugated their leaders in 122–121 BC.
