= Avatici =

Gallic tribe

The Avatici (Gaulish: *Auaticoi) were a Gallic tribe dwelling near the Étang de Berre, between the mouth of the Rhône river and Massilia (modern Marseille), during the Roman period.

== Name ==
They are mentioned as Au̓atilō͂n (Αὐατιλῶν; var. Αὐατικῶν) by Ptolemy (2nd c. AD), and an oppidum Maritima Avaticorum is documented by Pliny (1st c. AD) and Pomponius Mela (mid-1st c. AD).

== Geography ==
=== Territory ===
The Barrington Atlas locates their territory near the Étang de Berre, southwest of the Saluvii, and possibly northwest of the Tricores. Their territory stretched from the eastern part of the mouth of the Rhône river to the west of Massilia, and from the Mediterranean Sea to the Crau in the north. According to historian Guy Barruol, they were part of the Saluvian confederation.

Beyond [the mouth of the Rhône] are the canals leading out of the Rhone, famous as the work of Gaius Marius whose distinguished name they bear, Lake Mastromela and the town of Maritima of the Avatici, and above are the Stony Plains, where tradition says that Hercules fought battles, the district of the Anatilii, and inland those of the Dexivates and Cavares. Returning to the sea we have the districts of the Tricores...

— Pliny 1938, Naturalis Historia, 3:34.

=== Settlements ===
Their chief town, located in the province of Gallia Narbonensis, was known as Maritima Avaticorum. The location of the settlement is not precisely indicated by the sources, but most scholars place it in modern Martigues, possibly at the site of Tholon, on the coast of the Étang de Berre. Ptolemy, and later the Ravenna Cosmography, calls it a Colonia, but this is likely an error since both Mela and Pliny (who used sources from the Augustan period) refer to the settlement as an oppidum in the 1st century AD. The lands situated around the Étang de Berre were probably given to Arelate (Arles) by the Romans when their subjugated Massalia in 49 BC.

Another oppidum was located at Mastromela or Mastramélē (Μαστραμέλη). It has been traditionally identified with the Oppidum of Saint-Blaise, although this has been criticized since the settlement is too far from the Étang de Berre (Stagnum Mastromela), after which it is named. Alternatively, archaeologist Jean Chausserie-Laprée has proposed the Île de Martigues, occupied from the mid-5th century BC until the end of the 2nd century BC, as the most probable location.

== See also ==
- Gaul
- List of peoples of Gaul
- List of Celtic tribes
