= Suelteri =

Gallic tribe

The Suelteri were a Gallic tribe dwelling near the Mediterranean coast, between modern Hyères and the Gulf of Saint-Tropez, during the Iron Age and the Roman era.

== Name ==
The Suelteri are attested as Suelteri by Pliny (1st century AD) and as Selteri on the Tabula Peutingeriana (4–5th c. AD).

The Gaulish name Suelteri may derive from the Celtic stem *suel- (cf. OIr sel 'turn; period of time', MW chwel 'turn; course; commotion’).

== Geography ==
Pliny describes the territory of the Suelteri as situated near the Camactulici (Toulon) and the Verucini. The Tabula Peutingeriana locates the Selteri between the Mediterranean Sea of the Durance river. They appear to have lived in the Massif des Maures and the area that area stretching from Olbia (Hyères) to the Gulf of Saint-Tropez, corresponding to the coastline of the later Diocese of Fréjus.

According to history Guy Barruol, they were part of the Salluvian confederation.

== Bibliography ==
- Barruol, Guy (1969). Les Peuples préromains du Sud-Est de la Gaule: étude de géographie historique. E. de Boccard. OCLC 3279201.
- Falileyev, Alexander (2010). Dictionary of Continental Celtic Place-names: A Celtic Companion to the Barrington Atlas of the Greek and Roman World. CMCS. ISBN 978-0955718236.
