= Libicii =

The Gaulish name Libicii or Libui can refer to:

- Libicii (Narbonensis), an ancient Gallic tribe dwelling in Camargue
- Libicii (Cisalpine Gaul), an ancient Gallic tribe dwelling around Vercelli
