= Nearchus (disambiguation) =

- Nearchus of Lato, c. 360-300 BC, was a famous explorer, a navarch and officer in the army of Alexander the Great.

Nearchus (Greek: Νέαρχος, Nearchos) may refer to

- Nearchos (painter), 5th century BC, an Attic potter and vase painter active in Athens circa 570 to 555 BC
- Nearchus of Elea, 5th century BC, a tyrant of the Greek city of Elea in Magna Graecia
- Nearchus of Orchomenus, fl. 234 BC, a ruler of the Greek city of Orchomenus in Arcadia, probably a tyrant
- Saint Nearchus, 3rd century AD, an Armenian Christian martyr and saint
