= Javier de Hoz =

Spanish philologist (1940–2019)

- Born: Jesús Javier de Hoz Bravo; 29 July 1940
- Died: 12 January 2019 (aged 78)

Academic background
- Education: Universidad Complutense

Jesús Javier de Hoz Bravo (29 July 1940 – 12 January 2019) was a Spanish philologist and Catedrático (University Professor).

His main areas of research were Paleohispanic languages, historical linguistics, ancient Celtic languages, history of writing, preclassical Greek literature, Greek epigraphy, and ancient Greek theatre.

== Biography ==
Born in Madrid on 29 July 1940, Javier de Hoz earned a PhD in Philology from the Universidad Complutense de Madrid in 1966. He was Professor at the Universidad de Sevilla (1967–1969), the Universidad de Salamanca (1969–1989), Dean of the Faculty of Philology of the Universidad de Salamanca (1981–1985), Director of the Colegio Trilingüe of Salamanca (1970–1984) and, from 1989 to 2010, Professor in the Universidad Complutense (Department of Greek Philology and Indo-European Studies).

De Hoz served as expert advisor for the UNESCO Central Co-ordinating Committee for the Study of Celtic Cultures (1984–1999), and was a member of the Council of Patronage of the Fundación Pastor de Estudios Clásicos. He also served as the Director of the Project Hesperia for the development of a database for Palaeohispanic data.

Javier de Hoz died on 12 January 2019 at the age of 78.

== Works ==
- New approaches to Celtic place-names in Ptolemy's Geography. Ediciones Clásicas. 2005. ISBN 978-84-7882-572-1. (co-edited with Eugenio R. Luján and Patrick Sims-Williams)
- Historia lingüística de la Península Ibérica en la antigüedad. Consejo Superior de Investigaciones Científicas. 2010. ISBN 978-84-00-09259-7.
- Historia lingüística de la Península Ibérica en la antigüedad. II : el mundo ibérico prerromano y la indoeuropeización. Consejo Superior de Investigaciones Científicas. 2011. ISBN 978-84-00-09406-5.
