= Massalia =

Ancient Greek colony

Massalia Μασσαλία (Ancient Greek)
- c. 600 BC–49 BC
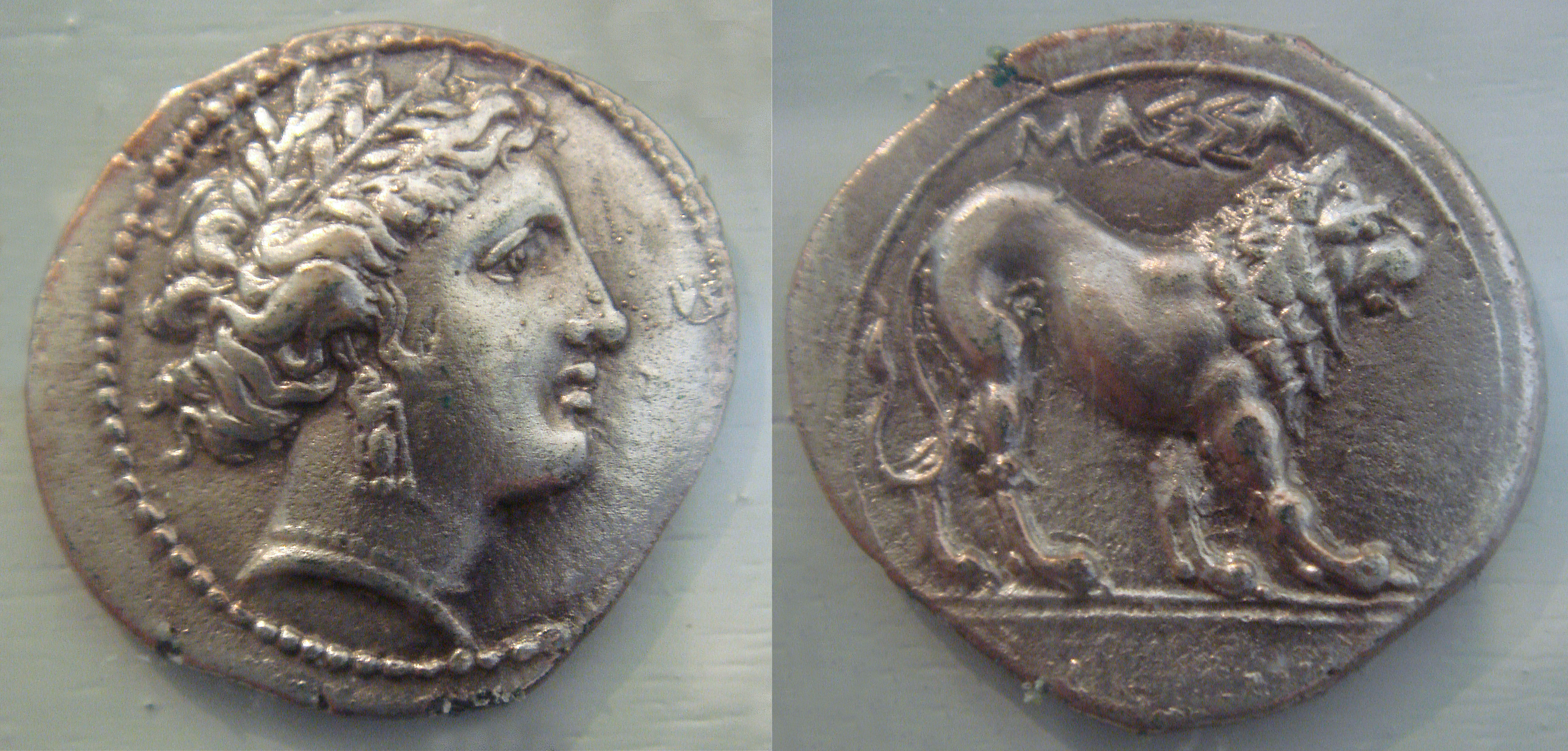
- A silver drachma, dated 375–200 BC, bearing the head of the Greek goddess Artemis on the obverse and a lion on the reverse

- Greek settlement in the Mediterranean; Massalia shown in southern Gaul.
- Capital: Massalia
- Common languages: Ionic Greek
- Religion: Greek Polytheism
- Government: Oligarchic republic
- History
  - Founded by Greeks from Phocaea: c. 600 BC
  - Alliance with the Roman Republic: 2nd century BC
  - Conquered by Julius Caesar: 49 BC
- Currency: Drachma
Succeeded by
Roman Republic

Massalia (Greek: Μασσαλία, romanized: Massalía; Latin: Massilia) was an ancient Greek colony (apoikia) on the Mediterranean coast, east of the Rhône. Settled by Ionians from Phocaea c. 600 BC, this apoikia grew up rapidly, and became the center of ancient Greek trade in western Mediterranean, branching out and creating many outposts on the coasts of what is now Spain, the south of France (including Corsica island), and northwestern Italy (modern Liguria). Massalia persisted as an independent colony until the Roman campaign in Gaul in the 1st century BC. The ruins of Massalia still exist in the contemporary city of Marseille, which is considered the oldest city of France and one of Europe's oldest continuously inhabited settlements.

== Name ==
The etymology of Massalia remains uncertain. Stephanus of Byzantium, following Timaeus, derived the name from a Greek expression meaning "fisherman’s mooring rope", an explanation regarded as fanciful by modern linguists. A possible connection has instead been proposed with the ancient ethnonym of the Salyes.

== History ==
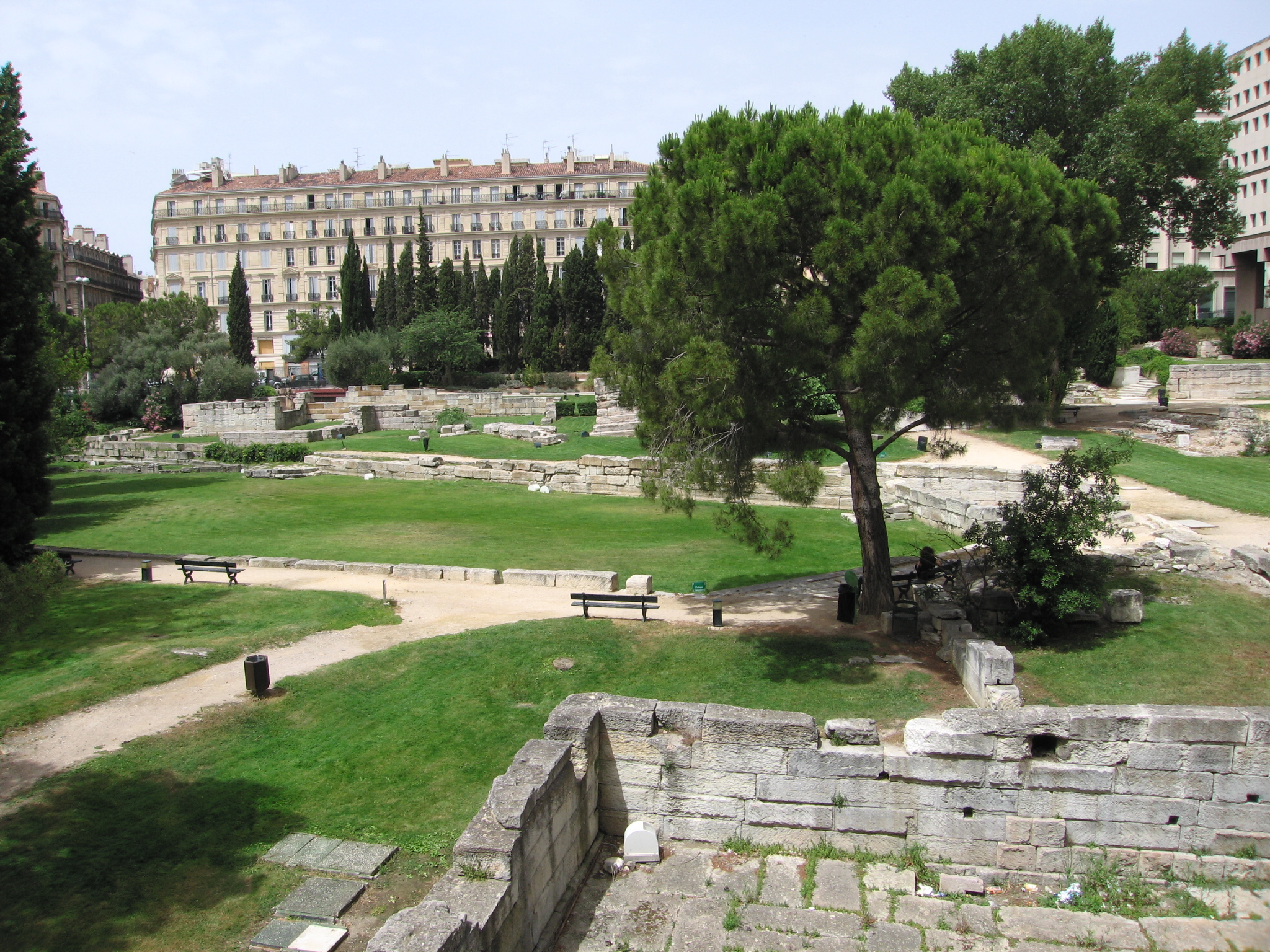
Vestiges of the ancient port of Massalia.

Massalia was established c. 600 BC by Ionian Greek settlers from Phocaea, in Ionia, in coastal Western Anatolia. After the capture of Phocaea by the Persians in 545 BC, a new wave of settlers fled towards the colony. A creation myth telling the meeting between the Greeks and the local population is given by Aristotle and Pompeius Trogus (see founding myth of Marseille).

After the middle of the 6th century BC, Massalia became an important trading post of the western Mediterranean area. It grew into creating colonies of its own on the sea coast of Gallia Narbonensis during the 4th and 3rd centuries BC, including Agathe (late 5th–early 4th c. BC), Olbia (c. 325), Tauroentium (early 3rd c.), Antipolis and Nikaia (c. mid-3rd c.). Massalia was known in ancient times for its explorers: Euthymenes travelled to the west African coast in the late 6th century BC, and Pytheas explored northwestern Europe in the late 4th century BC.

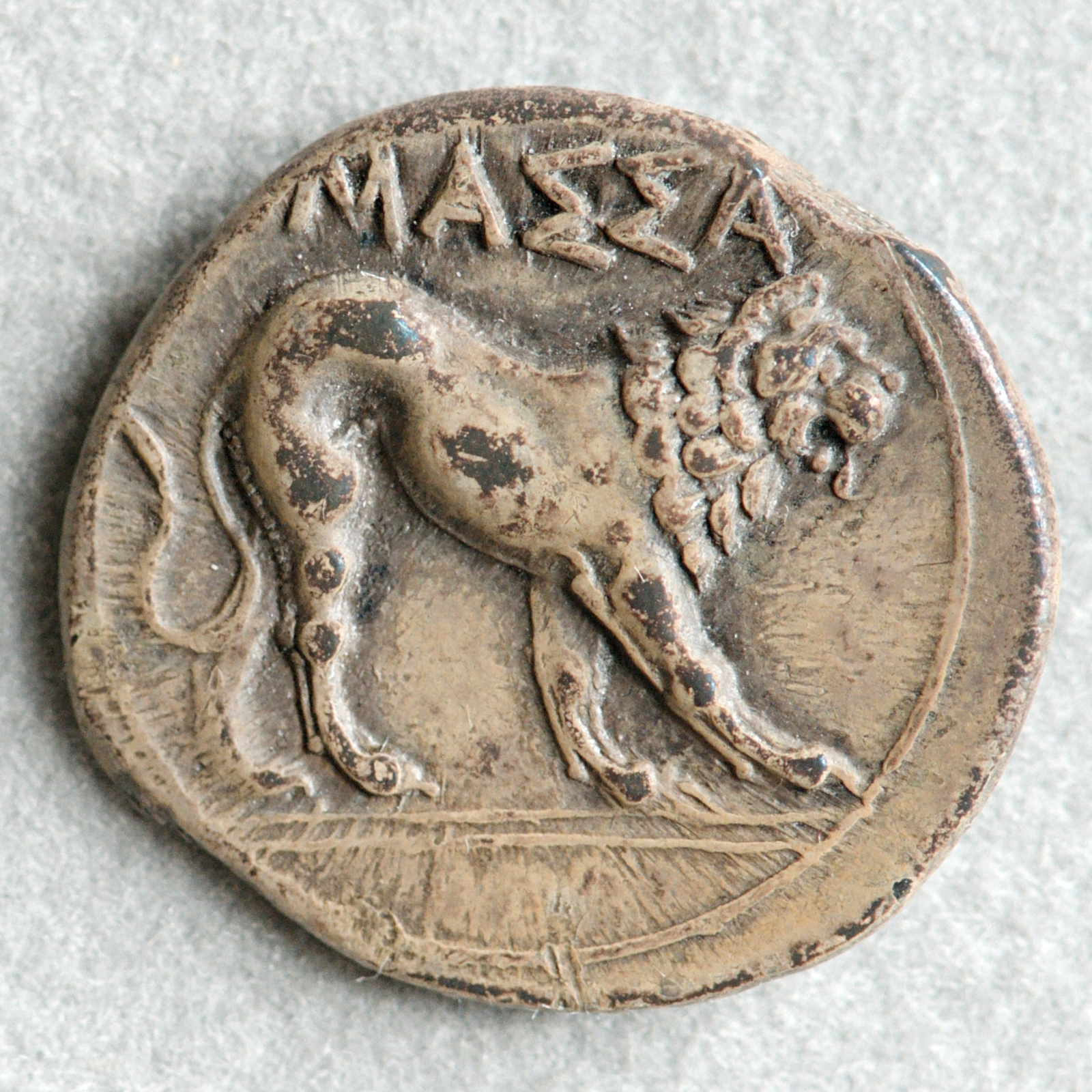
Silver drachm from Massalia (c. 390–220 BC), lion walking right

The colony remained a faithful ally of Rome during all of the Punic Wars (264–146 BC), while still maintaining a strong independent navy and a stable oligarchic government. The retreat of Carthage from the Iberian coast after its defeat in the Second Punic War (218–201) gave Massalia the dominancy over the Gulf of Lion, and the fall of Carthage in 146 BC probably led to the intensification of trade between the Greek colony and the Celtiberians. Archaeological evidence, in the form of amphora fragments, indicates that the Greeks were producing wine in the region (Provence) soon after they settled. By the time the Romans reached the area in 125 BC, the wine produced there had a reputation across the Mediterranean for high quality.

Massalia initially chose neutrality during the Civil War between Caesar and the Senate, but sided with Caesar's opponents after the arrival of Lucius Domitius Ahenobarbus. The city was besieged in 49 BC and eventually had to surrender to Caesar's army. Massalia lost most of its inland territory in the aftermath of this defeat.

During the Roman and Late Antique periods, the city, then known as Massilia in Latin, remained a major center of maritime trade. It became a civitas within the Roman Empire at the latest c. 300 AD.

== Political system ==
Massalia was ruled as an oligarchic republic by a closed aristocracy initially descending from the original settlers. An assembly of 600 timouchoi, whose membership was conditioned to the involvement in trading activities, elected 15 magistrates, 3 of them with executive power.

== Reputation ==
The Greeks used the proverbs Ἐκ Μασσαλίας ἥκεις ("you are coming out of Massalia") and Ἐς Μασσαλίαν πλεύσειας ("you might sail to Massalia") in reference to those living an effeminate and soft life, apparently because the men of Massalia were wearing fancy long perfumed robes and tying their hair up, which other Greeks interpreted as signs of disgrace.

The Romans on the other hand had a more positive view of the city as a bastion of Greek civilisation in barbarian lands, and as a loyal ally of Rome.

== Legacy ==
A genetic study conducted in 2011 found that 4% of the inhabitants of Provence belong to the haplogroup E-V13 lineage, which is especially frequent among Phocaeans (19%), and that 17% of the Y-chromosomes in Provence may be attributed to Greek colonization. According to the authors, these results suggest "a Greek male elite-dominant input into the Iron Age Provence population".

== See also ==
- Greeks in pre-Roman Gaul
- Tamaris (archaeological site)
