= Guy Barruol =

French historian and archaeologist

- Born: 10 June 1934 (age 92); Mazan, Vaucluse
- Citizenship: French
- Occupations: Historian, archaeologist

Academic work
- Institutions: CNRS
- Notable works: Les peuples préromains du Sud-Est de la Gaule (1969)

Guy Barruol (born 10 June 1934) is a French historian and archaeologist who specialises on the ancient history of Provence. He is director of research emeritus at the CNRS.

== Biography ==
Guy Barruol was born on 10 June 1934 in Mazan, Vaucluse, the son of Jean Barruol (1898–1982), a local historian and the author of numerous books on ancient and medieval Provence.

Barruol entered the CNRS in January 1962 as an intern, then was awarded the post of research assistant in 1963, research fellow in 1967, senior research fellow in 1967, and eventually became director of research in 1985. Since June 2000, he has been director of research emeritus at the CNRS.

Barruol was the director of the Antiquités Historiques of Languedoc-Roussillon from 1968 to 1982, and a member of the Conseil National de la Recherche Archéologique until 1999.

== Works ==
- Les Peuples préromains du Sud-Est de la Gaule: étude de géographie historique. E. de Boccard. 1969. OCLC 3279201.
- Carte archéologique de la Gaule: 04. Alpes-de-Haute-Provence. Les Editions de la MSH. 1997. ISBN 978-2-87754-054-4.
- Les Alpilles: encyclopédie d'une montagne provençale. Alpes de lumière. 2009. ISBN 978-2-906162-97-6.
