= Atacini =

Ancient people

The Atacini were an ancient people living in the river Aude valley during the Iron Age. They are attested only once in ancient sources, by the Roman geographer Pomponius Mela (1st century AD), who associates them with the foundation of Colonia Narbo Martius (modern Narbonne). Modern scholarship debates whether the Atacini were indigenous inhabitants of the Aude region integrated into the colony, or early Roman settlers later joined by veterans of the Tenth Legion.

== Name ==
The Atacini are recorded by Pomponius Mela (1st c. AD), who gives their name in the Latin genitive case (Atacinorum).

The ethnonym Atacini means 'people of the Aude'. It derives from Atax, the ancient name of the river Aude, and refers to a population living along the banks of this river.

== Geography ==
The Atacini appear for the first and only time in the historical record in a passage from Roman geographer Pomponius Mela, who wrote in the 1st century AD. Pomponius Mela associates them with the foundation of Colonia Narbo Martius (modern Narbonne), which indicates that the Atacini lived in this region.

Text	Translation	Reference
antestat omnis Atacinorum Decimanorumque colonia, unde olim his terris auxilium fuit, nunc et nomen et decus est Martius Narbo	Narbo Martius stands foremost as a colony of the Atacini and the Decimani, from which aid once came to these lands, and which is now both their name and their glory	Mela. II, 5, 75

== History ==
Daniela Ugolini and Christian Olive argue that the Atacini were indigenous inhabitants of the Aude region. Although apparently active between the 2nd and 1st centuries BC at the time of the emergence of Narbo Martius, they do not bear any of the tribal names attested in the area through coin legends, such as Neroncen, Seloncen, Bineken, and Longostaletes. Instead, they are designated by a geographical name derived from the river Atax, first attested in Strabo (1st c. AD). They suggest that this reflects the integration of several local groups into the colony, which Rome did not regard as significant enough to record under a distinct ethnic designation. The Atacini may therefore be counted among the "obscure peoples" mentioned by Strabo and Pliny, small communities of limited political importance occupying restricted coastal territories, such as the Sordones, Longostaletes, and Piscenae.

Michel Gayraud, by contrast, proposed that the Atacini designated the first generation of civilian settlers, later joined in the Caesarian period by veterans of the Tenth Legion (Decimani). He argued that the site of Narbo was shaped by long-standing Italic commercial presence from the late 3rd century BC onward, leading to a mixed community of Romans and indigenous populations by the late 2nd century BC. Members of this composite group may have been called Atacini and constituted the earliest settlers of Narbo.

The existence of a vicus Atax (possibly a district of Narbo near the Aude) was later mentioned by Suetonius in the 2nd century AD, likely to explain the cognomen of the Roman poet Varro Atacinus (82 – c. 36 BC) at a time when the meaning of atacinus was no longer clearly understood. As Varro belonged the first generations of settlers following the foundation of Narbo in 118 BC, his cognomen must be early and would have been meaningful only at a time when the identity of the Atacini was still known.

== Bibliography ==
- Gayraud, Michel (1981). Narbonne antique: des origines à la fin du IIIe siècle. Boccard. ISBN 978-8460000174.
- Ugolini, Daniela; Olive, Christian (2003). "Autour de la fondation de Narbo Martius : Atacini et autres peuples préromains de l'Aude". Revue archéologique de Narbonnaise. Suppl. 35: 297–302. ISSN 0557-7705.
