= Albiones =

Ancient people in northwestern Spain

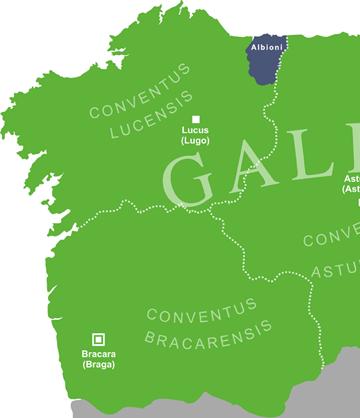
Map of Gallaecia

The Albiones or Albioni were a Gallaecian people living the north coast of modern Spain in western Asturias and eastern Galicia mentioned by Pliny the Elder. They are generally included in maps of Roman Spain.

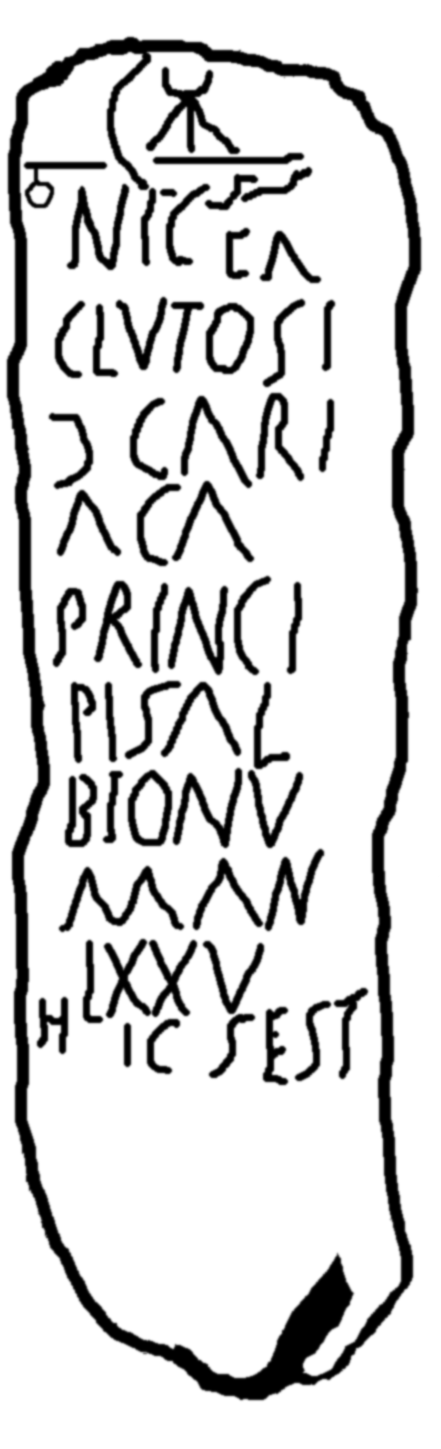
The Nicer Clutosi stele inscription.

The name Albiones is also attested on the "stele of Nicer Clutosi" found near Vegadeo, which has the inscription:

☧ NICER CLUTOSI (filius) C(astello) CARIACA PRINCIPIS ALBIONUM AN(norum) LXXV HI(c) S(itus) EST, which can be translated as " Nicer, [son] of Clutoso from the house of Cariaca, prince of the Albions, [died aged] 75 years, lies here."

This same area was settled by a group of Britons in the post-Roman period, from whom the region took the name Britonia or Bretoña, mentioned in ecclesiastical sources as Britonensis ecclesia ("British church") and an episcopal see called the sedes Britonarum - see the History of Galicia.
