= Late Basquisation =

Hypothesis about the presence of Basque speakers in north-eastern Iberia

Late Basquisation is a minority hypothesis that dates the arrival of the first speakers of the Basque language in northeastern Iberia from Aquitaine to the 5th or 6th century AD.

== History ==
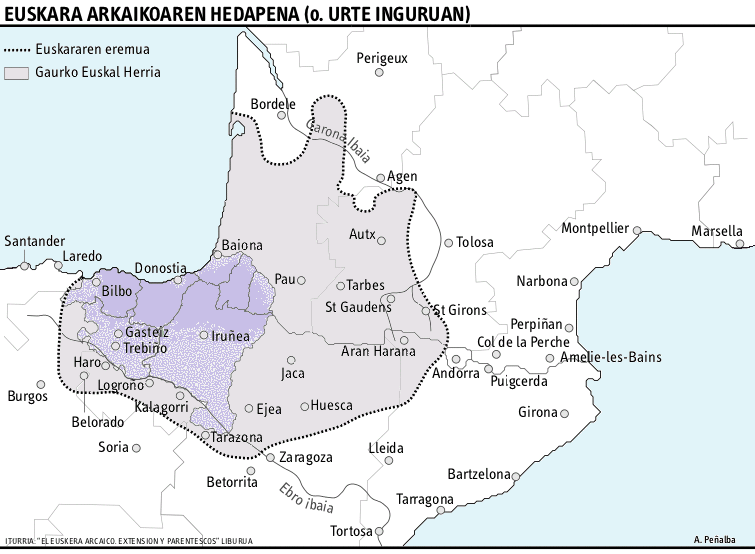
Approximate extent of the Basque-speaking area in the pre-Roman period, according to Luis Núñez Astrain

The Basque language is a language isolate that has survived the arrival of Indo-European languages in western Europe. Basque (and its ancestors or closely related languages such as Aquitanian) historically occupied a much larger territory, including parts of modern-day Béarn, Aragon, Rioja, Castile south of the Pyrenees, and large parts of modern-day Gascony to the north.

== Hypothesis ==
The "Late Basquisation" hypothesis set the historical geographical spread of the Basque or the proto-Basque language later in history. It suggests that at the end of the Roman Republic and during the first centuries of the Empire, migration of Basque-speakers from Aquitaine overlapped with an autochthonous population whose most ancient substrate would be Indo-European. The migration is alleged to have increased, with peaks in the 6th and 7th centuries.

In his 2008 book Historia de las Lenguas de Europa (History of the Languages of Europe), the Spanish philologist and hellenist Francisco Rodríguez Adrados has updated the debate by arguing that the Basque language is older in Aquitaine than in the Spanish Basque country, and it now inhabits its current territory because of pressure of the Celtic invasions.

== Claimed evidence ==
According to the hypothesis of Late Basquisation, on top of a more ancient autochthonous Indo-European occupation, evidence appears of important Celtic establishments in the current territory of the Basque Country (though apparently not in the Pyrenean valleys of Navarre). Both cultures coexisted, the Celtic elements being socially predominant, until the arrival of the Romans. This is observed all over Álava and Biscay, thus being concluded that the Caristii and Varduli were not Basque tribes or peoples, but that they were Indo-Europeans like their neighbors Autrigones, Cantabri, and Beroni.

The Late Basquisation hypothesis puts forward the following evidence:

- Abundance of ancient Indo-European onomasty before Romanization (as pointed out by María Lourdes Albertos Firmat).
- Absence of vestiges in Basque language prior to romanization, in stark contrast with Aquitaine.
- Deep romanization of the Basque depression (both the ager and the saltus, as indicated by Caro Baroja and Juan José Cepeda).
- Expansion of the Basque language in the Early Middle Ages.
- Homogeneity of the Basque dialects in the Early Middle Ages (pointed out by Luis Michelena).
- Archaeological vestiges (Aldaieta, Alegría, etc.)
- The genetic boundary between the Basques and their southern neighbors is quite abrupt, while it has a more diffuse character between Basques and their northern neighbors, which might indicate a displacement from Aquitaine to the south. (Cavalli-Sforza).

== Bibliography ==
- María Lourdes Albertos (1974) El culto a los montes entre los galaicos, astures y berones y algunas de las deidades más significativas. Estudios de Arqueología Alavesa 6:147-157. ISSN 0425-3507
- Agustín Azkárate (1993) Francos, aquitanos y vascones al sur de los Pirineos. Archivo Español de Arqueología. 66:149-176. ISSN 0066-6742
- Agustín Azkárate (2004) El País Vasco en los siglos inmediatos a la desaparición del Imperio Romano. En Historia del País Vasco. Edad Media (siglos V-XV):23-50. 84-9797-039-X
- Julio Caro Baroja (1945) Materiales para una historia de la lengua vasca en su relación con la latina. 84-7148-254-1
- Juan José Cepeda (1999) Dos depósitos monetarios de época altomedieval romana procedentes de Aloria (Álava). CSDIC: 215-228.
- Juan José Cepeda. 2001. El yacimiento arqueológico de Aloria.
- Iñaki García Camino. 2002. Arqueología y poblamiento en Bizkaia, siglos VI-XII.
- Manuel Gómez Moreno. 1951. De epigrafía vizcaína. Boletín de la Real Academia de Historia 128:210-217.
- Hector Iglesias (2011) « Sur l'origine présumée du fractionnement dialectal de la langue basque », Revista ARSE 45 (2011) : 65-95.
- Luis Michelena. 1988. Sobre historia de la lengua vasca.
- Claudio Sánchez Albornoz. 1976. Vascos y navarros en su primera historia.
- Theo Vennemann. 2003. Europa Vasconica - Europa Semítica. Trends in Linguistics: Studies and Monographs 138.
- Francisco Villar & Blanca María Prósper (2005) Vascos, celtas e indoeuropeos. Genes y lenguas. 84-7800-530-7
- Mikel Unzueta. 1994. Indigenismo prerromano en la vertiente cantábrica del País Vasco: fuentes documentales y contexto arqueológico. Illuntzar 94:101-112.
- Mikel A. Unzueta, J. A. Ocharan. 1999. Aproximación a la conquista romana del Cantábrico oriental: el campamento o campo de batalla de Andagoste (Cuartango, Álava). Regio Cantabrorum: 125-142.
