= Olivari =

Olivari is a surname of Italian origin. It may be a variation of the occupational surname Olivaro or a toponymic surname referring to Olivara, Avellino. This surname is typically received patrilineally or through marriage.

Notable people with the surname include:

- Achille Olivari (1894–?), Italian water polo player
- Alessandra Olivari (born 1964), Italian runner
- Antonio Olivari (born 1980), Maltese songwriter
- Carlos A. Olivari (1902–1955), Argentinian screenwriter
- Ivan Olivari (born 1987), Croatian alpine skier
- Luigi Olivari (1891–1917), Italian military pilot
- Quincy Olivari (born 2001), American basketball player
