= Geidumni =

Ancient Gallic tribe

The Geidumni were a small Belgic tribe living in Gallia Belgica during the Iron Age. They were clients of the most powerful Nervii.

== Name ==
They are attested as Geidumni by Caesar (mid-1st c. BC).

Jozef Van Loon has proposed emending the name to Geldumni, noting that confusion between ⟨i⟩ and ⟨l⟩ occurs elsewhere in the manuscript tradition of Caesar's De Bello Gallico. On this basis, the name Geidumni has been compared with the toponym Jodoigne (Dutch Geldenaken), attested as Geldonia in 1167 AD, and possibly deriving from an earlier Romance form *Geldumnia, borrowed from either Celtic or Germanic.

If of Germanic origin, the name Geldumni may combine the stem geld- with the Indo-European participial suffix -menos, yielding interpretations such as 'those who make themselves count' or 'those to whom payment is due'. However, since both elements also occur in Celtic, a Celtic derivation remains possible.

== Geography ==
Based on Caesar's account, their territory was located somewhere in the vicinity of Nervian territory. On the basis of Van Loon's linguistic comparison with Jodoigne, they may have been located in this area.

== History ==
During the Gallic Wars (58–50 BC), they are cited by Caesar as clients of the Nervii in the context of the Eburonian revolt led by Ambiorix in 54 BC, when the Nervii summoned their dependent peoples, including the Geidumni, to support an attack on another Roman winter camp after the destruction of the Fourteenth Legion near Atuatuca.

They therefore immediately sent messengers to the Ceutrones, Grudii, Levaci, Pleumoxii, Geidumni, all of whom were held under their control, then collected the largest contingents they could and swooped unexpectedly on Cicero’s winter quarters

— Caesar, Gallic Wars, V 39
