= Decantae =

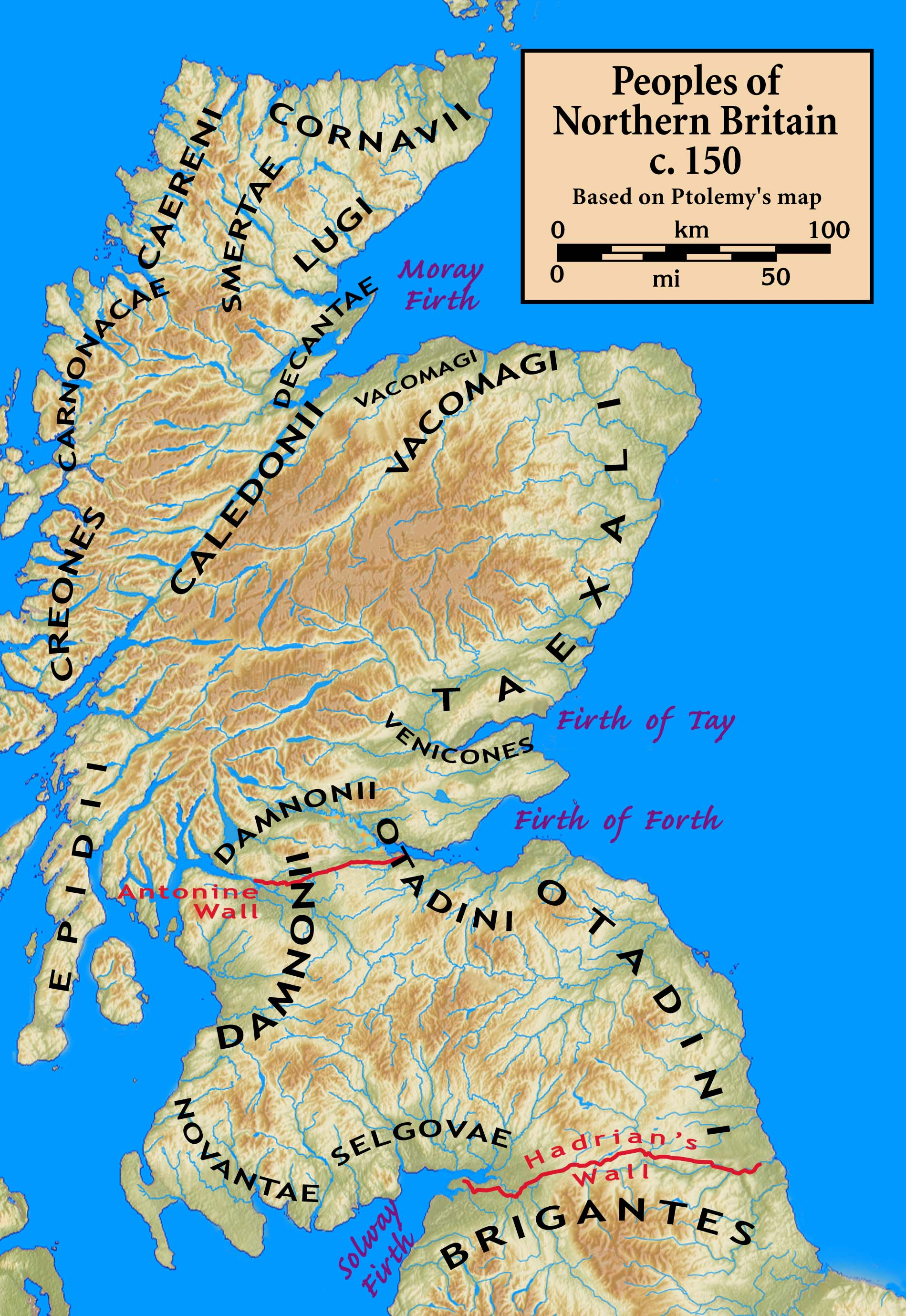

The Decantae were a people of ancient Britain, known only from a single mention of them by the geographer Ptolemy c. 150. From his general description and the approximate locations of their neighbors, their territory was along the western coast of the Moray Firth, in the area of the Cromarty Firth. Ptolemy does not provide them with a town or principal place.

The name has a base either in the Celtic root *deko-, meaning "good" or "the best". or *dekan- meaning "ten". There were similarly named peoples in Wales, the Deceangli and in Liguria, the Deciates, as well as a Gaulish personal name Decantilla.
