= Caereni =

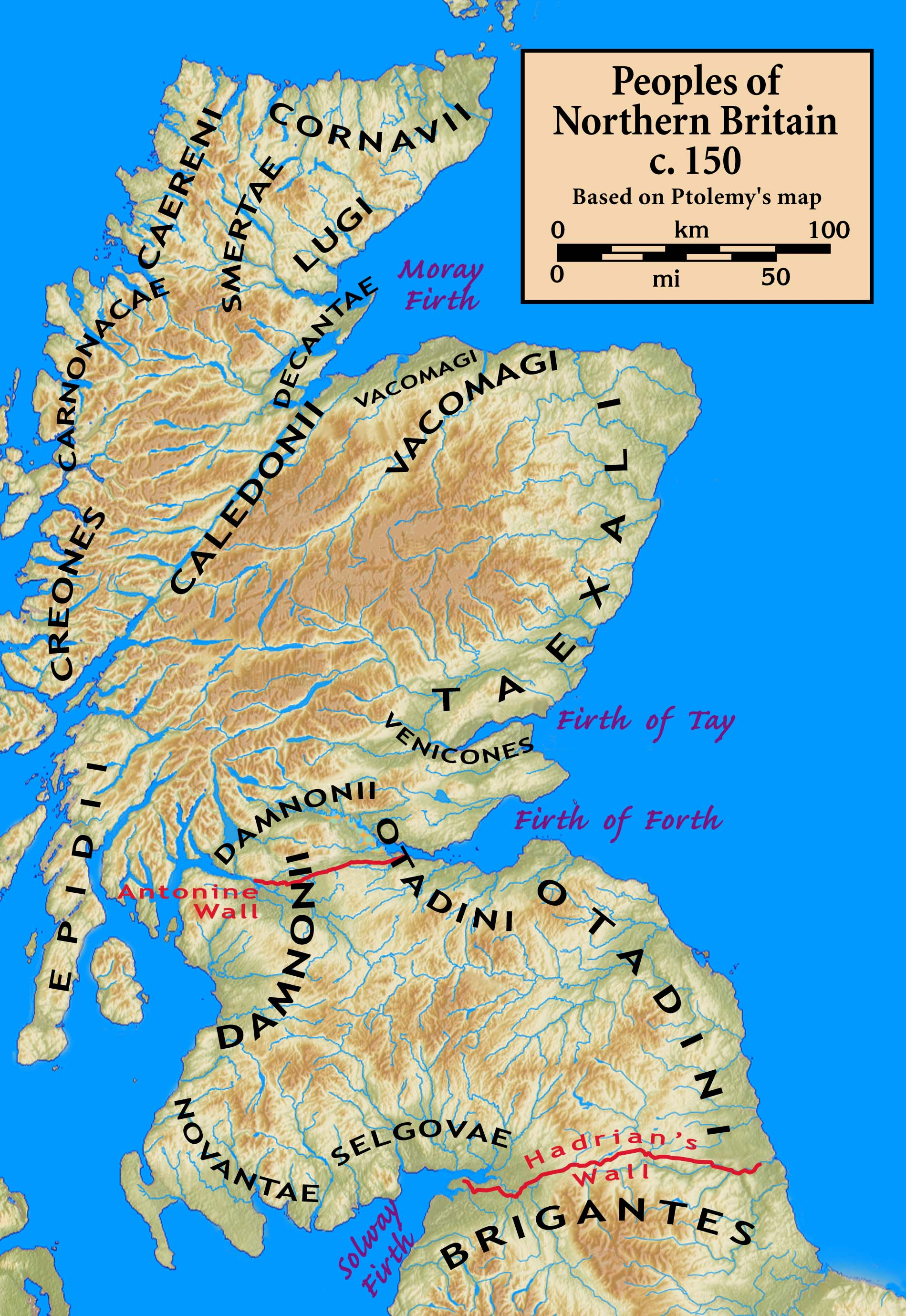

The Caereni were a people of ancient Britain, known only from a single mention of them by the geographer Ptolemy c. 150. From his general description and the approximate locations of their neighbours, their territory was along the western coast of modern Sutherland. Ptolemy does not provide them with a town or principal place.

The name may mean 'Sheep People', referring presumably to a pastoral way of life (cf. Gaelic caorach, 'sheep', Welsh caeriwrch, 'roebuck').
