= Manapii =

Ancient Irish tribe

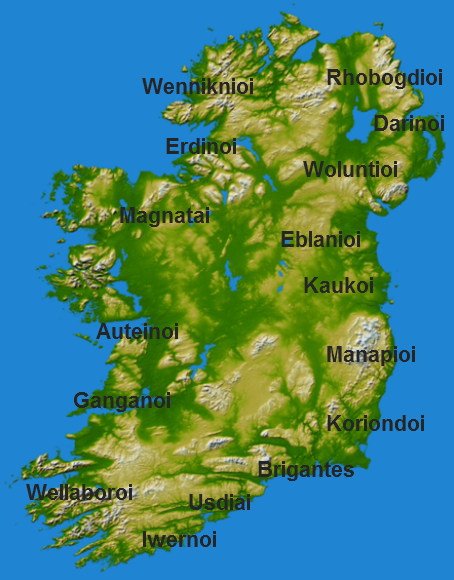
- Tribes according to Ptolemy
- Ethnicity: Celts
- Location: Ireland
- Religion: Ancient Celtic religion

The Manapii (Ancient Greek: Μανάπιοι) are an ancient tribe from southeastern Ireland mentioned by Greek geographer Ptolemy in the 2nd century AD.

They were later attested as (Fir) Manach (var. Manaig, Monaig) in the Early Christian period, a tribe dwelling further north in County Down and near Lough Erne which gave its name to the modern County Fermanagh. Early Irish genealogists mentioned that the Manaig had emigrated from the south of Leinster.

== Name ==
The ethnonym Manapii has been phonetically compared and associated with the Belgae Menapii tribe, living in northern Gaul at the Flemish North Sea. They were first recorded in the 1st century BC.

Those names may ultimately derive from a Proto-Celtic form reconstructed as *Menak^{w}ī or *Manak^{w}ī. The etymology is uncertain. It could mean the 'mountain people' or the 'high-living people', from the root *mon- ('mountain', cf. MWelsh mynydd, OBret. monid), or else derive from the root *men- ('think, remember'; cf. OIr. muinithir 'think', Welsh mynnu 'wish').

According to scholar Patrick Sims-Williams, the name Manapii may have been imported by settlers from Britain, for it shows a P-Celtic form that possibly came to be assimilated in the local Irish dialect as *Manak^{w}ī > Manaig.

In Belgium the etymology is accepted as meaning: the people living on or near water.
