= Catalauni =

Belgic tribe

The Catalauni (Gaulish: *Catu-uellaunoi 'war-chiefs') were a Belgic tribe dwelling in the modern Champagne region during the Roman period. The Catalauni probably belonged to a larger tribe, either the Remi in the north or the Lingones in the south. The Catuvellauni, who some people suppose to have migrated to southern Britain in the 1st century BC, are likely part of the same tribal group.

== Name ==
They are mentioned as Catalaunos by Eutropius (4th c. AD), and as (Cat)alaunorum in the Notitia Dignitatum (5th c. AD).

The ethnonym Catalauni is probably a latinized contracted form of Gaulish *Catu-uellaunoi ('war-chiefs, chiefs-of-war'), deriving from the stem catu- ('combat') attached to uellauni ('chiefs, commandants'). The name Catuvellauni, borne by a Celtic tribe of southern Britain, is thus likely related.

The city of Châlons-sur-Marne, attested in the 4th century as Durocatelaunos (Cathalaunum in 1185), is named after the Belgic tribe.

== Geography ==
They probably originally settled in the area of the Remi, within the modern Champagne region.

Their chief town, known as civitas Catalaunorum (modern-day Châlons-sur-Marne), is not mentioned before the 4th century AD.
