= Adunicates =

Gallic tribe

The Adunicates were a small Gallic tribe dwelling in the upper Durance valley during the Roman era.

== Name ==
They are mentioned as Adunicates by Pliny (1st c. AD).

The etymology of the name is unclear. If Celtic, it may be interpreted as a haplology (loss of syllable) of Gaulish *Andedunicates, based on the intensifying prefix ande-. In this view, it could be compared to the personal names Andedunis and Atedunus ('big fort').

== Geography ==
The Adunicates lived in the upper Durance valley. They are mentioned by Pliny as living near the Suetrii and the Quariates, north of the Oxybii and Ligauni.

On the coast too are Athenopolis of the Massilians, Fréjus, a colony of the eighth legion, called Pacensis and Classica, a river named Argenteus, the district of the Oxubii and Ligauni, beyond whom come the Suebri, Quariates and Adunicates.

— Pliny 1938, Naturalis Historia, 3.35.
