= Bibali =

- Village
- Location within Croatia
- Coordinates: 45°24′47″N 13°40′59″E
- Country: Croatia
- County: Istria
- Municipality: Buje

Area
  - Total: 4.8 km^{2} (1.9 sq mi)

Population (2021)
  - Total: 105
  - Density: 22/km^{2} (57/sq mi)
- Time zone: UTC+1 (CET)
  - Summer (DST): UTC+2 (CEST)
- Postal code: 52460 Buje
- Area code: 52

Bibali (Italian: Bibali) is a village in the municipality of Buje, in northern Istria in Croatia.

== Demographics ==
According to the 2021 census, its population was 105. In 2001 it had a population of 79.
