= Ambivareti =

Ancient Gallic tribe

The Ambivareti were a small ancient Gallic tribe living in what is now the region of Burgundy during the Iron Age. They were clients of the most powerful Aedui.

== Name ==
Aedui core territory (in red) and confederation (in brown), with allies (in pink) and enemies (in grey)

They are attested as Ambivareti by Caesar (mid-1st c. BC).

According to Xavier Delamarre, the ethnic name Ambivareti is derived from the Gaulish root uer- ('river'), which is also attested as uar- in place and river names.

Helmut Birkhan suggested that the similarity in name with the Ambivariti, located west of the Meuse in modern Belgium, could point to a common origin prior to subsequent migrations.

== Geography ==
The location of their territory, somewhere in the vicinity of Aeduan territory, remains uncertain.

== History ==
During the Gallic Wars (58–50 BC), they are cited by Caesar as clients of the Aedui.

From the Aedui and their dependents (Segusiavi, Ambivareti, Aulerci Brannovices, Blannovii) they ordered thirty-five thousand.

— Caesar, Gallic Wars, VII 75

He [Caesar] sent Gaius Antistius Reginus to the Ambivareti, Titus Sextius to the Bituriges, Gaius Caninius Rebilus to the Ruteni, each with a single legion.

— Caesar, Gallic Wars, VII 90
