= Nerii =

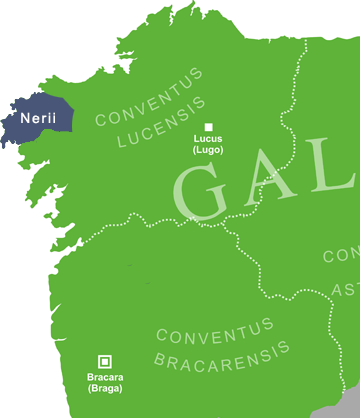

The Nerii were an ancient Gallaecian Celtic tribe, living in the north of modern Galicia, in the Costa da Morte region. Celtici Nerii are mentioned for the first time on a tombstone on the grave of a Galician nerio called Tássionos, in a Tartessian inscription from the Bronze Age.

[J.1.1] ‘Fonte Velha 6’ lokooboo niiraboo too araiai kaaltee lokoo|n ane narkee kaakiisiin|koolobo|o ii te’-e.ro-baar|e(be)e tea|siioonii ‘invoking the Lugoues of the Neri people, for a nobleman of the Celtae/Galtai Galicia: he rests still within; invoking every hero, the grave of Tasiioonos has received him.’ See John T. Koch A Case For Tartessian as a Celtic Language. ActPal X = PalHisp 9, 344.

== See also ==
- Pre-Roman peoples of the Iberian Peninsula
