= Roman conquest of Britain =

First century AD invasion of Britain by the Romans

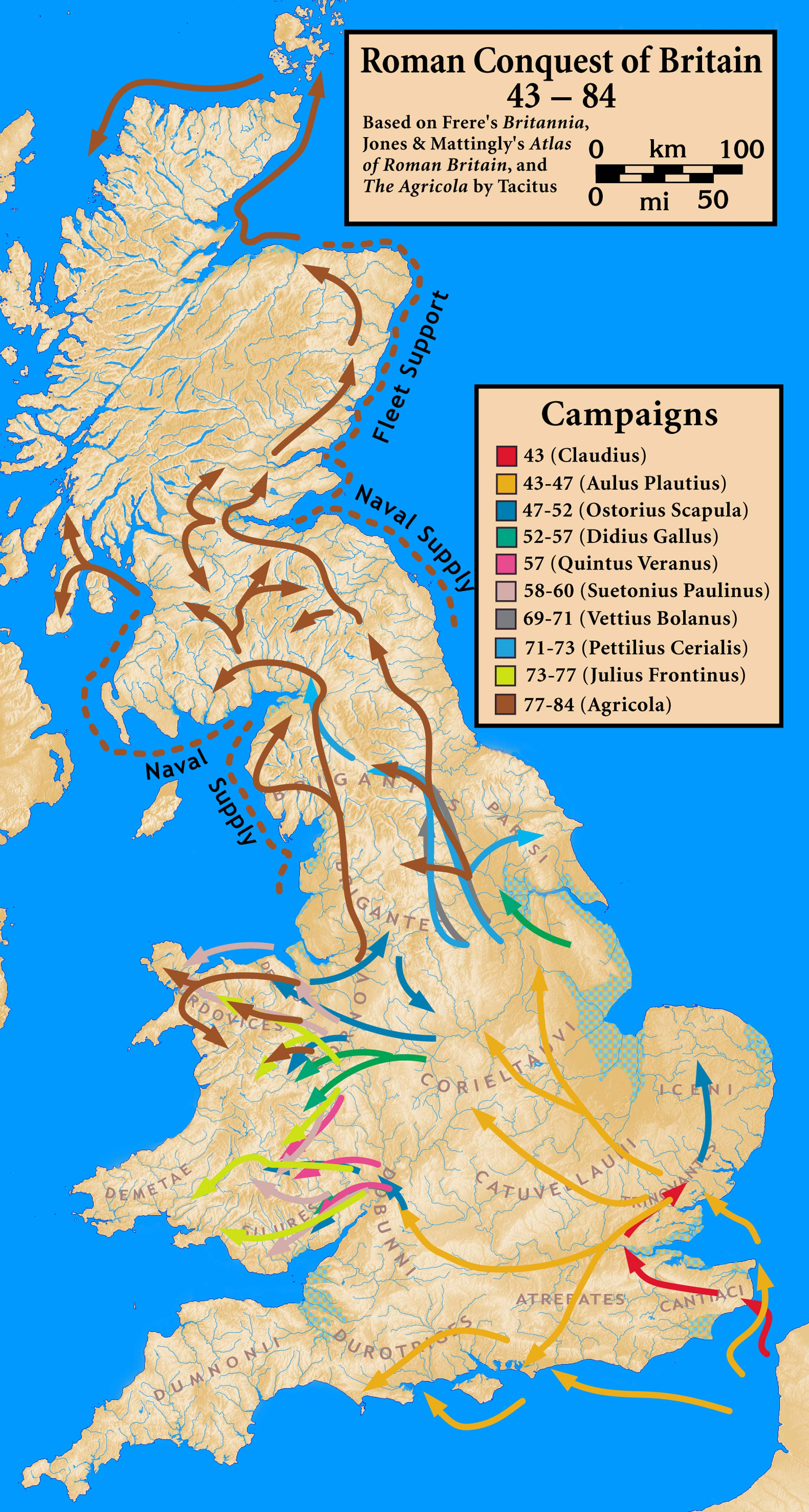
- Roman conquest of Britain, showing the dominant local tribes/kingdoms conquered in each area
Date	AD 43–84
Location	Great Britain
Result	Roman victory
Territorial changes	Most of England and Wales annexed by Rome

Belligerents
Roman Empire	Celtic Britons

Commanders and leaders
Claudius; Aulus Plautius; Gaius Suetonius Paulinus; Vespasian; Gnaeus Julius Agricola	Togodumnus †; Caratacus (POW); Boudica ‡‡ Calgacus

Casualties and losses
Boudican revolt: 30,000–40,000 killed (including 7,000 soldiers)	100,000–250,000 killed

The Roman Empire conquered most of the island of Britain, which was inhabited by the Celtic Britons. It began in earnest in AD 43 under Emperor Claudius, and was largely completed in the southern half of Britain (most of what is now called England and Wales) by AD 87, when the Stanegate was established. The conquered territory became the Roman province of Britannia.

Following Julius Caesar's invasions of Britain in 54 BC, some southern British chiefdoms had become allies of the Romans. The exile of their ally Verica gave the Romans a pretext for invasion. The Roman army was recruited in Italia, Hispania, and Gaul and used the newly-formed fleet Classis Britannica. Under their general Aulus Plautius, the Romans pushed inland from the southeast, defeating the Britons in the Battle of the Medway. By AD 47, the Romans held the lands southeast of the Fosse Way. British resistance was led by the chieftain Caratacus until his defeat in AD 50. The isle of Mona, a stronghold of the druids, was attacked in AD 60. This was interrupted by an uprising led by Boudica, in which the Britons destroyed Camulodunum, Verulamium and Londinium. The Romans put down the rebellion by AD 61.

The conquest of Wales lasted until c. AD 77. Roman general Gnaeus Julius Agricola conquered much of northern Britain during the following seven years. In AD 84, Agricola defeated a Caledonian army, led by Calgacus, at the Battle of Mons Graupius. However, the Romans soon withdrew from northern Britain. After Hadrian's Wall was established as the northern border, tribes in the region repeatedly rebelled against Roman rule and forts continued to be maintained across northern Britain to protect against these attacks.

== Background ==
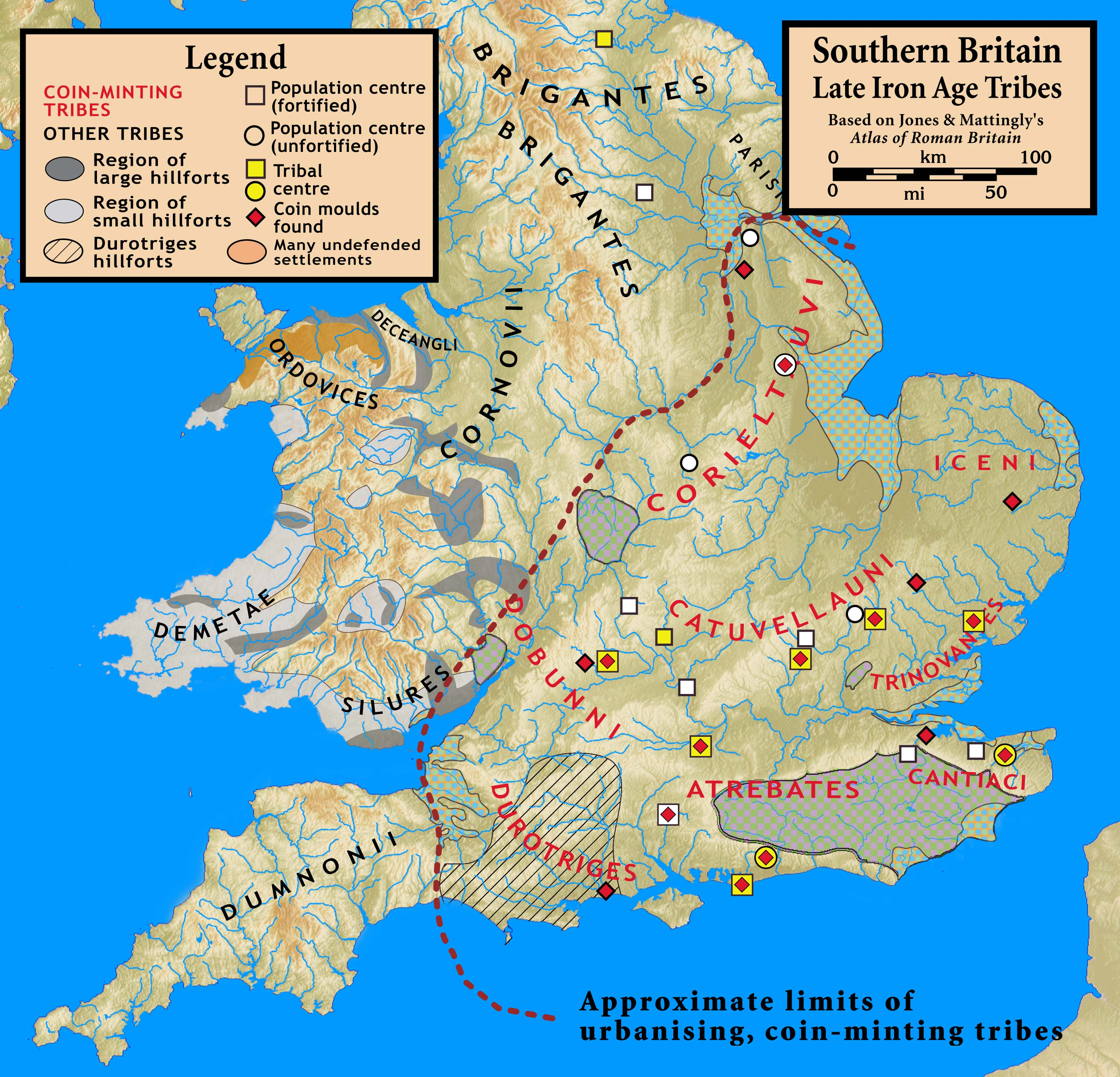
Southern British tribes before the Roman invasion

In common with other regions on the edge of the empire, British tribes had enjoyed diplomatic and trading links with the Romans in the century since Julius Caesar's expeditions in 55 and 54 BC, and Roman economic and cultural influence was a significant part of the British late pre-Roman Iron Age, especially in the south.

Between 55 BC and the 40s AD, the status quo of tribute, hostages, and client states without direct military occupation, begun by Caesar's invasions of Britain, largely remained intact. Augustus prepared invasions in 34 BC, 27 BC and 25 BC. The first and third were called off due to revolts elsewhere in the empire, the second because the Britons seemed ready to come to terms. According to Augustus's Res Gestae, two British kings, Dubnovellaunus and Tincomarus, fled to Rome as supplicants during his reign, and Strabo's Geographica, written during this period, says Britain paid more in customs and duties than could be raised by taxation if the island were conquered.

By 40 AD, the political situation within Britain was in ferment. The Catuvellauni had displaced the Trinovantes as the most powerful kingdom in south-eastern Britain, taking over the former Trinovantian capital of Camulodunum (Colchester). The Atrebates tribe whose capital was at Calleva Atrebatum (Silchester) had friendly trade and diplomatic links with Rome and Verica was recognised by Rome as their king, but Caratacus' Catuvellauni conquered the entire kingdom some time after AD 40 and Verica was expelled from Britain.

Caligula may have planned a campaign against the Britons in AD 40, but its execution was unclear: according to Suetonius' The Twelve Caesars, he drew up his troops in battle formation facing the English Channel and, once his forces had become quite confused, ordered them to gather seashells, referring to them as "plunder from the ocean due to the Capitol and the Palace". Alternatively, he may have told them to gather "huts", since the word musculi was also soldier's slang for engineers' huts and Caligula himself was very familiar with the Empire's soldiers. In any case this readied the troops and facilities that would make Claudius' invasion possible three years later. For example, Caligula built a lighthouse at Bononia (modern Boulogne-sur-Mer), the Tour d'Ordre, that provided a model for the one built soon after at Dubris (Dover).

== Preparations for the invasion under Claudius ==
In 43, possibly by reassembling Caligula's troops from 40, Claudius mounted an invasion force under overall charge of Aulus Plautius, a distinguished senator. A pretext of the invasion was to reinstate Verica, the exiled king of the Atrebates.

It is unclear how many legions were sent: only the Legio II Augusta, commanded by future emperor Vespasian, was directly attested to have taken part.

The IX Hispana, the XIV Gemina (later styled Martia Victrix) and the XX (later styled Valeria Victrix) are known to have served during the Boudican revolt of 60–61, and were probably there since the initial invasion, but the Roman army was flexible, with cohorts and auxiliary units being moved around whenever necessary.

Three other men of appropriate rank to command legions are known from the sources to have been involved in the invasion. Cassius Dio mentions Gnaeus Hosidius Geta, who probably led the IX Hispana, and Vespasian's brother Titus Flavius Sabinus the Younger. He wrote that Sabinus was Vespasian's lieutenant, but as Sabinus was the older brother and preceded Vespasian into public life, he could hardly have been a military tribune. Eutropius mentions Gnaeus Sentius Saturninus, although as a former consul he may have been too senior, and perhaps accompanied Claudius later.

== Crossing and landing ==
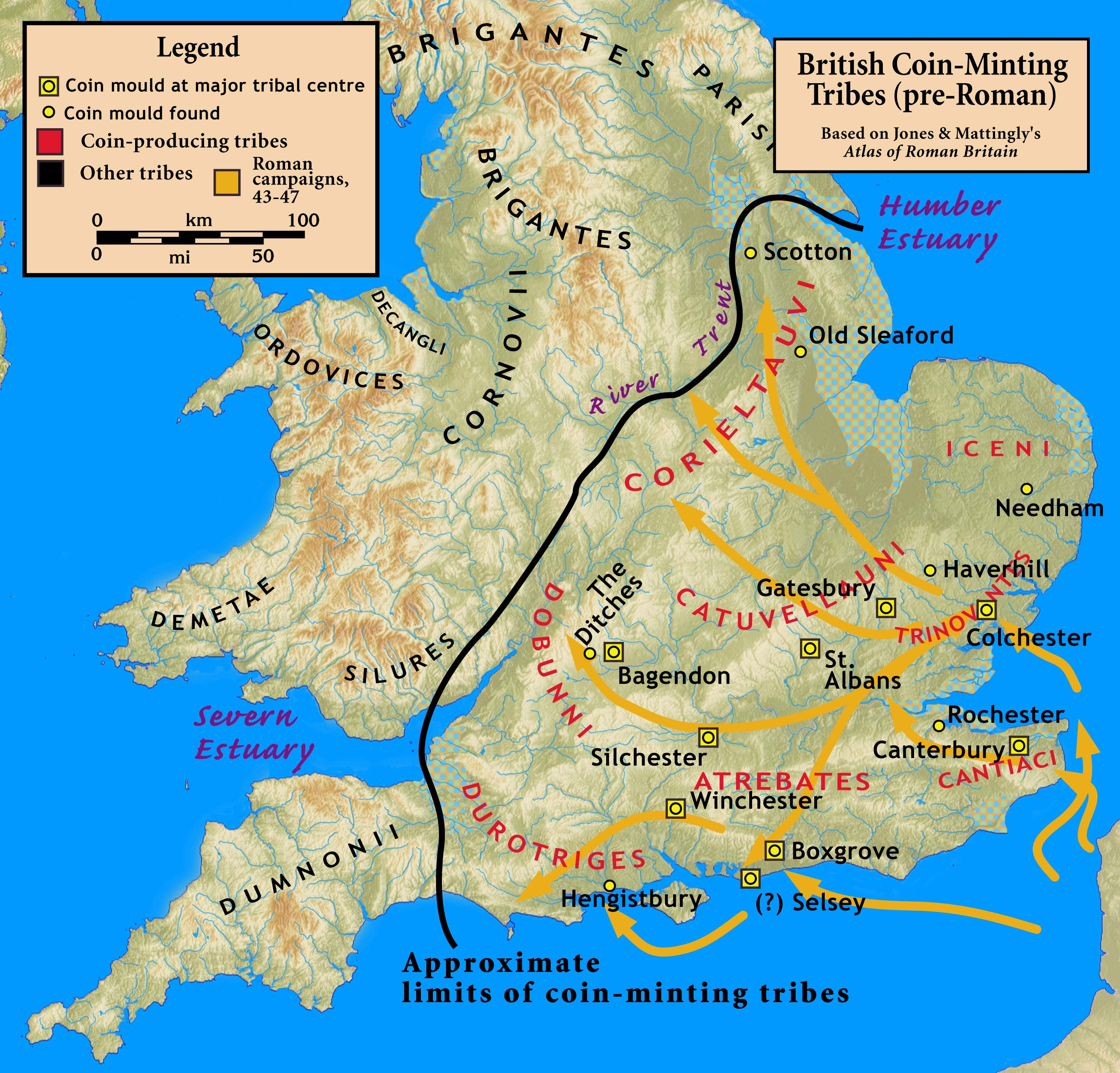
Campaigns under Aulus Plautius and the British tribes

The main invasion force under Aulus Plautius crossed in three divisions. The port of departure is usually taken to have been Bononia (Boulogne), and the main landing at Rutupiae (Richborough, on the east coast of Kent). Neither of these locations is certain. Dio does not mention the port of departure, and although Suetonius says that the secondary force under Claudius sailed from Boulogne, it does not necessarily follow that the entire invasion force did. Richborough had a large natural harbour, which would have been suitable, and archaeology shows Roman military occupation at about the right time. However, Dio says the Romans sailed east to west, and a journey from Boulogne to Richborough is south to north. Some historians suggest a sailing from Boulogne to the Solent, landing in the vicinity of Noviomagus (Chichester) or Southampton, in territory formerly ruled by Verica.

== River battles ==
British resistance was led by Togodumnus and Caratacus, sons of the late king of the Catuvellauni, Cunobeline. A substantial British force met the Romans at a river crossing thought to be near Rochester on the River Medway. The Battle of the Medway raged for two days. Gnaeus Hosidius Geta was almost captured, but recovered and turned the battle so decisively that he was awarded the Roman triumph. At least one division of auxiliary Batavian troops swam across the river as a separate force.

The British were pushed back to the Thames. They were pursued by the Romans across the river, causing some Roman losses in the marshes of Essex. Whether the Romans made use of an existing bridge for this purpose or built a temporary one is uncertain.

Togodumnus died shortly after the battle on the Thames. Plautius halted and sent word for Claudius to join him for the final push. Cassius Dio presents this as Plautius needing the emperor's assistance to defeat the resurgent British, who were determined to avenge Togodumnus. However, Claudius was no military man. The Praetorian cohorts accompanied Emperor Claudius to Britain in AD 43. The Arch of Claudius in Rome says he received the surrender of eleven British kings with no losses, and Suetonius' The Twelve Caesars says that Claudius received the surrender of the Britons without battle or bloodshed. It is likely that the Catuvellauni were already as good as beaten, allowing the emperor to appear as conqueror on the final march on Camulodunum. Cassius Dio relates that he brought war elephants and heavy armaments which would have overawed any remaining native resistance, though the claim Claudius brought elephants to Britain has been doubted by modern historians, and may refer to a military machine, perhaps a siege tower, instead. Eleven tribes of South East Britain surrendered to Claudius and the Romans prepared to move further west and north. The Romans established their new capital at Camulodunum and Claudius returned to Rome to celebrate his victory. Caratacus escaped with his family, retainers, and treasure, to continue his resistance further west.

After the invasion Verica may have been restored as king of the Atrebates; although by this time he would have been very elderly. In any case a new ruler for their region, Cogidubnus, soon appeared as his heir and as king of a number of territories following the first stage of the conquest as a reward as a Roman ally.

== AD 44–60 ==
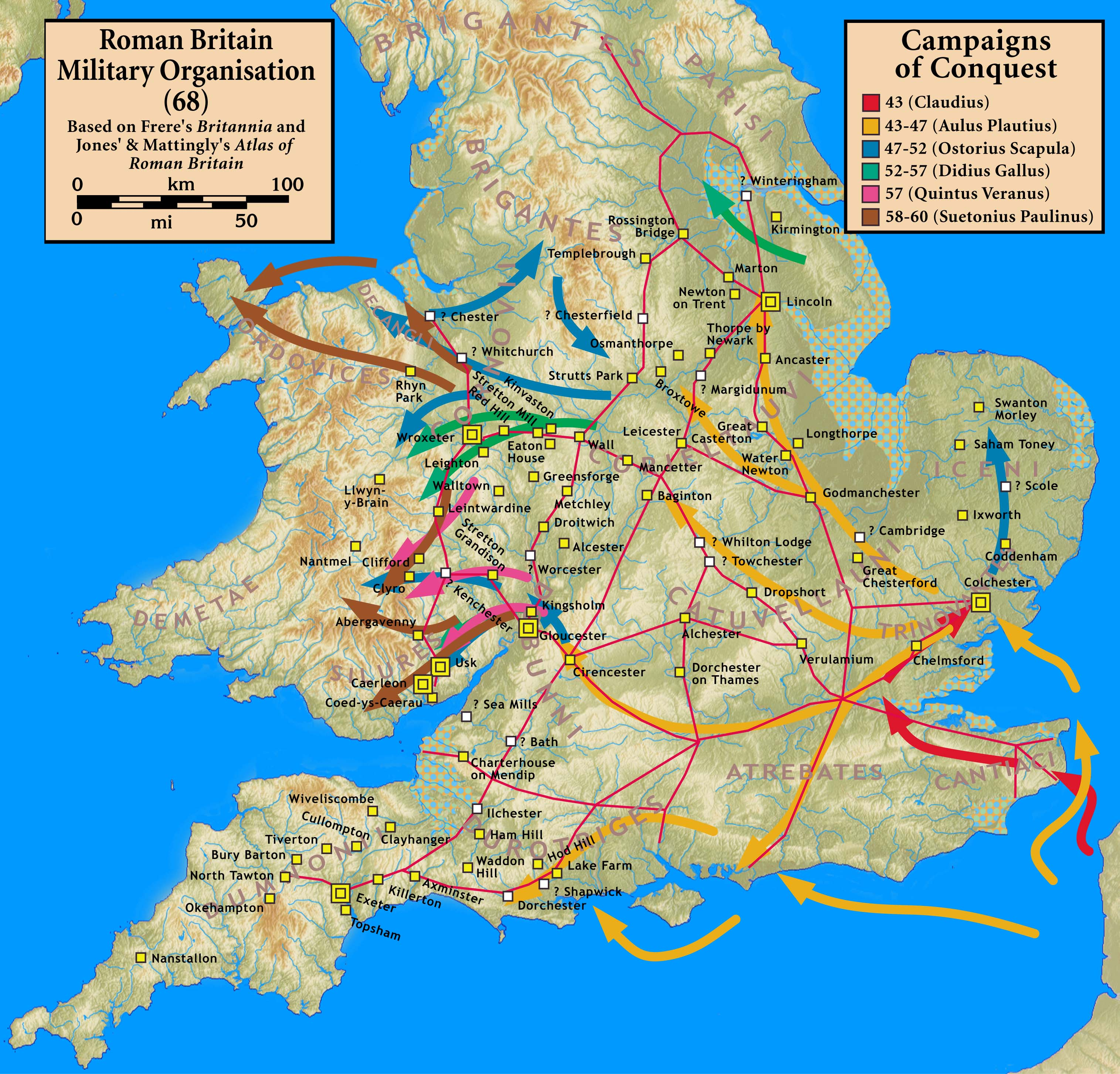
Roman campaigns from AD 43 to 60

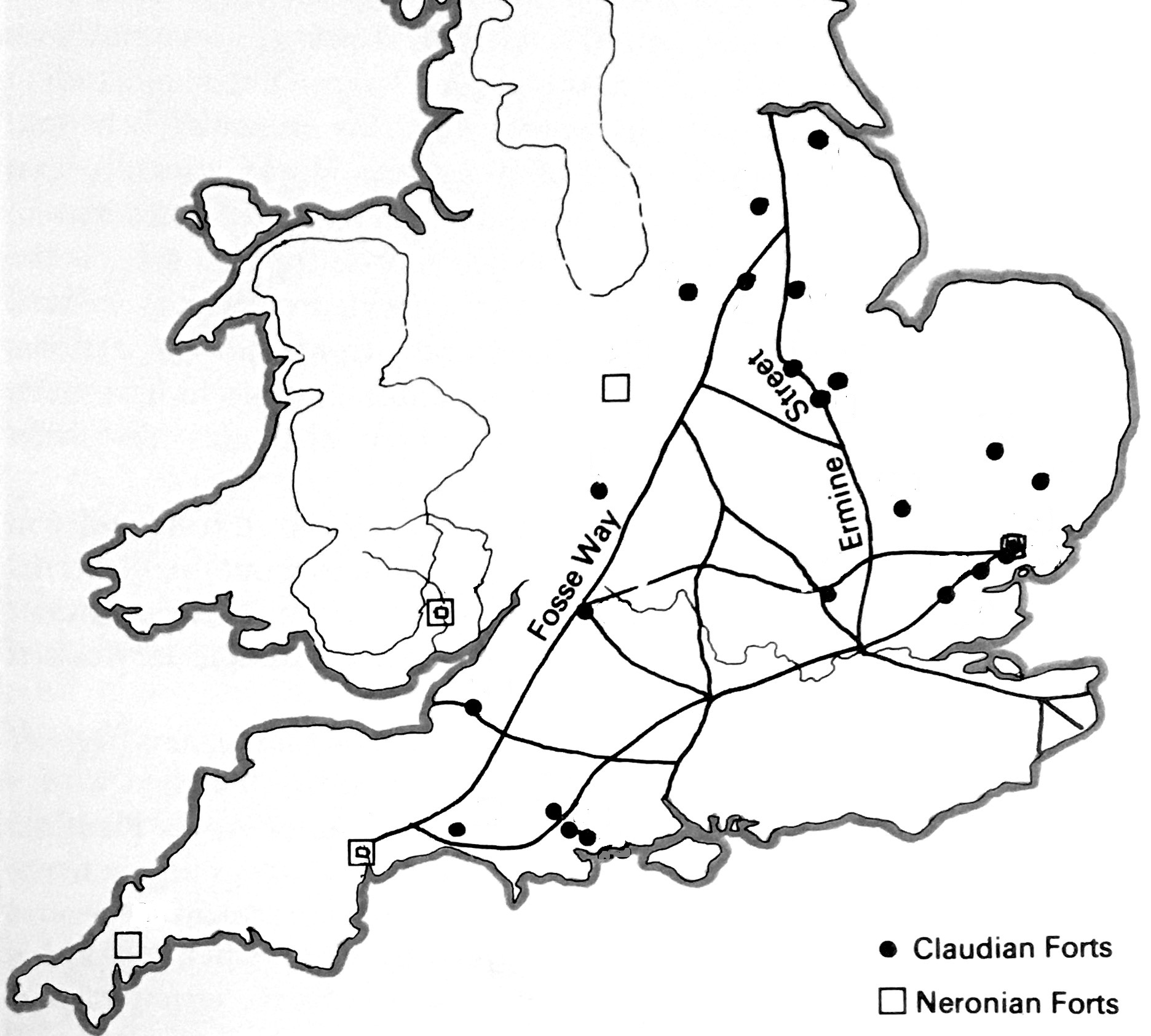
Forts of the conquest period of Roman Britain

Vespasian took a force westwards, subduing tribes and capturing oppida settlements as he went. The force proceeded at least as far as Exeter, which became a base for the Roman legion, Legio II Augusta, from 55 until 75. Legio IX Hispana was sent north towards Lincoln (Latin: Lindum Colonia) and by 47 it is likely that an area south of a line from the Humber to the Severn Estuary was under Roman control. That this line is followed by the Roman road of the Fosse Way has led many historians to debate the route's role as a convenient frontier during the early occupation. It is unlikely that the border between Roman and Iron Age Britain was fixed with modern precision during this period.

Late in 47 the new governor of Britain, Publius Ostorius Scapula, began a campaign against the tribes of modern-day Wales, and the Cheshire Gap. The Silures of southeast Wales caused considerable problems to Ostorius and fiercely defended their border country. Caratacus himself led this guerilla campaign but was defeated when he finally chose to offer a decisive battle; he fled to the Roman client tribe of the Brigantes who occupied the Pennines. Their queen Cartimandua was unable or unwilling to protect him however, given her own accommodation with the Romans, and handed him over to the invaders. Ostorius died and was replaced by Aulus Didius Gallus who brought what are now the Welsh borders under control but did not move further north or west, probably because Claudius was keen to avoid what he considered a difficult and drawn-out war for little material gain in the mountainous terrain of upland Britain. When Nero became emperor in 54, he seems to have decided to continue the invasion and appointed Quintus Veranius as governor, a man experienced in dealing with the troublesome hill tribes of Anatolia. The legionary fortress at Usk was established in 55 BC as a base for Legio XX Valeria Victrix to try to pacify the Silures.

Veranius and his successor Gaius Suetonius Paulinus mounted a successful campaign across North Wales, famously killing many druids when he invaded the island of Anglesey in 60. Final occupation of Wales was postponed however when the rebellion of Boudica forced the Romans to return to the south east in 60 or 61.

== AD 60–78 ==
Following the successful suppression of Boudica's uprising in 60 or 61, new Roman governors continued the conquest by edging north.

=== Conquests to the North ===
The casus belli presented itself in 69 when Cartimandua queen of the Brigantes following a rebellion by her husband Venutius was forced to ask the Romans for aid, who evacuated her leaving Venutius in power. About Venutius one speculation is that he might have been a Carvetian and may therefore have been responsible for the incorporation of Cumbria into a Brigantian federation whose territory straddled Britain along the Solway-Tyne line; furthermore Cartimandua may have ruled the Brigantian peoples east of the Pennines (possibly with a centre at Stanwick, Yorkshire), while Venutius was the chief of the Brigantes west of the Pennines (or Carvetii), in Cumbria (with a possible centre based at Clifton Dykes). In any case Tacitus says that in 71 Cerialis (governor AD 71–74) waged a successful war against the Brigantes. He praises both Cerialis and his successor, Julius Frontinus (governor 75–78).

Much of the conquest of the north may have been achieved under the governorships of Vettius Bolanus (governor AD 69–71), and of Quintus Petillius Cerialis. From other sources it seems that Bolanus had possibly dealt with Venutius and penetrated into Scotland, and evidence from the carbon-dating of the gateway timbers of the Roman fort at Carlisle (Luguvalium) suggests that they were felled in AD 72, during the governorship of Cerialis. Lead ingots from Deva Victrix, the Roman fortress at Chester, indicate that construction there was probably under way by AD 74.

Nevertheless, Gnaeus Julius Agricola played his part in the west as commander of the legion XX Valeria Victrix (71–73), while Cerialis led the IX Hispania in the east. In addition, the Legio II Adiutrix sailed from Chester up river estuaries to surprise the enemy. The western thrust was started from Lancaster, where there is evidence of a Cerialian foundation, and followed the line of the Lune and Eden river valleys through Low Borrow Bridge and Brougham (Brocavum). On the Cumbrian coast, Ravenglass and Blennerhasset were probably involved from evidence of one of the earliest Roman occupations in Cumbria. Beckfoot and Maryport may also have featured early on. At some point between 72 and 73, part of Cerialis's force moved across the Stainmore Pass from Corbridge westwards to join Agricola, as evidenced by campaign camps (which may have been previously set up by Bolanus) at Rey Cross, Crackenthorpe, Kirkby Thore and Plumpton Head. Signal- or watch-towers are also in evidence across the Stainmore area: Maiden Castle, Bowes Moor and Roper Castle, for example. The two forces then moved up from the vicinity of Penrith to Carlisle, establishing the fort there in AD 72–73.

=== Frontinus ===
Frontinus (who was sent into Roman Britain in 74 to succeed Cerialis as governor) returned to the conquest of Wales interrupted years before and with steady and successful progress finally subdued the Silures (around 76) and other hostile tribes, establishing a new base at Caerleon for Legio II Augusta (Isca Augusta) in 75 and a network of smaller forts 15–20 kilometres (9–12 mi) apart for his auxiliary units. During his tenure, he probably established the fort at Pumsaint in west Wales, largely to exploit the gold deposits at Dolaucothi. He left the post in 78, and was later appointed water commissioner in Rome.

== Campaigns of Agricola (AD 78–84) ==
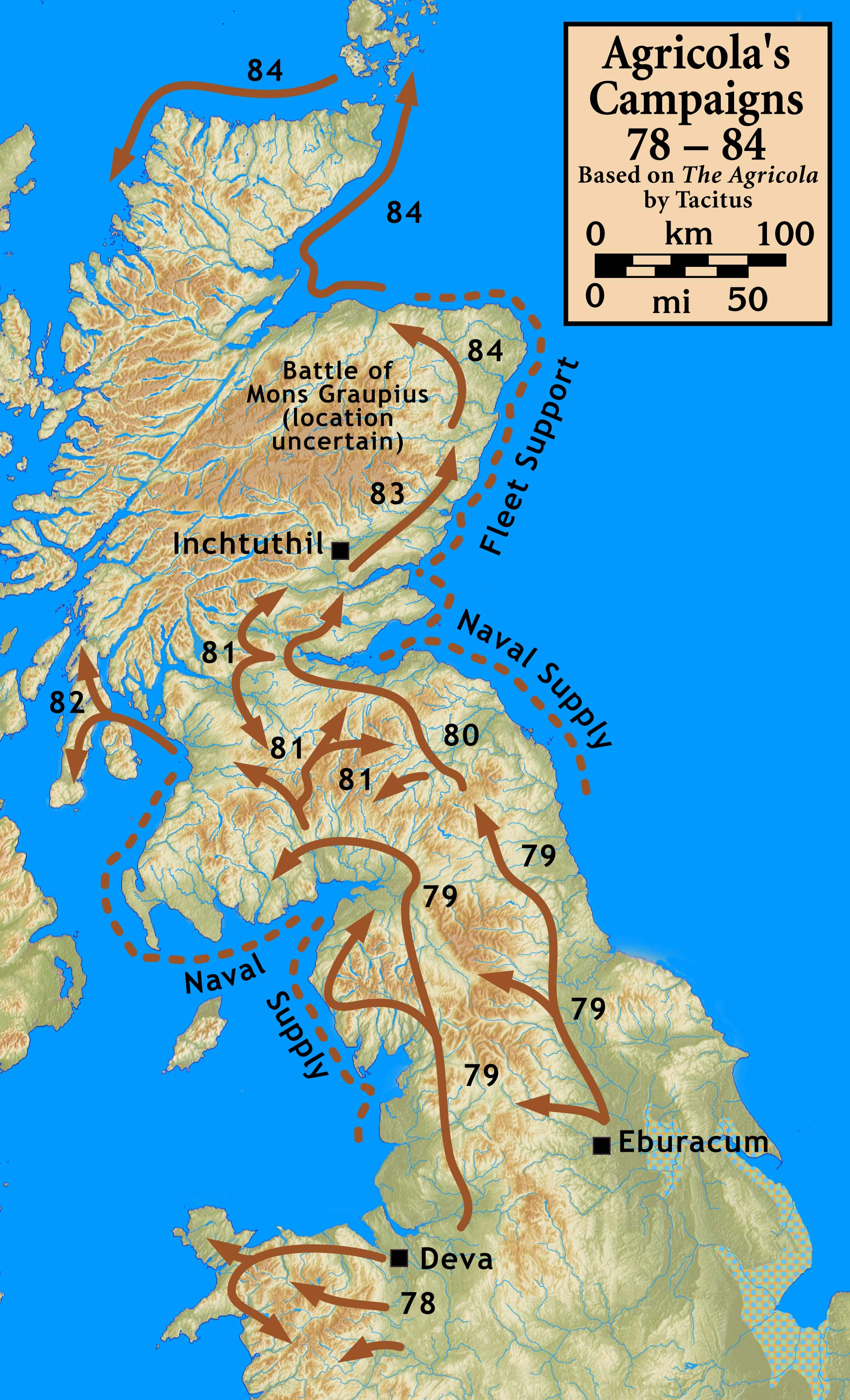
Agricola's campaigns

The new governor was Agricola, returning to Britain, and made famous through the highly laudatory biography of him written by his son-in-law, Tacitus. Arriving in mid-78, Agricola completed the conquest of Wales in defeating the Ordovices who had destroyed a cavalry ala of Roman auxiliaries stationed in their territory. Knowing the terrain from his prior military service in Britain, he was able to move quickly to subdue them. He then invaded Anglesey, forcing the inhabitants to sue for peace.

The following year he moved against the Brigantes of northern England and the Selgovae along the southern coast of Scotland, using overwhelming military power to establish Roman control.

=== Agricola in Caledonia ===
Tacitus says that after a combination of force and diplomacy quieted discontent among the Britons who had been conquered previously, Agricola built forts in their territories in 79. In 80, he marched to the Firth of Tay (some historians hold that he stopped along the Firth of Forth in that year), not returning south until 81, at which time he consolidated his gains in the new lands that he had conquered, and in the rebellious lands that he had re-conquered. In 82, he sailed to either Kintyre or the shores of Argyll, or to both. In 83 and 84, he moved north along Scotland's eastern and northern coasts using both land and naval forces, campaigning successfully against the inhabitants and winning a significant victory over the northern British peoples led by Calgacus at the Battle of Mons Graupius. Archaeology has shown the Romans built military camps in the north along Gask Ridge, controlling the glens that provided access to and from the Scottish Highlands, and also throughout the Scottish Lowlands in northeastern Scotland.

Agricola built a network of military roads and forts to secure the Roman occupation. Existing forts were strengthened and new ones planted in northeastern Scotland along the Highland Line, consolidating control of the glens that provided access to and from the Scottish Highlands. The line of military communication and supply along southeastern Scotland and northeastern England (i.e., Dere Street) was well-fortified. In southernmost Caledonia, the lands of the Selgovae (approximating to modern Dumfriesshire and the Stewartry of Kirkcudbright) were heavily planted with forts, not only establishing effective control there, but also completing a military enclosure of south-central Scotland (most of the Southern Uplands, Teviotdale, and western Tweeddale). In contrast to Roman actions against the Selgovae, the territories of the Novantae, Damnonii, and Votadini were not planted with forts, and there is nothing to indicate that the Romans were at war with them. Agricola was recalled to Rome in 84.

=== Archaeology ===
In 2019 a marching camp dating to the 1st century AD was found, thought to have been used by Roman legions during the invasion of Agricola. Clay-domed ovens and 26 fire pits dated to AD 77–90 were also found, loaded with burnt objects and charcoal contents. The fire pits were 30 metres (98 feet) apart in two parallel lines. Archaeologists suggested that this site had been chosen as a strategic location for the Roman conquest of Ayrshire.

== AD 84–117 ==
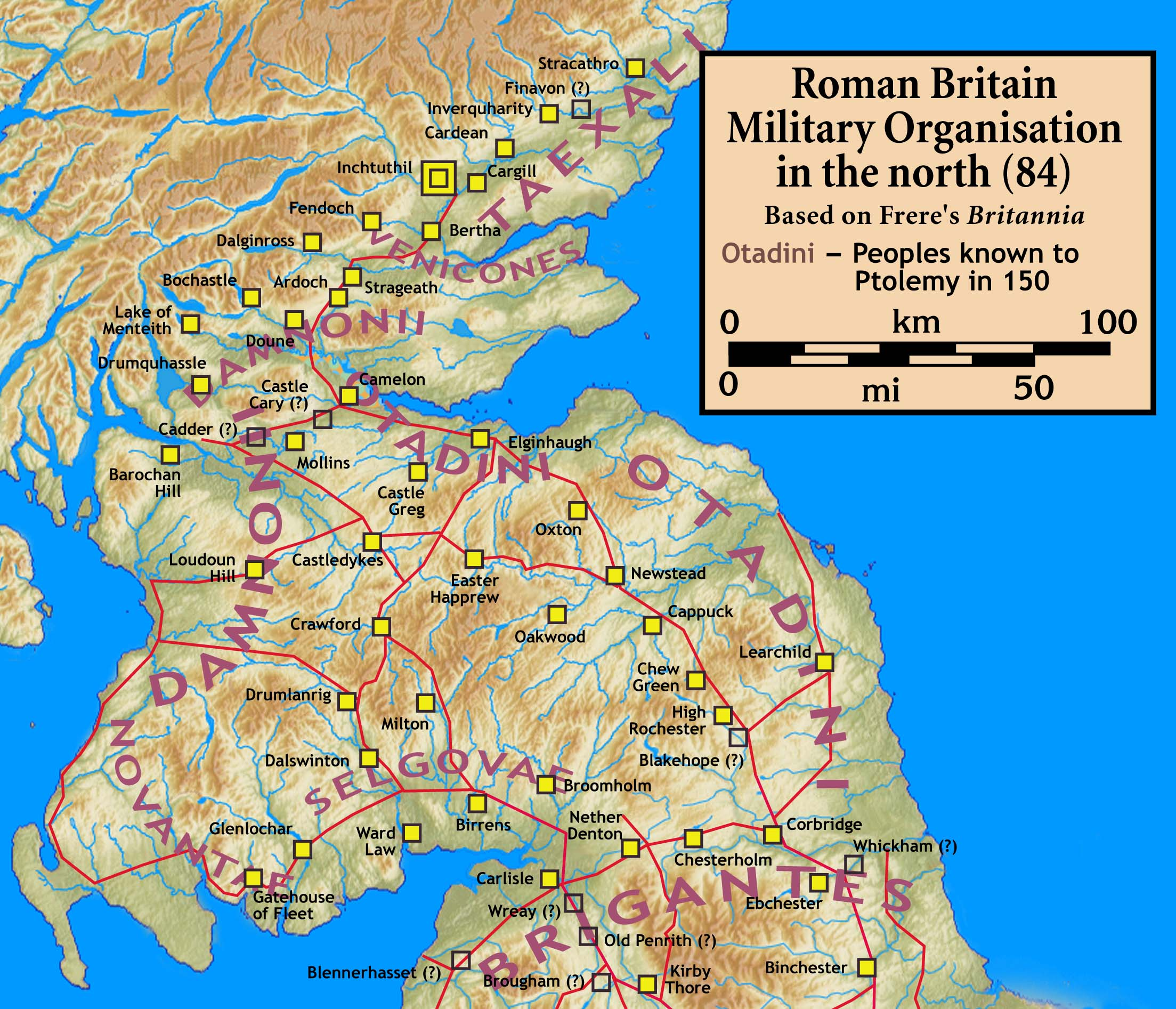
Roman military organisation in the north c. 84 AD

Agricola's successors are not named in any surviving source, but it seems they were unable or unwilling to further subdue the far north. The fortress at Inchtuthil was dismantled before its completion and the other fortifications of the Gask Ridge in Perthshire, erected to consolidate the Roman presence in Scotland in the aftermath of Mons Graupius, were abandoned within the space of a few years. It is equally likely that the costs of a drawn-out war outweighed any economic or political benefit and it was more profitable to leave the Caledonians alone and only under de jure submission.

With the decline of imperial ambitions in Scotland (and Ireland) by AD 87 (the withdrawal of the 20th legion), consolidation based on the line of the Stanegate road (between Carlisle and Corbridge) was settled upon. Carlisle was the seat of a centurio regionarius (or district commissioner). When the Stanegate became the new frontier it was augmented by large forts as at Vindolanda and additional forts at half-day marching intervals were built at Newbrough, Magnis (Carvoran) and Brampton Old Church.

The period from 87 to 117 was used for consolidation and only a few sites north of the Stanegate line were maintained, while the signs are that an orderly withdrawal to the Solway-Tyne line was made.

Modifications to the Stanegate line, with the reduction in the size of the forts and the addition of fortlets and watchtowers between them, seem to have taken place from the mid-90s onwards. Apart from the Stanegate line, other forts existed along the Solway Coast at Beckfoot, Maryport, Burrow Walls (near the present town of Workington) and Moresby (near Whitehaven). Other forts in the region were built to consolidate Roman presence (Beckfoot for example may date from the late 1st century). A fort at Troutbeck may have been established from the period of Emperor Trajan (r. 98–117) onwards. Other forts that may have been established during this period include Ambleside (Galava), positioned to take advantage of ship-borne supply to the forts of the Lake District. From here, a road was constructed during the Trajanic period to Hardknott Roman Fort. A road between Ambleside to Old Penrith and/or Brougham, going over High Street, may also date from this period.

== From AD 117 ==
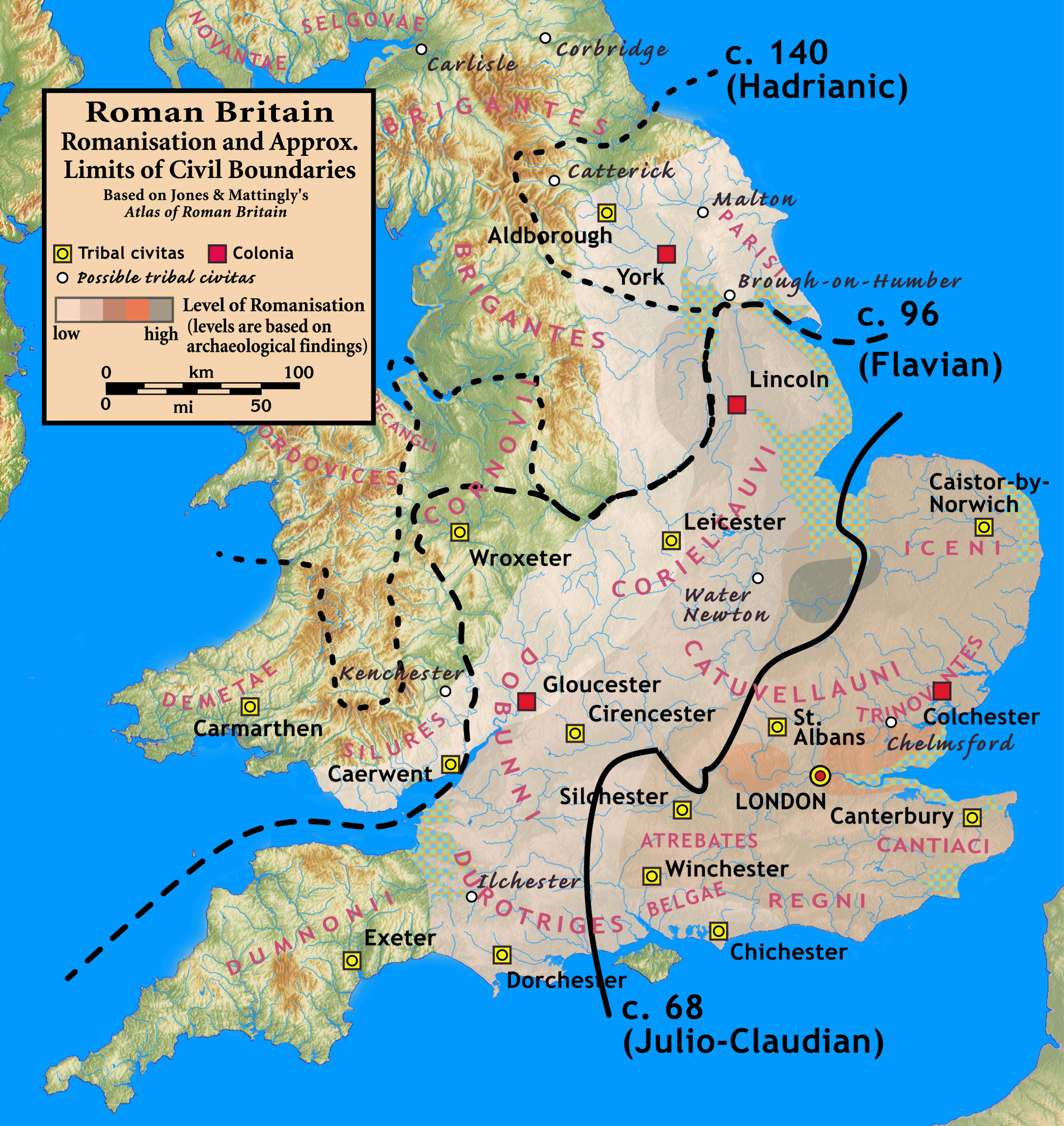
Levels of Romanisation by area and date

Under Hadrian (r. 117–138), Roman occupation was withdrawn to a defensible frontier in the River Tyne-Solway Firth frontier area by the construction of Hadrian's Wall from around 122.

When Antoninus Pius rose to the throne, he moved quickly to reverse the empire limit system put in place by his predecessor. Following his defeat of the Brigantes in 139 AD, Quintus Lollius Urbicus, the Roman Governor of Britannia, was ordered by Antoninus Pius to march north of Hadrian's Wall to conquer the Caledonian Lowlands which were settled by the Otadini, Selgovae, Damnonii and the Novantae, and to push the frontier further north. Lollius Urbicus moved three legions into position initially establishing his supply routes from Coria and Bremenium and moved three legions, the Legio II Augusta from Caerleon, the Legio VI Victrix from Eboracum, and the Legio XX Valeria Victrix from Deva Victrix into the theatre between 139 and 140 AD, and thereafter moved his army, a force of at least 16,500 men, north of Hadrian's Wall.

The Selgovae, having settled in the regions of present-day Kirkcudbrightshire and Dumfriesshire immediately northwest of Hadrian's Wall, were amongst the first of the Caledonian tribes to face Lollius Urbicus's legions together with the Otadini. The Romans, who were well versed in warfare on hilly terrain since their founding, moved quickly to occupy strategic points and high ground, some of which had already been fortified by the Caledonians with hill forts. One such was Burnswark Hill which was strategically located commanding the western route north further into Caledonia and where significant evidence of the battle has been found.

By 142 the Romans had occupied the entire area and had successfully moved the frontier north to the River Clyde-River Forth area when the Antonine Wall was constructed. This was abandoned in 162 and only subsequently re-occupied on an occasional basis. Meanwhile, the Romans retreated to the earlier and stronger Hadrian's Wall.

Roman troops penetrated far into the north of modern Scotland several more times. There is a greater density of Roman marching camps in Scotland than anywhere else in Europe as a result of at least four major attempts to subdue the area.

== 3rd and 4th centuries ==
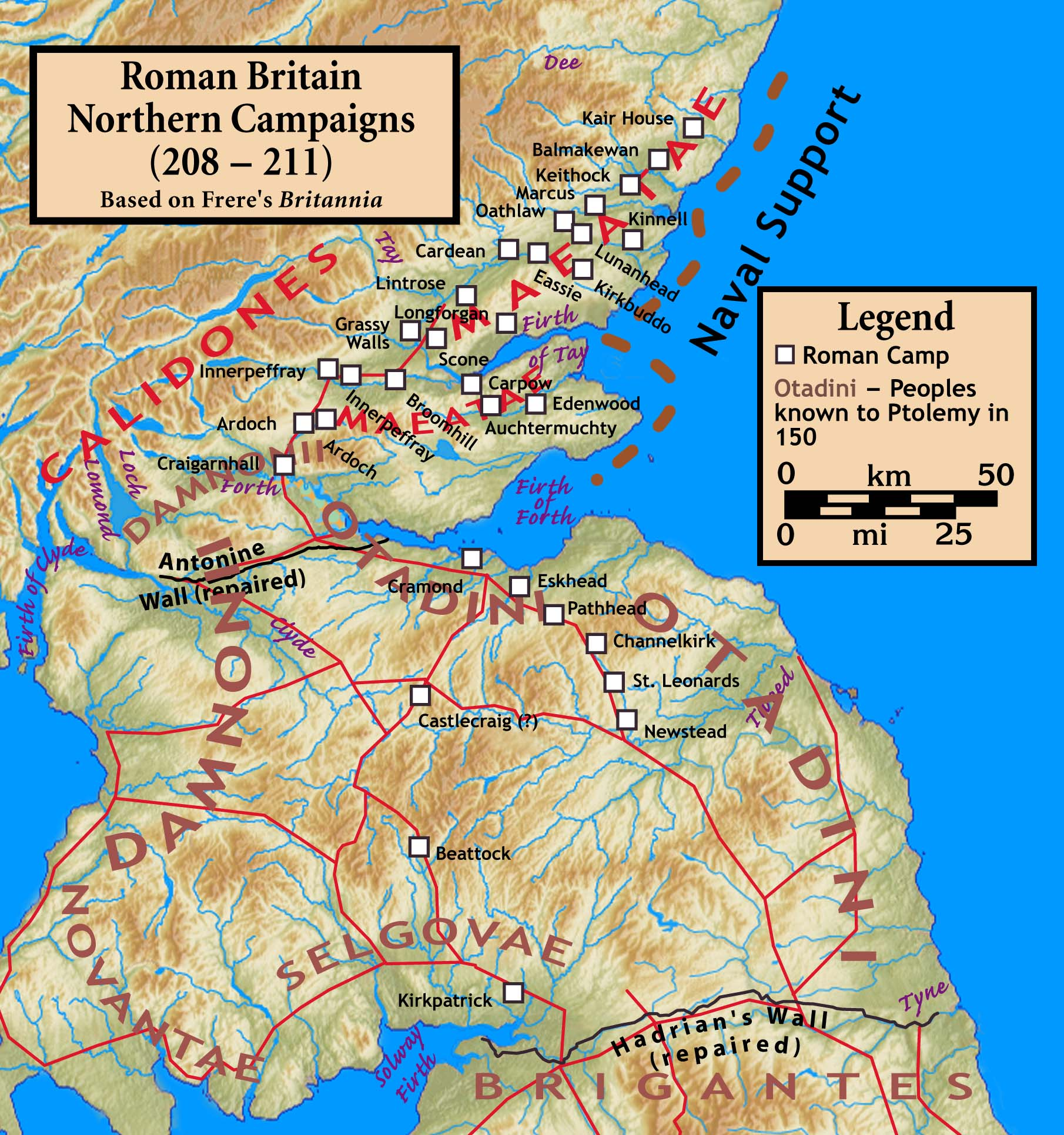
The brief Roman invasion of Caledonia (208–211)

The most notable later expedition was in 209 when the emperor Septimius Severus, claiming to be provoked by the belligerence of the Maeatae tribe, campaigned against the Caledonian Confederacy, a coalition of Brittonic Pictish tribes of the north of Britain. He used the three legions of the British garrison (augmented by the recently formed 2nd Parthica legion), 9000 imperial guards with cavalry support, and numerous auxiliaries supplied from the sea by the British fleet, the Rhine fleet and two fleets transferred from the Danube for the purpose. According to Dio Cassius, he inflicted genocidal depredations on the natives and incurred the loss of 50,000 of his own men to the attrition of guerrilla tactics before having to withdraw to Hadrian's Wall. He repaired and reinforced the wall with a degree of thoroughness that led most subsequent Roman authors to attribute the construction of the wall to him. During the negotiations to purchase the truce necessary to secure the Roman retreat to the wall, Septimius Severus's wife, Julia Domna, criticised the sexual morals of the Caledonian women; the wife of Argentocoxos, a Caledonian chief, replied: "We consort openly with the best of men while you allow yourselves to be debauched in private by the worst". This is the first recorded utterance confidently attributable to a native of the area now known as Scotland. The emperor Septimius Severus died at York while planning to renew hostilities, and these plans were abandoned by his son Caracalla.

Emperor Constantius came to Britain in 306, despite his poor health, with an army aiming to invade northern Britain, after the provincial defences had been rebuilt following the Carausian Revolt. Little is known of his campaigns with scant archaeological evidence, but fragmentary historical sources suggest he reached the far north of Britain and won a major battle in early summer before returning south. His son Constantine (later Constantine the Great) spent a year in northern Britain at his father's side, campaigning against the Picts beyond Hadrian's Wall in the summer and autumn.

Later excursions into Scotland by the Romans were generally limited to the scouting expeditions of exploratores in the buffer zone that developed between the walls, trading contacts, bribes to purchase truces from the natives, and eventually the spread of Christianity. The degree to which the Romans interacted with the Goidelic-speaking island of Hibernia (modern Ireland) is still unresolved amongst archaeologists in Ireland.

== See also ==
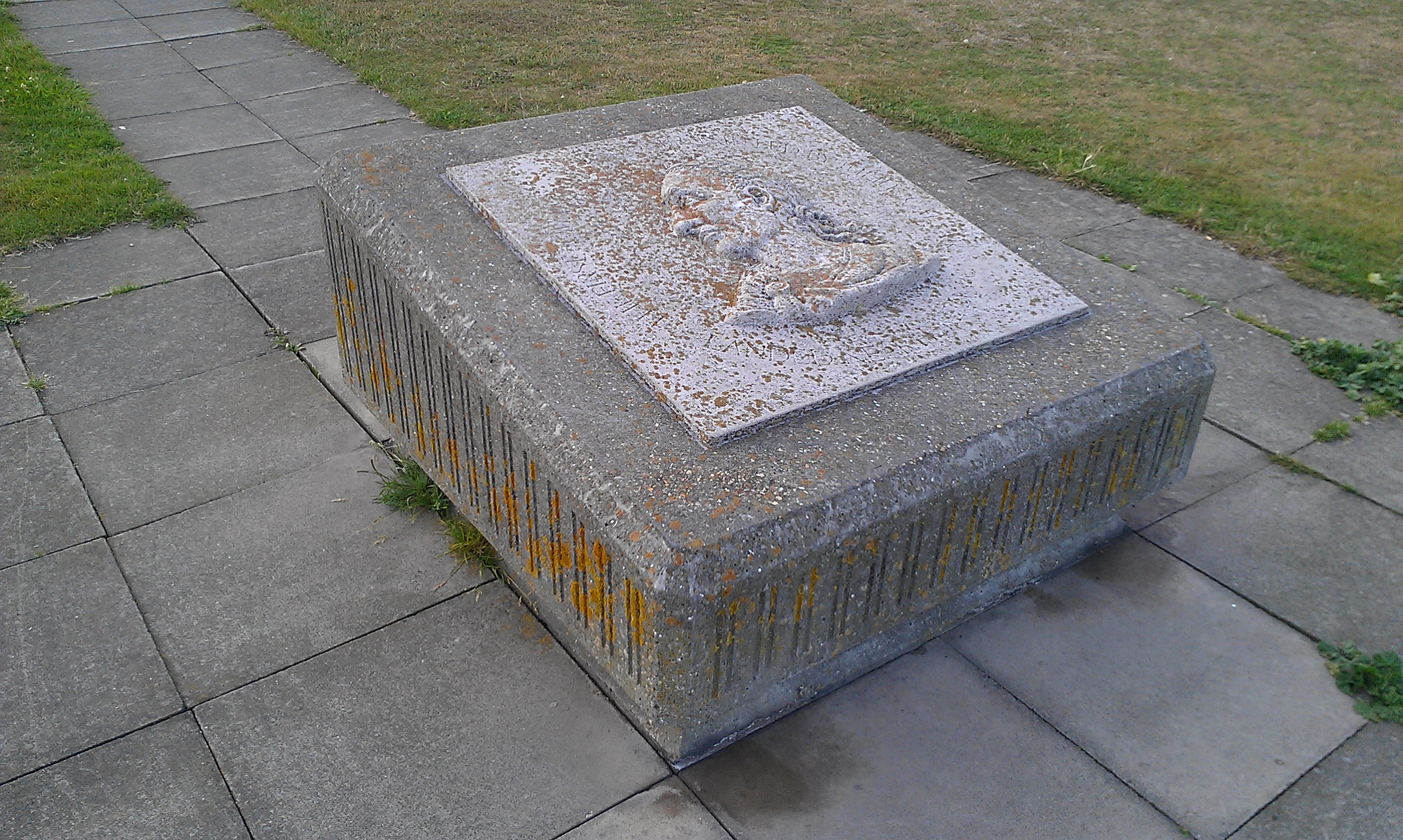
A modern monument to the Roman conquest, in Walmer, Kent.

- Ancient Britain
- British military history
- Roman governors of Britain
- Roman mining
- Roman sites in Great Britain
- Itius Portus
- Dogs of Roman Britain
- Esunertos
