= Burnswark Hill =

Battle fought between the defending Caledonian Selgovae tribe and Roman legions

Coordinates: 55.096873°N 3.276126°W

Siege of Burnswark
- Part of Roman conquest of Britain
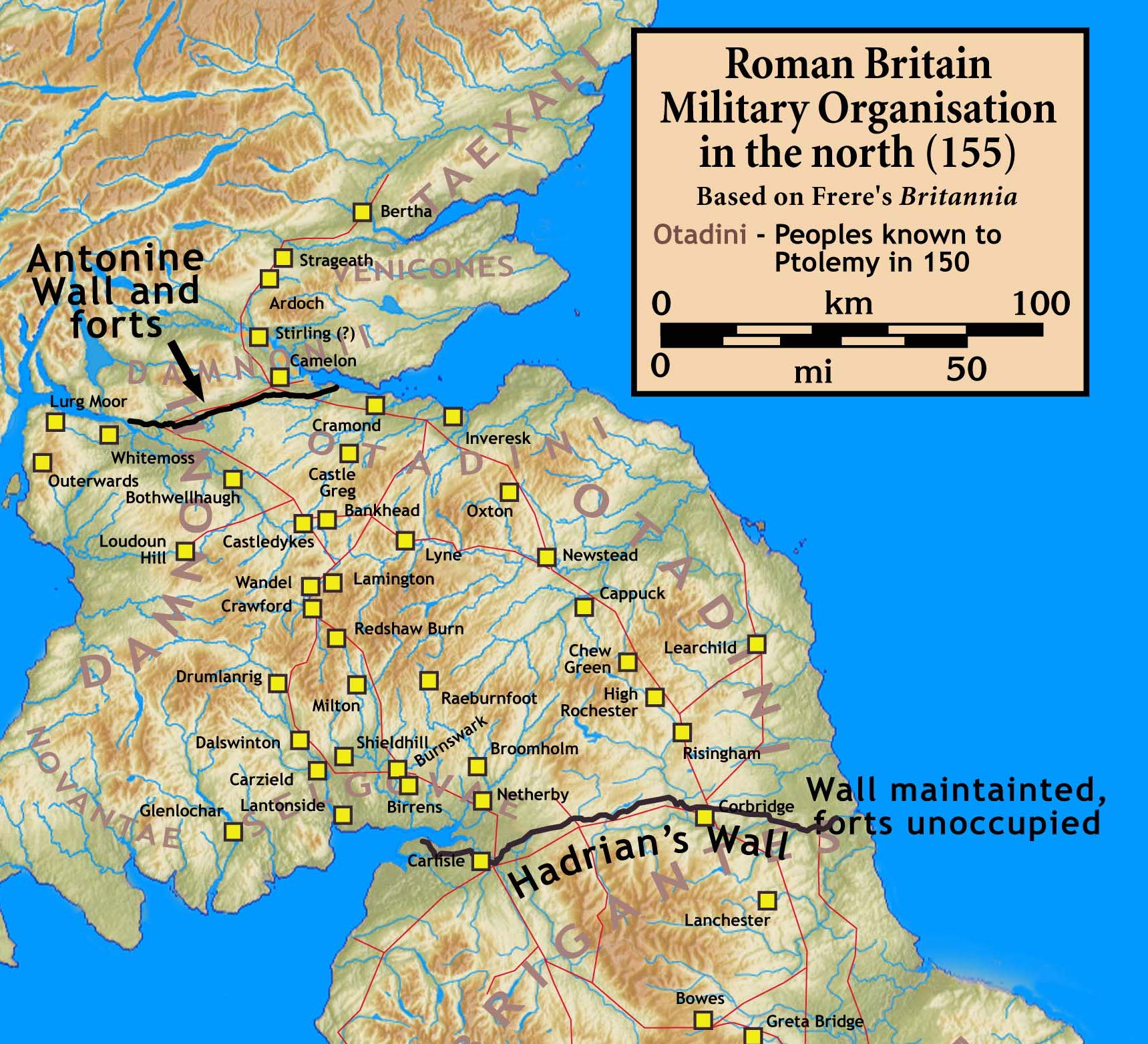
Date	140
Location	South-west Scotland
Result	Roman victory

Belligerents
Roman Empire	Selgovae

Commanders and leaders
Antoninus Augustus Pius; Quintus Lollius Urbicus	Unknown

Strength
6,000+	Unknown

Casualties and losses
Unknown	Unknown, suspected massacre

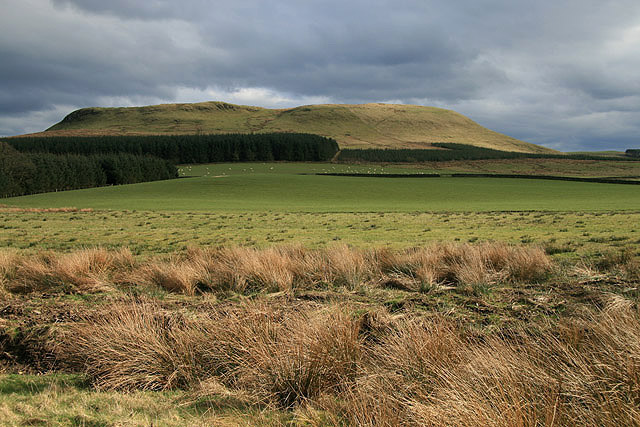
Burnswark Hill, Dumfries & Galloway

Burnswark Hill (also known as Birrenswark), to the east of the A74(M) between Ecclefechan and Lockerbie in Dumfries and Galloway, Scotland, is a prominent flat-topped hill, composed of basalt deposited some 300 million years ago as a local flow of lava. On this hill have been found an Iron Age hillfort enclosing some 7 hectares, Iron Age round houses within the fort, an earlier Bronze Age burial cairn, enclosures dated to the medieval period, a possible Civil War battery, and an Ordnance Survey triangulation station. Immediately adjacent to the base of the hill are two Roman camps, north and south of the fort, and a possible Roman fortlet (or pre-existing earthwork) within the South Camp.

Excavations have found evidence that the fortifications had collapsed or had been “deliberately felled” before about 140, when the site was bombarded by Roman sling bullets, arrows, and artillery missiles. While this was suggested to be evidence of Roman military training, it now seems likely that the missiles were left by a Roman assault, almost certainly as part of Quintus Lollius Urbicus' conquest of the Scottish Lowlands in about 140.

In November 1542, James V of Scotland rode from Lochmaben Castle to Burnwark Hill to watch fires started by the Scottish army. After learning of the defeat at the battle of Solway Moss, he returned to Stirling Castle.

== Possible training target ==
It has been suggested that the evidence at Burnswark does not suggest a siege designed to capture the hillfort, but rather the remains of a facility used to train soldiers in the use of slingshot and ballistae. The use of stone facings in the camps has been taken to suggest a more permanent structure and longer-term occupation than would be required to assault the hillfort. The lead sling shot was thought (incorrectly) not to have been used at such a late date. Other projectiles, stone balls, had been coloured red, possibly to help in their recovery for reuse. A "fortlet" in one of the Roman camps appears to have been built before the camp, suggesting that the Romans had previously controlled the area. Arrowheads have been found, on top of the ramparts and not underneath them, suggesting to their excavator that the ramparts had been made unusable before the siege, and that they were therefore not defended at the time of the bombardment.

== Military assault and Roman victory ==
However, none of the arguments above are definitive, and a military siege and assault is now accepted as very probable. Hundreds of sling bullets made of lead have been found; these would have been unsuitable for training because they cannot be seen in flight, and they would have been more expensive than alternatives of stone or clay. The "fortlet" has been reassessed as a pre-Roman earthwork, and the “hilltop could have served as a defensible refuge whether or not the old ramparts were intact”.

== Context ==
The strategic context is briefly mentioned, in a part of the ‘’Historia Augusta’’ generally held to be reliable, and recently excavated details have allowed reconstructions of many aspects of the assault and Roman victory.

After the death of the Emperor Hadrian, Antoninus Pius rose to the throne and moved quickly to expand the empire beyond the limits put in place by his predecessor. Following his defeat of the Brigantes in 139, Quintus Lollius Urbicus, the Roman Governor of Britannia, was ordered by Antoninus Pius to march north of Hadrian's Wall to conquer the Caledonian Lowlands, which were settled by the Otadini, Selgovae, Damnonii and the Novantae, and to push the frontier further north. Lollius Urbicus, a native of Tiddis in modern Algeria, had been one of a few senior officers selected by Hadrian to put down the Bar Kokhba revolt, which had been crushed with colossal loss of life and suffering. Lollius himself was awarded the highest military decorations, the corona aurea (gold wreath) and the hasta pura for his role in this campaign.

Lollius Urbicus moved three legions into position initially establishing his supply routes from Coria and Bremenium and moved three legions, the Legio II Augusta from Caerleon, the Legio VI Victrix from Eboracum, and the Legio XX Valeria Victrix from Deva Victrix into the area between 139 and 140, a force of at least 16,500 men, north of Hadrian's Wall.

The Selgovae, in the regions of present-day Kirkcudbrightshire and Dumfriesshire immediately northwest of Hadrian's Wall, were among the first of the Caledonian tribes to face Lollius Urbicus's legions together with the Otadini.

== Battle details ==
Warriors gathered at the ruined hill-fort of Burnswark, which commanded the western route northwards into Caledonia. If they re-fortified the hilltop, this is not evidenced by modern archaeology. Nevertheless, the Roman forces did not feel able to take the position by immediate storm; they set up camps either side of the fort, effectively isolating it. These two Roman camps were substantial fortifications for a siege, not intended for a few days occupation only. They could have housed around 6,000 soldiers, and their enemy may also have numbered in thousands. Whereas the defenders would have been armed only with simple weapons, swords, spears, and shields, perhaps some missile weapons, and a few might have had body armor, the Romans had good personal equipment including massed slingers and archers, they had effective siege artillery, and they had military training and discipline.

A swathe of hundreds of sling bullets has been found along the south-eastern side where the main entrances to the fort were located, with a smaller swathe along the facing side of the southern camp, possibly where the slingers stood to shoot, fumbling and losing a small proportion of their bullets in the process. Iron arrowheads and ballista balls have also been found on the south-eastern side of the fort, and just outside the southern camp there are three protective outworks (‘The Three Brethren’) about 3.5 metres high and 15 metres across, with ditches partly dug into the bedrock. These three are substantial defensive positions, larger than usual tituli, and they may have been places where ballistae were mounted.

This is compatible with a carefully prepared barrage of a variety of missiles, possibly intended to suppress enemy resistance while Roman soldiers advanced up the hill to melee combat. In that case, few defenders of Burnswark could have escaped death or enslavement.

== Aftermath ==
Near the Antonine Roman fort of Blatobulgium, (modern Birrens), finds include one of Britain's largest Victory inscriptions, dedicated to Antoninus Pius and an inscription recording detachments of two legions, XXII Primigenia from Mainz and VIII Augusta from Strasbourg, transferred to Britannia for the Antonine invasion. Two inscriptions by architecti have also been found in Birrens (less than 20 such inscriptions are known from the entire Roman empire); the skills of a Roman military architectus would have included constructing and maintaining siege artillery.

This was likely one of many battles that took place during the Roman campaign in the Caledonian Lowlands. By 142, the Romans had pacified the entire area and had successfully moved the frontier north to the newly built Antonine Wall.

== See also ==
- List of hill forts in Scotland
- Scotland during the Roman Empire
