= Damnonia =

Damnonia may refer to:

- Damnonia, land of the Damnonii, a Celtic tribe of Roman Britain in what today is southern Scotland
- Damnonia, a name of the Kingdom of Strathclyde, the early mediaeval kingdom that subsumed the Damnonii
- Damnonia, an alternative spelling of Dumnonia, the early mediaeval kingdom (named for the Celtic tribe of Roman Britain, the Dumnonii), in what today is Devon and Cornwall.
