= Titulus (fortification) =

A titulus is a detached segment of rampart, found at the gateways of Roman camps from the middle of the second century BCE. The earliest known example is at Renieblas near Numantia. Examples from the Flavian and Antonine periods are common in Britain. They are interpreted as making it difficult for enemies to rush directly at the gates, but three unusually large examples (at the entrance to the southern Roman camp at the base of Burnswark Hill) may also have been the sites from which ballistas launched the stone missiles that have been found in the fort on Burnswark Hill itself.

The neuter form titulum has also been used.
