= Ricagambeda =

Celtic goddess worshipped in Roman Britain

Ricagambeda was a Celtic goddess worshipped in Roman Britain. She is attested in a single inscription, RIB 2107, on an altar stone found at Birrens (the Roman Blatobulgium) in what is now Dumfries and Galloway, Scotland. According to the inscription, the altar was raised by men from Vella serving with the Second Cohort of Tungrians in fulfillment of a vow to the goddess. Xavier Delamarre has suggested that her name may be related to the Gaulish word *ricā, meaning ‘sillon’ (‘furrow’).
