= Novantae =

Iron Age people

The Novantae were people of the Iron age, as recorded in Ptolemy's Geography (written c. 150AD). The Novantae are thought to have lived in what is now Galloway and Carrick, in southwesternmost Scotland.

While the Novantae are assumed to be Celts, their specific ethnicity and culture have been the subject of debate for centuries. While Bede referred to a people called the Niduarian and suggested these were Picts, the Encyclopædia Britannica (11th ed.) described them as "a tribe of Celtic Gaels called Novantae or Atecott Picts." Scottish author Edward Grant Ries has identified the Novantae (along with other early tribes of southern Scotland) as a Brythonic-speaking culture.

Modern archeological excavations at Rispain Camp, near Whithorn, suggest that a large fortified farmstead was occupied between 100 BC and 200 AD, indicating that the people living in the area at that time were engaged in agriculture.

More recently, the name "Novantae" has been used by a group of Conservative councillors who left the party in protest to the party's opposition to a Galloway National Park.

== Ptolemy ==
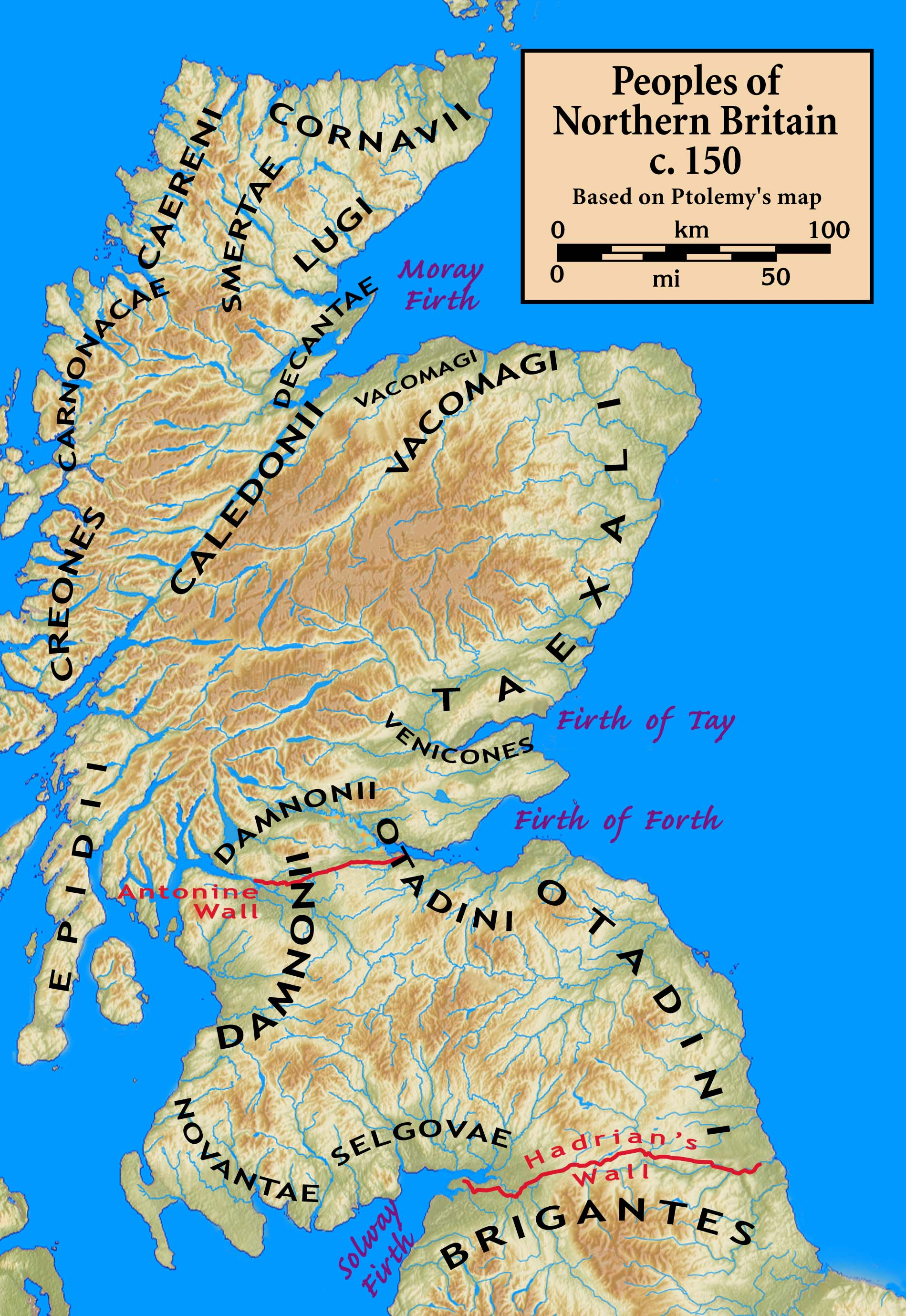
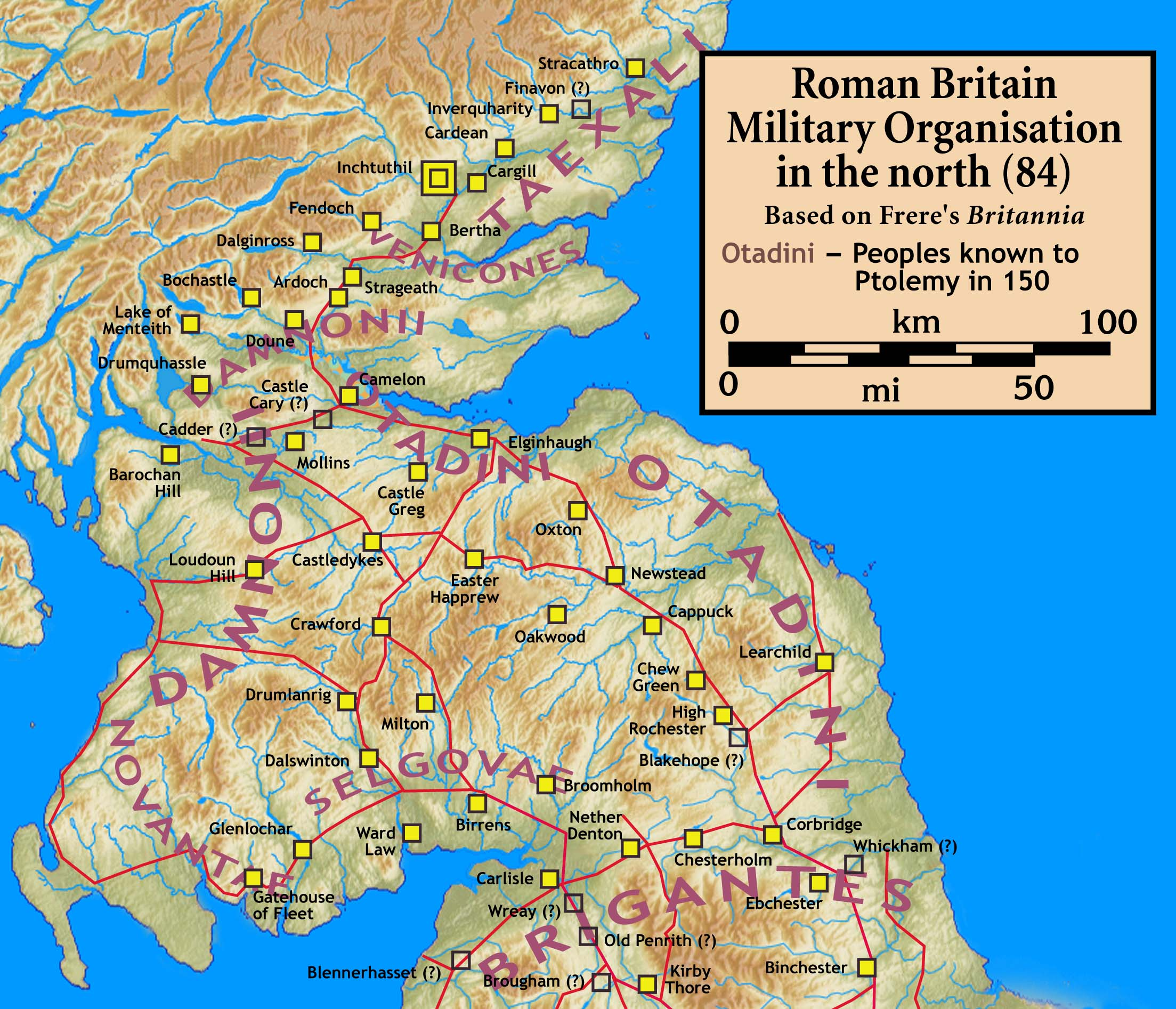

The only historical reference to the Novantae is from the Geography of Ptolemy in c. 150, where he gives their homeland and primary towns. They are found in no other source. Unfortunaley, Ptolemy's Geography is full of errors, as he misunderstood many of the informations, he used for constructing it.

Ptolemy's geography of Scotland is erraneous, as he noted "Clota Estuary", by name the Firth of Clyde, explicitly as a bay of the northern coast, east of Novantarum Cheronesus. This way, he created a hybrid of the Firth of Clyde and the inner section of Moray Firth. The easternmost point of his Scotland (31°20' E, 60°15' E) is east of the meridian of the mouth of "Albis potamos", river Elbe (31° E, 56°15' N). The Orcades, Orkney Islands, are north of this eastern point, and between it and the northern end of Cimbrian chersones, Jutland, he placed the "three Saxon islands". Segontium (Σεγαντίων λίμην, Segantiorum limēn), in reality on the south of Menai Strait, was placed by Ptolemy between "Ituna estuary" (18°30' E, 58°55' N, Solway Firth) and "Moricambē estuary" (17°30' E, 58°20' N, Morecambe Bay) in the north, two other estuaries and the town of "Deva of the 20th Legion" (Chester), in the south; so he placed it somewhere near Blackpool.

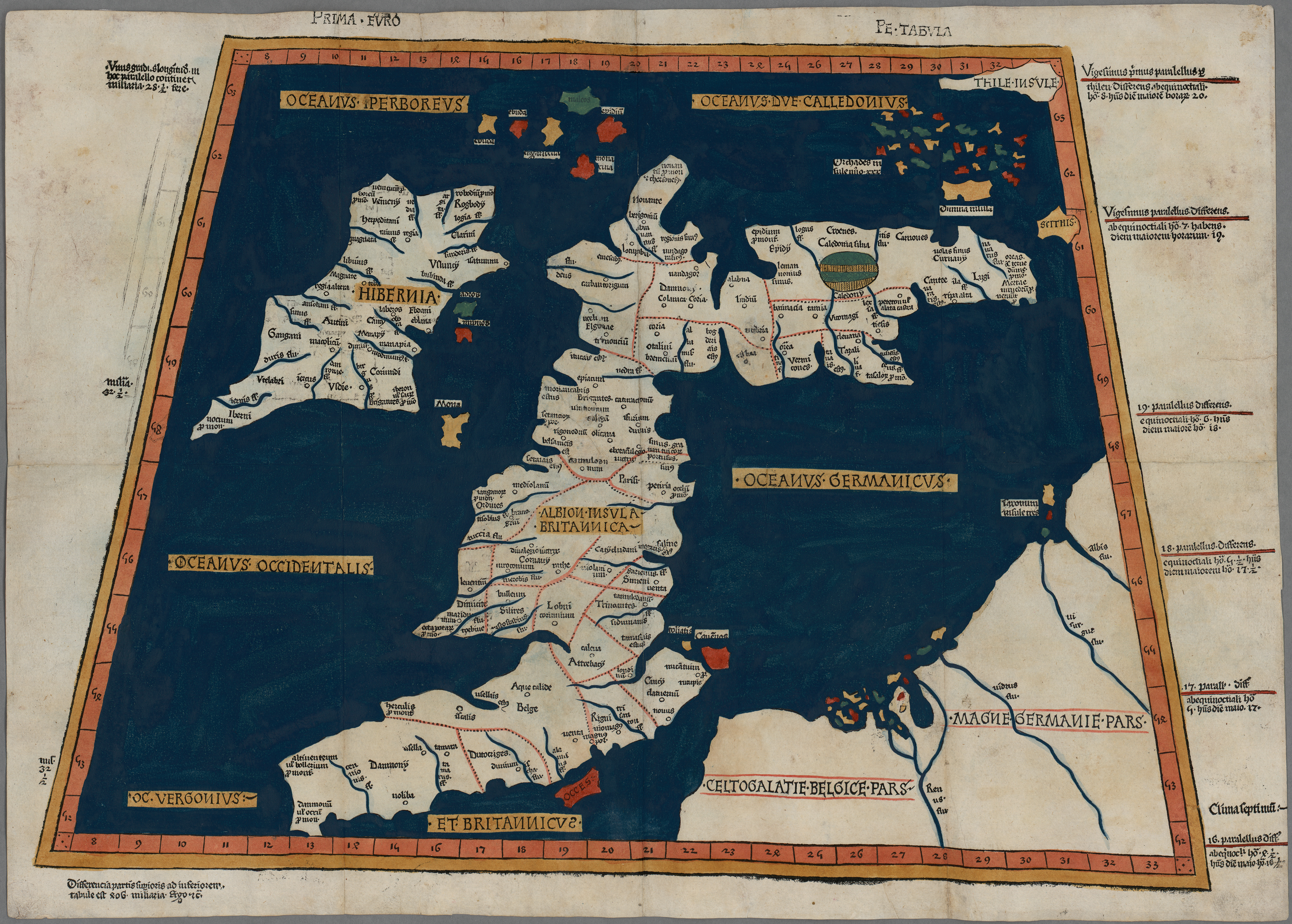
Ptolemy's British Islands, Scotland turned east by 90°, on top the "novantum prnoun & chersones" (drawn and printed in 1482 in Ulm)

Novantarum promontory (21° E, 61°40' N, that is 1°30' E, 2°45'N north of Ituna estuary) is his northernmost point of the Albion Island in almost correct difference of latitude of Dunnet Head to the delta of River Rhone. Nevertheless it may represent the Rhins of Galloway, as Ptolemy turned Scotland by 90°, clockwise. In his geography, the Νοουάνται (Novantae) were the northernmost tribe of Albion Island, the Σελγοοῦαι (Selgovae) lived south of them, and east of those he placed the Δαμνόνιοι (Damnonii).

Ptolemy says that the towns of the Novantae were Locopibium and Rerigonium. As there were no towns as such in the area at that time, he was likely referring to native strong points such as duns or royal courts.

== Roman era ==
The earliest reliable information on the region of Galloway and Carrick when it was inhabited by the Novantae comes from archaeological discoveries. They lived in small enclosed settlements, most of them less than a single hectare in area and inhabited from the 1st millennium BC through to the Roman era. They also constructed hillforts and a small number of crannogs and brochs. Stone-walled huts appeared during the Roman era and the Novantae are thought to have had a centre of some kind at Clatteringshaws near Kirkcudbright, which started out as a palisaded enclosure before being expanded into a set of timber and then stone-faced ramparts. This had been abandoned by the Roman period but there is evidence that the Romans used it as the target of a military exercise, erecting two practice camps nearby and subjecting it to a mock siege.

The only Roman military presence was a small fortlet at Gatehouse of Fleet, in the southeastern part of Novantae territory. The Roman remains that have been excavated are portable, such as might be carried or transported into the region. The absence of evidence of Roman presence is in sharp contrast to the many remains of native habitation and strong points. Rispain Camp near Whithorn, once thought to be Roman, is now known to be the remains of a large fortified farmstead, occupied by natives before and during the Roman Era.

In his account of the campaigns of Gnaeus Julius Agricola (governor 78 – 84), Tacitus offers no specific information on the peoples then living in Scotland. He says that after a combination of force and diplomacy quieted discontent among the Britons who had been conquered previously, Agricola built forts in their territories in 79. In 80 he marched to the Firth of Tay, campaigning against the peoples there. He did not return until 81, at which time he consolidated his gains in the lands that he had conquered. The Novantae were later said to have caused trouble along Hadrian's Wall, and the Gatehouse of Fleet fortlet was presumably used to subdue them.

== Novant ==
The Novantae disappear from the historical record after the end of the Roman occupation, as the name was beyond doubt the Roman name for the people who did not use it, with their territory supplanted by the kingdoms of Rheged and Gododdin. A kingdom called Novant appears in the medieval Welsh poem Y Gododdin, attributed to Aneirin. The poem commemorates the Battle of Catraeth, in which an army raised by Gododdin attempted an ill-fated raid on the Angles of Bernicia. The work elegises the various warriors who fought alongside the Gododdin, among them the "Three Chiefs of Novant" and their substantial retinue. This Novant is evidently related to the Novantae tribe of the Iron Age.

== Contradicting Ptolemy ==
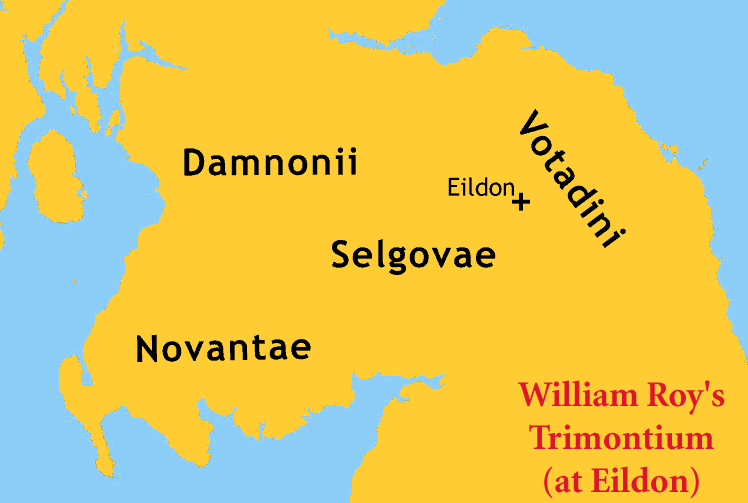
Location of the Selgovae town of Trimontium according to Roy, who was trying to reconcile problems with the spurious De Situ Britanniae.

Ptolemy's placement of the Selgovae town of Trimontium was accepted to be somewhere along the southern coast of Scotland until William Roy (1726–1790) placed it far to the east at Eildon Hills, near Newstead. Roy was trying to follow an itinerary given in the 1757 De Situ Britanniae, and moving Ptolemy's Trimontium made the itinerary seem more logical according to his historical work, Military Antiquities of the Romans in North Britain (1790, published posthumously in 1793). Roy did not alter Ptolemy's placement of the Selgovae in southern Scotland, but chose to assign Trimontium to a different people who were described in De Situ Britanniae.

When De Situ Britanniae was debunked as a fraud in 1845, Roy's misguided placement of Trimontium was retained by some historians, though he was no longer cited for his contribution. Furthermore, some historians not only accepted Roy's placement of Trimontium, but also returned the town to the Selgovae by moving their territory so that they would be near Eildon Hills. Ptolemy's placement of the Novantae in Galloway was retained, and since Ptolemy said that they were adjacent to the Selgovae, Novantae territory was greatly expanded beyond Galloway to be consistent with this thesis, which survives in a number of modern histories.

The result is that an 'error correction' to the sole legitimate historical reference (Ptolemy), made so that a fictional itinerary in De Situ Britanniae would seem more logical, is retained; and the sole legitimate historical reference is further 'corrected' by moving the Selgovae far from their only known location, greatly expanding Novantae territory in the process.

While Roy's historical work is largely ignored due to his unknowing reliance on a fraudulent source, his maps and drawings are untainted, and continue to be held in the highest regard.

== Treatment by historians ==
Befitting the single historical mention of the Novantae by Ptolemy, many historians have largely included the Novantae im passim in their works, if they are mentioned at all. William Forbes Skene (Celtic Scotland, 1886) briefly relates their notice in Ptolemy, adding his conjectures as to the possible locations of towns, though not with any conviction. John Rhys (Celtic Britain, 1904) mentions the Novantae in passing, without any detailed discussion. Local Galwegian historians, writing histories of their own home territory, provide a similarly scant treatment.

More recent histories largely treat the Novantae in passing, but sometimes weave them into a story that is not supported by either Ptolemy's map or archaeological evidence, though they are consistently placed in Galloway. John Koch (Celtic Culture, 2005) doesn't discuss the Novantae directly, but associates their name with the Trinovantes of southeastern England, and provides a map showing the "Novant" occupying Galloway including Kirkcudbrightshire to accompany his discussion of the Gododdin. Barry Cunliffe, an archaeologist, (Iron Age Communities in Britain, 1971) mentions the Novantae in passing, saying their homeland was Galloway, and with a map showing it, which he attributes to "various sources". David Mattingly (An Imperial Possession: Britain in the Roman Empire, 2006) mentions them as a people of southwestern Scotland according to Ptolemy, with maps showing them as occupying ditto Galloway. Sheppard Frere (Britannia: A History of Roman Britain, 1987) mentions the Novantae several times in passing, associating them firmly with the Selgovae and sometimes with the Brigantes. He places them in Galloway, with the Selgovae on the other side of the Southern Uplands in southeastern Scotland. The Novantae is inconsequential to the larger history of Scotland in Before Scotland: The Story of Scotland Before History (2005) by Alistair Moffat, but he weaves a number of colourful though questionable details about them into his story. He says that their name means 'the Vigorous People', that they had kings and often acted in concert with the Selgovae and Brigantes, all of whom may have joined the Picts in raids on Roman Britain. He provides no authority for any of these assertions.

== See also ==
- Ptolemy's Geography
- Britannia (Roman province)
- Scotland during the Roman Empire
