= Argentocoxos =

Caledonian chief

Argentocoxos was a Caledonian chief in the early 3rd century. He is known from the Historia Romana of Cassius Dio, who gives an account of the campaigns of Septimius Severus in that region. His name means "silver leg" and is evidence that the Picts spoke a Celtic language.

After treaty negotiations in the year 210, his wife spoke with the Empress, Julia Augusta, about Caledonian and Roman society. Dio presents the account with a traditional topos, contrasting the vigorous virtue of barbarian life with Roman decadence

...a very witty remark is reported to have been made by the wife of Argentocoxus, a Caledonian, to Julia Augusta. When the empress was jesting with her, after the treaty, about the free intercourse of her sex with men in Britain, she replied: "We fulfil the demands of nature in a much better way than do you Roman women; for we consort openly with the best men, whereas you let yourselves be debauched in secret by the vilest."
