= Rispain Camp =

Coordinates: 54°43′47.23″N 4°26′26.08″W

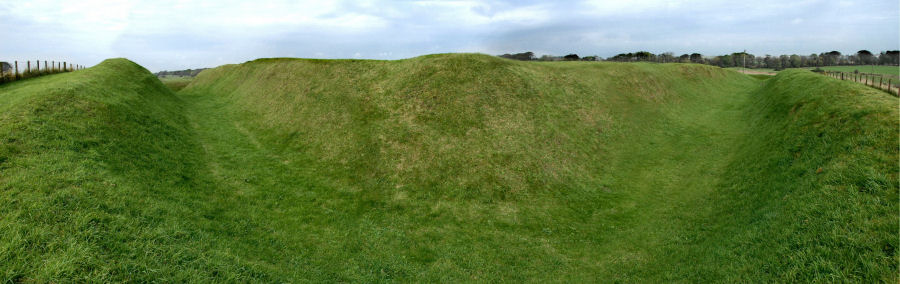
Rispain Camp from the south

Rispain Camp is the remains of a fortified farmstead 1 mile west of Whithorn, Dumfries and Galloway, Scotland. It is one of the major Iron Age archaeological sites in Scotland. The property is in the care of Historic Environment Scotland. Access is through a farm off the A746 South of Whithorn.

The name Rispain may derive from a local equivalent of the Old Welsh word rhwospen meaning 'the chief of the cultivated country', a name certainly appropriate to as prestigious a farm as this.

Today it consists of two broad earth banks separated by a ditch, originally almost six metres deep surrounding an enclosure of almost half a hectare. Its defences are so well preserved that until the mid-1970s archaeologists believed the site to be either a Roman fort or mediaeval farmstead. However excavations in the early 1980s provided evidence that it was inhabited between the 100 BC and 200 AD by local Celtic farmers. Radiocarbon dating has provided evidence that the site was definitely occupied around 60 BC.

Excavation revealed traces of a timber gateway to the north east, which would probably have been connected to a timber stockade running along the top of the inner rampart. There was also evidence of large timber roundhouses inside the enclosure, one of which is thirteen and a half metres in diameter. In the ditch's south eastern corner excavation uncovered a square pit, possibly a cistern. Cattle, sheep and pigs were kept and hunting in the surrounding countryside provided venison. Barley and wheat may not just have been used as foodstuffs but also, in the case of barley, used in the brewing of alcohol.
