= Blatobulgium =

Roman fort in Scotland

Coordinates: 55.0651°N 3.2244°W

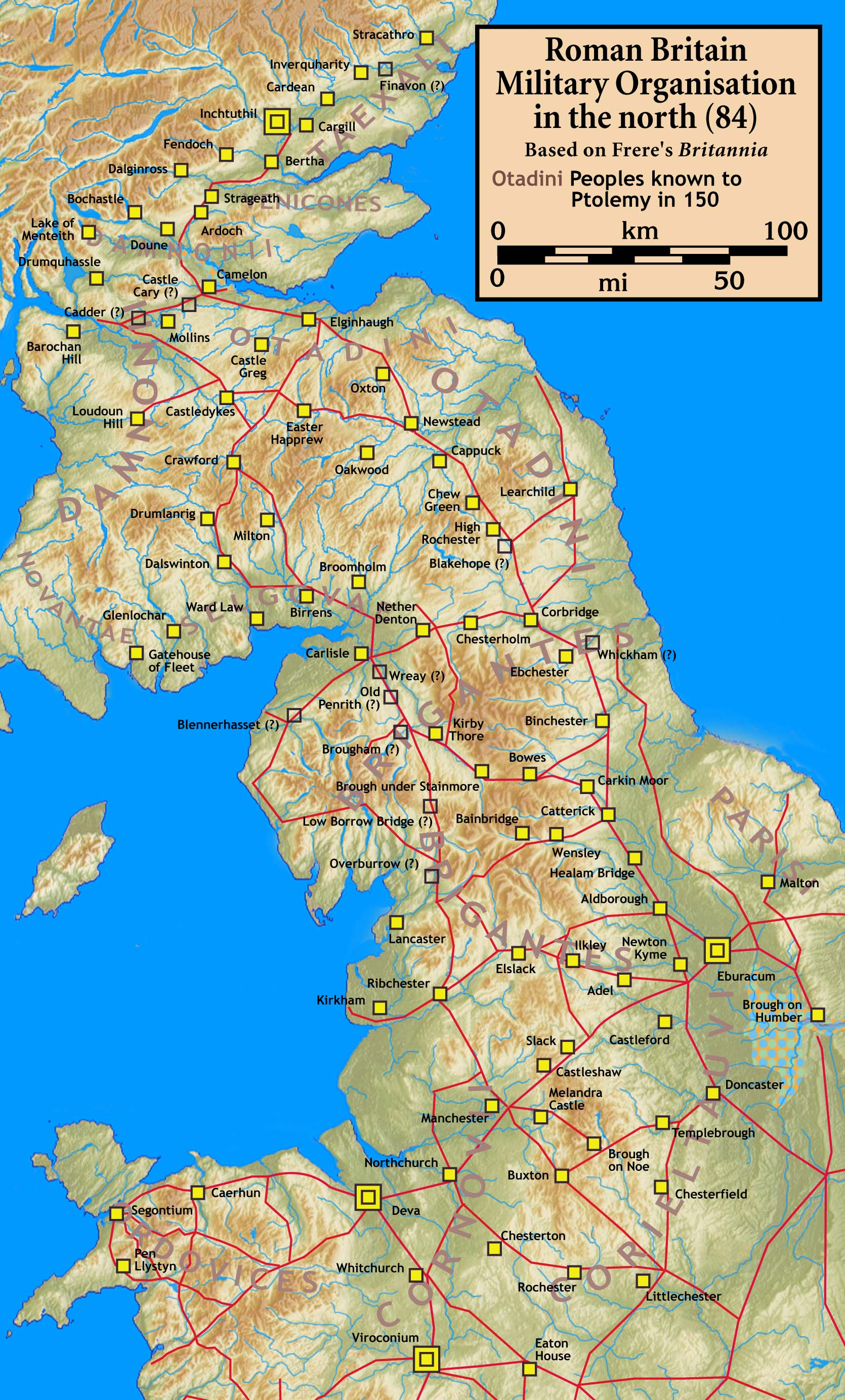
A map of Roman sites in northern Britain c. 84, including Blatobulgium (marked as 'Birrens').

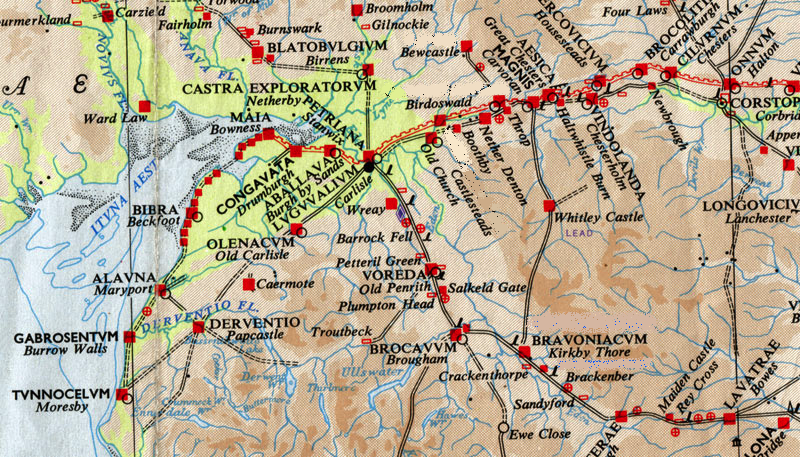
Roman forts and roads in the north of England around AD 130

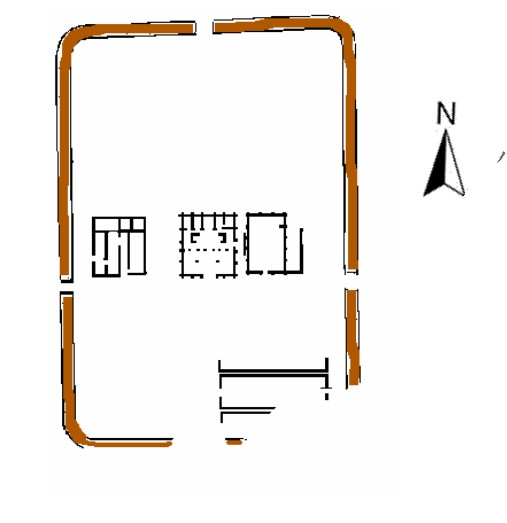
Plan of Blatobulgium

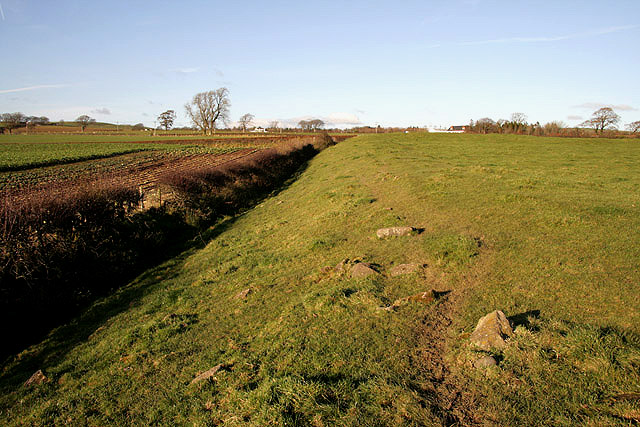
Western edge of the fort

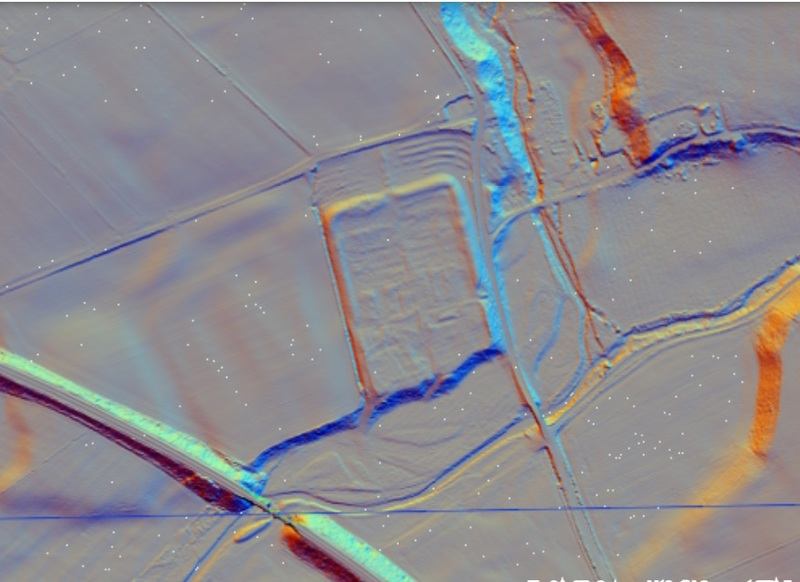
Birrens Lidar image

Blatobulgium was a Roman fort, located at the modern-day site known as Birrens, in Dumfriesshire, Scotland. It protected the main western road to Scotland.

It was one of the "outpost forts" outside the Roman Empire when the frontier was on Hadrian's Wall and was located about 11 miles from the Castra Exploratorum fort (Netherby, Cumbria).

== Name ==
Blatobulgium is recorded in the Antonine Itinerary. The name derives from the Brittonic roots *blāto- 'bloom, blossom' or *blāto- (from earlier *mlāto-), 'flour' and *bolgo-, 'bag, bulge'. The name may mean 'flowery hillock' or 'flowery hollow'. However, as there are granaries at the fort, Blatobulgium may be a nickname meaning 'Flour Sacks'.

== History ==
There are several camps near Birrens at least one of which was first occupied in the Flavian period from 79 AD onwards probably during the Agricolan campaigns, when its internal buildings were presumably of timber. Under Hadrian when the frontier was established on Hadrian's Wall soon after 122, a new fort was constructed as an outpost fort on the site of a late 1st century fortlet with central timber buildings and a large western annexe. The visible fort and its internal buildings date from the Antonine period around 142 after the reconquest of the Scottish Lowlands when the earlier fort was rebuilt and enlarged to protect the western road to the Antonine Wall and to accommodate a nominally 1,000-strong milliaria equitata garrison of the 1st Cohort Nerviana Germanorum, a mixed unit of cavalry and infantry of the auxiliary army. It was destroyed perhaps by enemy action around 155 and the replacement stone buildings, although of much poorer quality, in the second Antonine period dating to 159 onwards were for the new garrison of the 2nd Cohort of Tungrians, likewise milliaria equitata. From about 163 it was again an outpost of Hadrian's Wall and was finally abandoned by about 184.

The later fort formed the northern terminus of the Roman-era Watling Street (using an extended definition of this road), or more simply Route 2 of the Antonine Itinerary. It was located in the territory of the Selgovae.

== Finds ==
There have been more inscribed and sculptured stones found at Birrens than anywhere else in Scotland. An altar stone dedicated to the Celtic goddess Ricagambeda was found at Birrens. A stone statue and alter dedicated to the goddess Brigantia was also found.
