= Selgovae =

Celtic tribe

The Selgovae (Common Brittonic: *Selgowī) were a Celtic tribe of the late 2nd century AD who lived in what is now Kirkcudbrightshire and Dumfriesshire, on the southern coast of Scotland. They are mentioned briefly in Ptolemy's Geography, and there is no other historical record of them. Their cultural and ethnic affinity is commonly assumed to have been Brittonic.

Assertions that the Solway Firth preserves the name of the Selgovae are without foundation. 'Solway' is Anglo-Saxon from the thirteenth century (sol = 'mud', wæth = 'ford'), and this was the name of the main crossing at Eskmouth at that time. The firth has been known by various names in the past, and this one happened to be the survivor.

== The historical record ==
=== Ptolemy ===
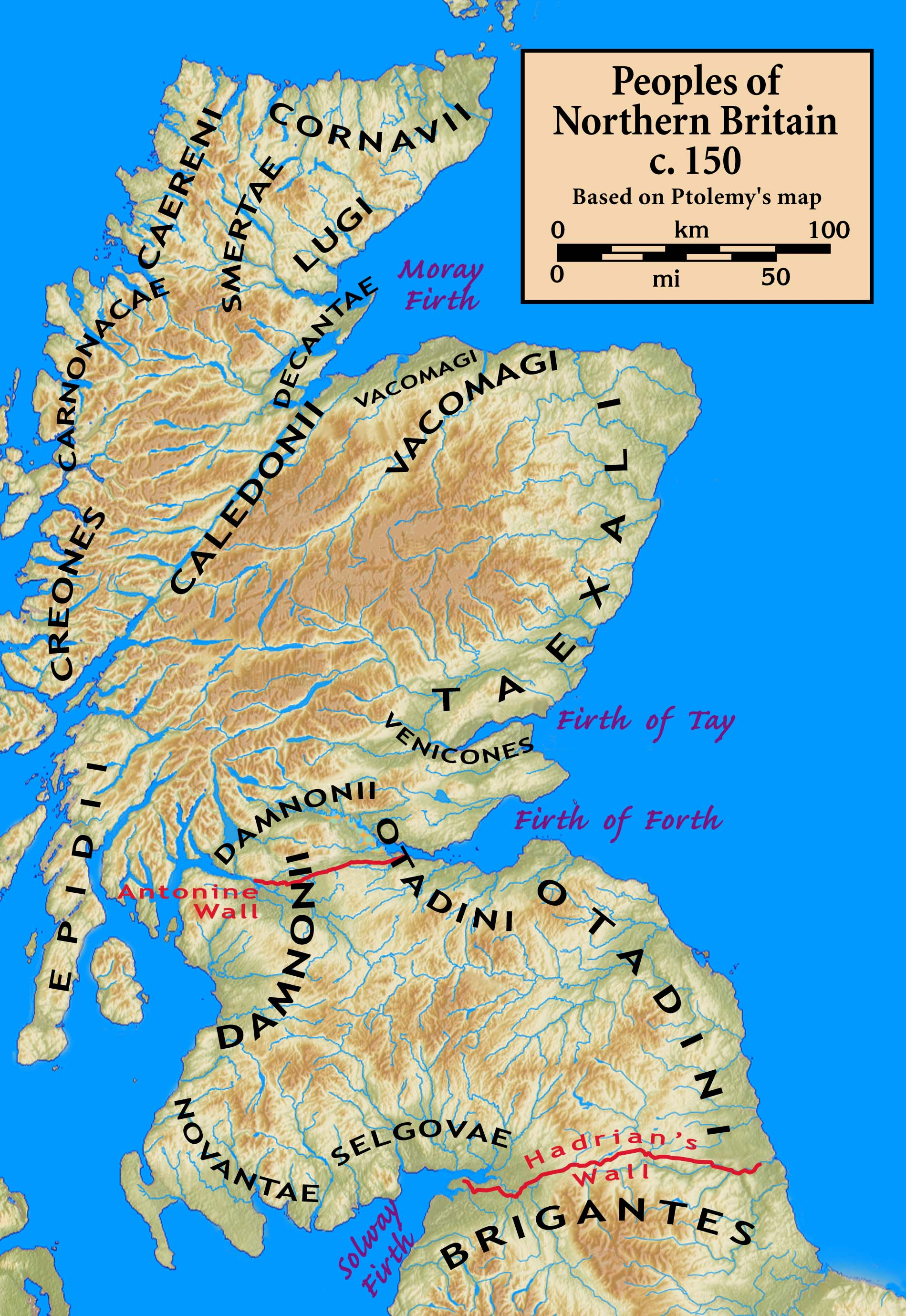

The sole record of the Selgovae and their towns is their mention by Ptolemy in c. AD 150. Their name appears in the 8th century Ravenna Cosmography as 'Segloes', but the document here is taken to be an imperfect copy of classical sources such as Ptolemy, and not an independent historical reference.

The Novantae are unique among the peoples that Ptolemy names in that their location is reliably known to have been in Galloway due to the way he named several readily identifiable physical features. Since the Selgovae were adjacent to them, their homeland is similarly known.

Ptolemy said that the towns of the Selgovae were Carbantorigum, Uxellum, Corda, and Trimontium. However, there were no towns as such in the area at that time, so he was probably referring to Roman military camps and native strong points such as duns. In the Ravenna Cosmography the town names appear as Carbantium, Uxela, Corda, and Trimuntium, respectively, and the towns are given in a list that does not associate any of the towns with any particular people.

Efforts have been made to determine the locations of the towns, but there is not enough information available to reach any degree of certainty, and the locations suggested are little more than guesswork. In the 19th century, Carbantorigum was thought to be the Motte of Urr by Skene, and Rhys thought the name derived from Carbantorion (chariot town). Uxellum was at Wardlaw Hill at Caerlaverock according to Skene and Horsley; it was noted that the name sounds like Welsh uchel (high) or Gaelic uas, uasal. Corda was at Sanquhar, according to Skene. Trimontium was at Birrenswark Hill, according to Skene, who says its name probably represents Welsh Tref mynydd (Town on a Mountain).

Rhys, agreeing with Wyntoun, thought that 'Selgovae' means 'the hunters' (Old Irish: selg, modern Irish: sealg; Old Welsh: selg, modern Welsh: hela 'hunting').

=== Roman Era ===
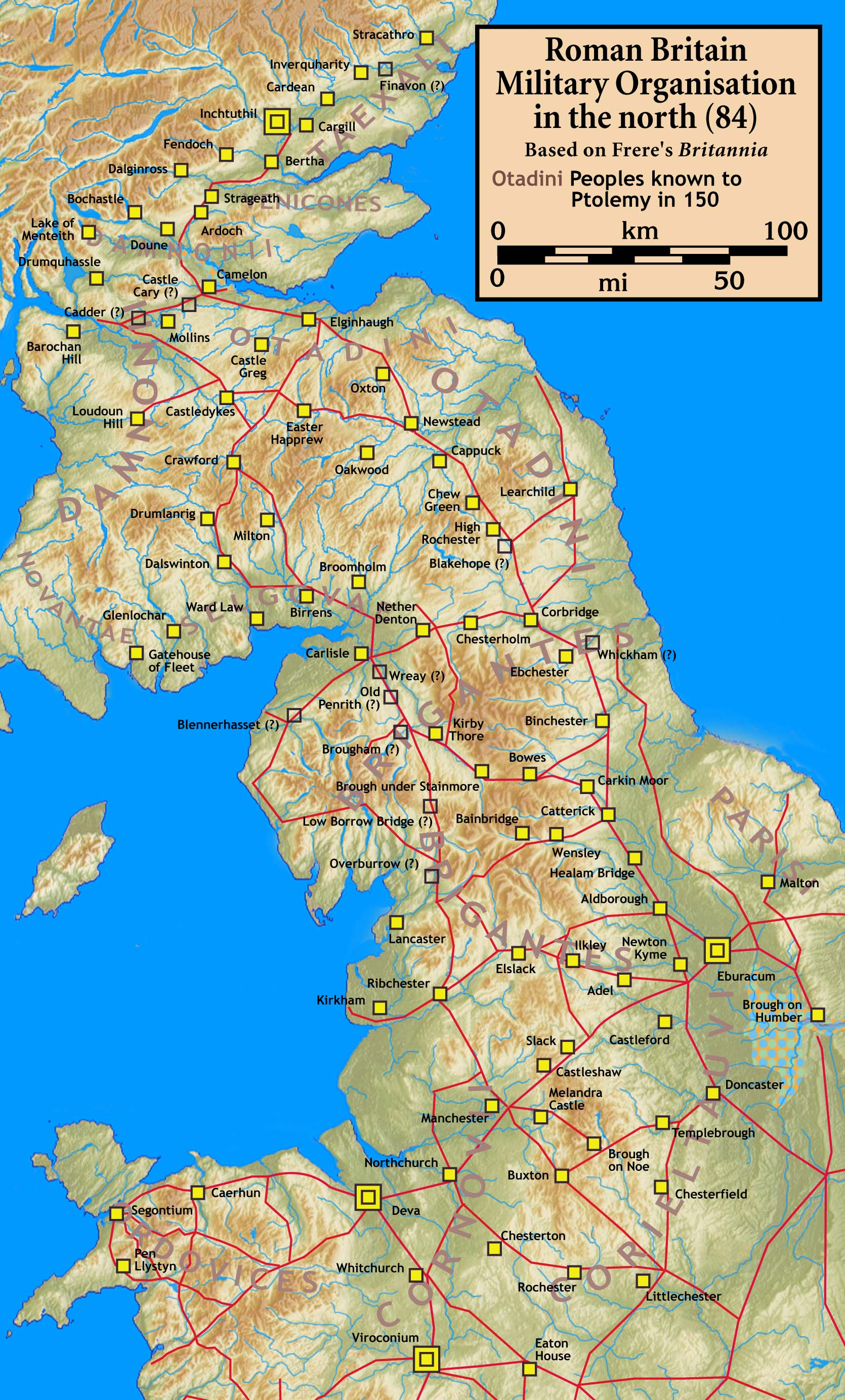

Archaeological evidence indicates that the Selgovae lived in two principal settlement types: stone-built huts and so-called "scooped enclosures", some of which were abandoned in the 1st century AD while others were established in the 2nd century and developed into multivallate structures. They had possibly lived in the area since the Bronze Age, and certainly during the pre-Roman Iron Age. The pattern of forts subsequently established in the area by the Romans suggests that the Selgovae lived in a number of distinct communities and probably had some degree of tribal and political organisation, perhaps influenced by individuals who had fled the Roman advance further south. They are thought to have had a tribal centre at Eildon Hill North near Melrose. They built a significant number of hillforts, more so than their neighbours, which may explain why the Romans targeted them before the relatively less organised and therefore less threatening tribes to the west and north.

In his account of the campaigns of Gnaeus Julius Agricola (governor 78–84), Tacitus says that after a combination of force and diplomacy quieted discontent among the Britons who had been conquered previously, Agricola built forts in their territories in 79. In 80 he marched to the Firth of Tay, campaigning against the peoples there. He did not return until 81, at which time he consolidated his gains in the lands that he had conquered.

The territory of the Selgovae was substantially planted with Roman forts at this time, at Broomholm, Blatobulgium (Birrens), Ward Law, Milton, Drumlanrig, Dalswinton, and Glenlochar on the eastern bank of the River Dee, which was perhaps the boundary between the Selgovae and the neighbouring Novantae. This suggests (but does not confirm) that the Selgovae were among the British peoples who had strongly resisted Roman occupation. This is in contrast to the neighbouring Novantae, where there are no signs of Roman occupation save the fortlet at Gatehouse of Fleet, in the southeast of their territory.

Following the reorganisation of northern Roman Britain and the construction of Hadrian's Wall (c. 122), the only Roman forts among the Selgovae were at Birrens and Netherby. However, with the construction of the Antonine Wall and the re-occupation of territory north of Hadrian's Wall (c. 142), the territory of the Selgovae was again heavily planted with Roman forts, at Netherby, Broomholm, Birrens, Burnswark, Raeburnfoot, Shieldhill, Milton, Drumlanrig, Dalswinton, Carzield, Lantonside, and Glenlochar. There were no Roman forts planted in the territory of the neighbouring Novantae.

When Rome largely abandoned its occupation of territory north of Hadrian's Wall under the reorganisation of Marcus Aurelius (c. 175), they nevertheless retained forts at Birrens and Netherby, though there would never again be a large-scale military occupation of the territory of the Selgovae. Rome permanently abandoned the area by 370.

=== Cultural affinity ===
The ethnic and cultural affinity of the Selgovae is assumed to have been Brittonic and there have been suggestions that they were an integral part of the tribe of the Brigantes.

Archaeological evidence is scant, but it includes a Roman-era figure and inscription found at Birrens (the Roman Blatobulgium) that was dedicated to 'Brigantia', similar to dedications found in known Brigantian territory in Cumbria and Yorkshire. Tacitus says that the Brigantes were a large tribe, and artefacts associated with the Brigantes have been found across the region just north of Hadrian's Wall, both in England and in Scottish Dumfriesshire and Kirkcudbrightshire.

The Brigantes were troublesome to Roman rule, strongly resisting initial Roman occupation and frequently rising in efforts to throw off Roman rule. The Roman response was overwhelming force and the subsequent heavy plantation of forts of occupation. The heavy plantation of forts in the territory of the Selgovae is similar to the Roman occupation of the Brigantes and unlike Roman treatment of other neighbouring peoples such as the Novantae and Votadini, who were never known to be at war with the Romans, and who were not heavily occupied.

Much later history, better recorded, shows that the territory of the Selgovae was continually associated with Cumbria (homeland of the Brigantes) and Alt Clud (homeland of the Damnonii), both of which are known to have been Britonnic in culture and language.

== Contradicting Ptolemy ==
Ptolemy's placement of the Selgovaean town of Trimontium was accepted to be somewhere along the southern coast of Scotland until William Roy (1726–1790) placed it far to the east at Eildon Hills, near Newstead. Roy was trying to follow an itinerary given in the 1757 De Situ Britanniae, and moving Ptolemy's Trimontium made the itinerary seem more logical according to his historical work, Military Antiquities of the Romans in North Britain (1790, published posthumously in 1793). Roy did not alter Ptolemy's placement of the Selgovae in southern Scotland, but chose to assign Trimontium to a different people who were described in De Situ Britanniae.

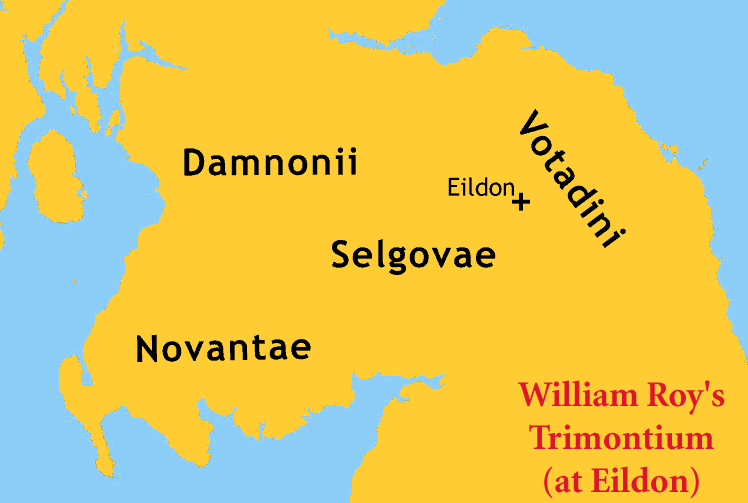
Location of the Selgovae town of Trimontium according to Roy, who was trying to reconcile problems with the spurious De Situ Britanniae.

When De Situ Britanniae was debunked as a fraud in 1845, Roy's misguided placement of Trimontium was retained by some historians, though he was no longer cited for his contribution. Furthermore, some historians not only accepted Roy's placement of Trimontium, but also returned the town to the Selgovae by moving their territory such that they would be near Eildon Hills. Ptolemy's placement of the Novantae in Galloway was retained, and since Ptolemy said that they were adjacent to the Selgovae, Novantae territory was greatly expanded beyond Galloway to be consistent with this thesis, which survives in a number of modern histories.

The result is that an 'error correction' to the sole legitimate historical reference (Ptolemy), made so that a fictional itinerary in De Situ Britanniae would seem more logical, is retained; and the sole legitimate historical reference is further 'corrected' by moving the Selgovae far from their only known location.

While Roy's historical work is largely ignored due to his unknowing reliance on a fraudulent source, his maps and drawings are untainted, and continue to be held in the highest regard. Roy's work is highly supported by the town of Selkirk.

== See also ==
- Ptolemy's Geography
- Roman Britain
- Scotland during the Roman Empire
