= Damnonii =

Brittonic people of the late 2nd century

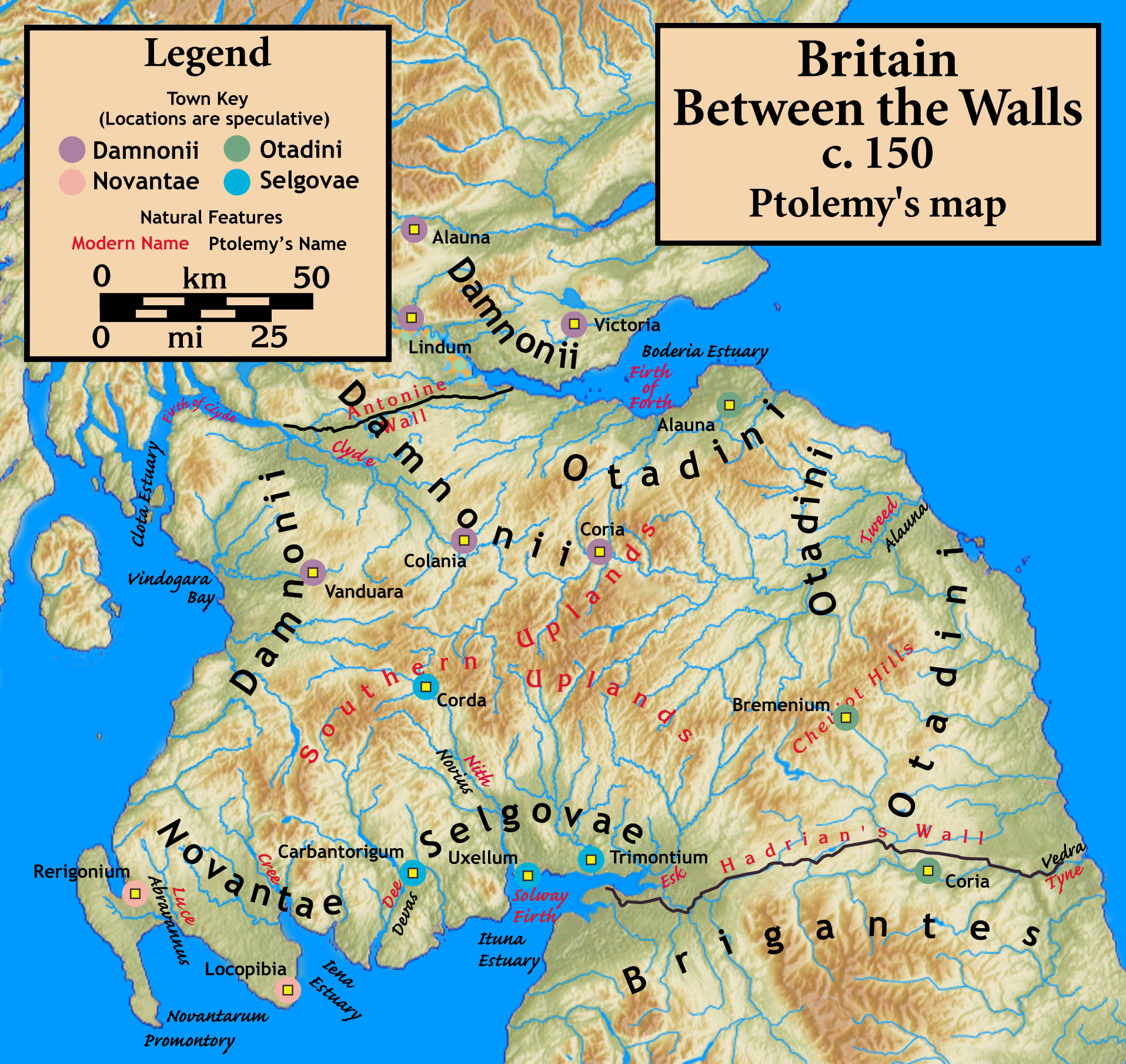
Ptolemy's map of Scotland south of the Forth.

The Damnonii (also referred to as Damnii) were a Brittonic people of the late 2nd century who lived in what became the Kingdom of Strathclyde by the Early Middle Ages, and is now southern Scotland. They are mentioned briefly in Ptolemy's Geography, where he uses both of the terms "Damnonii" and "Damnii" to describe them, and there is no other historical record of them, except arguably by Gildas three centuries later. Their cultural and linguistic affinity is presumed to be Brythonic. However, there is no unbroken historical record, and a partly Pictish origin is not precluded.

The Romans under Agricola had campaigned in the area in 81, and it was Roman-occupied (at least nominally) between the time that Hadrian's Wall was built (c. 122), through the building of the Antonine Wall (c. 142), until the pullback to Hadrian's Wall in 164. Ptolemy's Geography was written within this timeframe, so his account is contemporary.

== Etymology ==
The tribe's name is nearly identical to that of the Dumnonii, a fellow British tribe who lived in Cornwall and Devon. The name is also similar to the Fir Domnann, a tribe who lived in Ireland. So far, no evidence point to the Damnonii, Dumnonii and Domnann being the same people or sharing a unique, common descent, and their similarities are likely to be based on their descriptive etymologies. Both the Dumnonii and the Domnann derive their name from the Celtic root *dumno- which means "the deep" or "inner earth". The Damnonii name could then be taken to mean "the deep ones", or the "deep valley dwellers", probably referring to their homeland being the valley of the Clyde and those of Ayrshire. A less likely theory states that the Damnonii were noted for their mining, which is where they got their names as "the deep ones" as the Clyde area has large amounts of natural ore deposits.

== Historiography ==
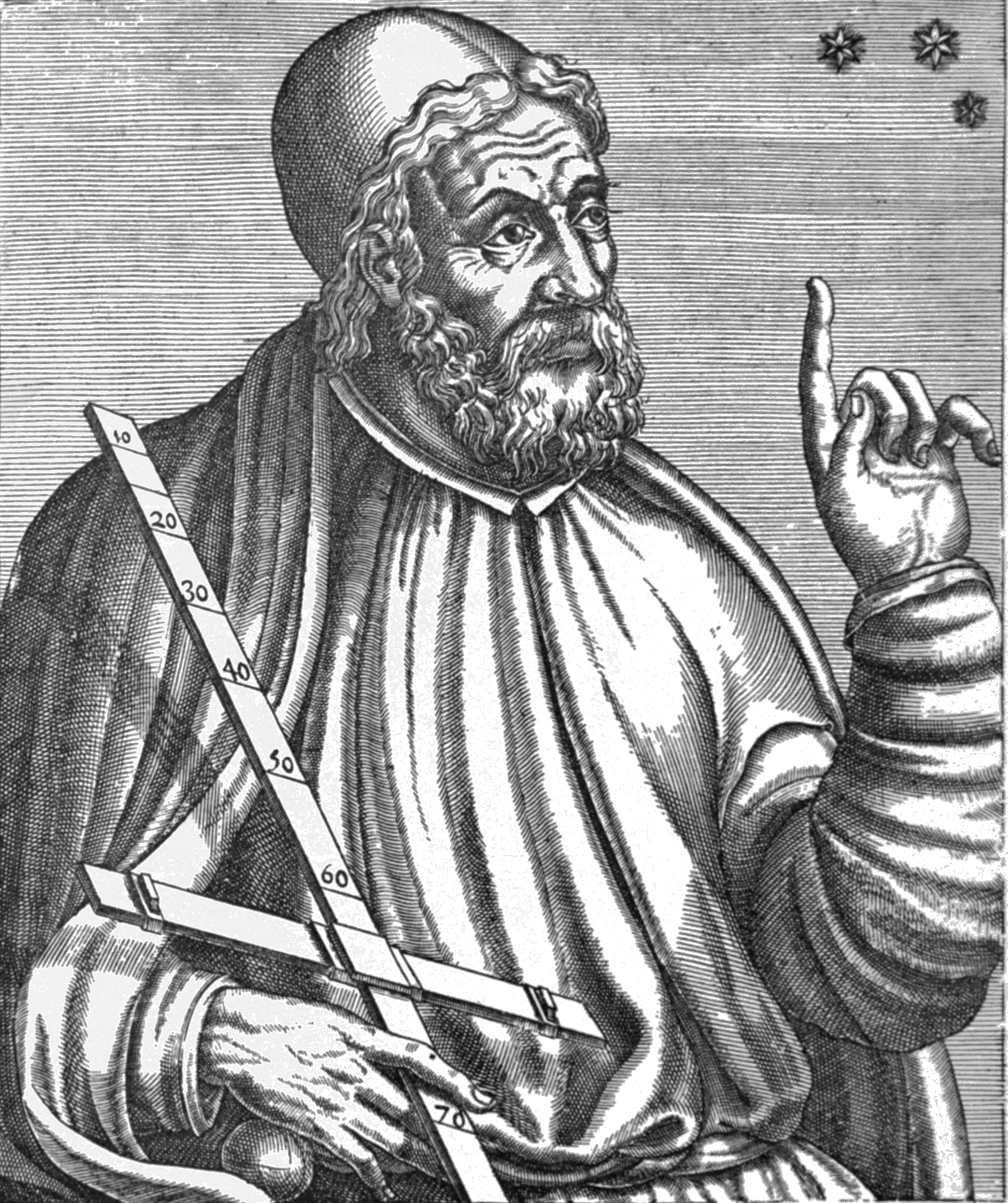
A medieval artist's rendition of Claudius Ptolemaeus.

The sole record of the Damnonii and their towns is their mention by Ptolemy (c. 80 – c. 168). They are found in no other source.

Ptolemy says that the towns of the Damnonii were Vanduara, Colania, Coria, Alauna, Lindum, and Victoria. However, there were no towns as such in the area at that time, so he was likely referring to Roman military camps and native strong points such as duns. Efforts have been made to determine the locations of the towns, but there is not enough information available to reach any degree of certainty, and the locations suggested are little more than guesswork.

Reflecting the lack of evidence, there is little agreement on assigning modern locations to the towns. Among the assignments made by those whose work is considered to be authoritative (to varying degrees) are those of William Baxter (1719, Glossarium Antiquitatum Britannicum), William Camden (1607, Britannia), John Horsley (1732, Britannia Romana), William Forbes Skene (1880, Celtic Scotland, a History of Ancient Alban), George Chalmers (c. 1820, Caledonia), and William Roy (1793, Military Antiquities of the Romans in Britain). Other historians either quote one of these as the authority for assigning locations to Ptolemy's towns, or simply assert a location in passing. A few offer lists of the assertions of the above authorities.

Alauna is suggested to be the Camelon that is near and to the west of Falkirk, or at Stirling, or Kier (about 4 miles (6.4 km) NNW of Stirling, on the Allan Water), or the island of Inchkeith. Colania is suggested to be Lanark or Carstairs (about 5 miles (8.0 km) NE of Lanark), or some other place on the east side of Clydesdale. Coria is suggested to be Lynekirk (about 4 miles (6.4 km) WNW of Peebles, or some other place on the east side of Clydesdale. Lindum is suggested to be Kirkintilloch (about 16 miles (26 km) NE of Glasgow), or Linlithgow, or near Ardoch (the one about 10 miles (16 km) NNW of Stirling). Victoria is suggested to be Dalginross (about 5 miles (8.0 km) W of Crieff, or Abernethy (about 5 miles (8.0 km) SE of Perth). Vanduara is suggested to be Paisley or Renfrew (both about 6 miles (9.7 km) to the west of Glasgow), or some 20 miles south of Glasgow at Loudoun Hill.

From 1757, initial studies of the Damnonii were heavily influenced by the literary forgery The Description of Britain (De Situ Britanniae). The work was considered the only authoritative record of Britannia Inferior, the northern part of Roman Britain. Throughout the latter part of the 18th century until it was debunked as a forgery in 1845, it purportedly contained a lost contemporary account of the province of Britannia from a Roman general, new details about Roman roads in Britain in the style of the Antonine Itinerary, and an improved version of Ptolemy's map. Its credibility was such, that even after it was proven to be fake, it was still cited as a historical source until the end of the 19th century. Even Chalmers and Roy believed in its authenticity at the time they wrote. De Situ Britanniae generally followed Ptolemy's map but made novel assertions regarding Damnonii towns.

== Later history ==
After the final retreat of Rome from Scotland in the year 210 AD, the Damnonii disappear from history, it is unknown when they centralised to form Strathclyde. Letters by Saint Patrick write of the "king of Altclut" (Ceretic Guletic) in the early 400s, with his ancestors being Damnonii leaders with Romanised names, suggesting that there was some degree of Romanisation among the elite Damnonii or renewed contact with the Empire. From this point on the Kingdom of Strathclyde seems to take the place of the Damnonii in history.

== Relations with Rome ==
No evidence, either literary or archaeological points to any battle between the Damnonii and the Romans, suggesting then that the two co-operated. However the large surge in forest cover over Scotland in the 2nd century does point to a drop in the native population, most likely due to disease. Southern Scotland essentially acted as a frontier zone between Britannia Inferior and the Caledonians to the north. However, attacks on Hadrian's Wall later in the 2nd century may show a change in relations between the two. In 364, a people known as the Attacotti despoiled Roman Britain, along with the Irish, Picts and Saxons. It is possible the Damnonii were a part of this mysterious people.

== See also ==
- Ptolemy's Geography
- Scotland during the Roman Empire
- Roman Britain
- Novantae
- Otalini
- Selgovae
- Walls Loch
