= Scotland during the Roman Empire =

Aspect of Scottish history

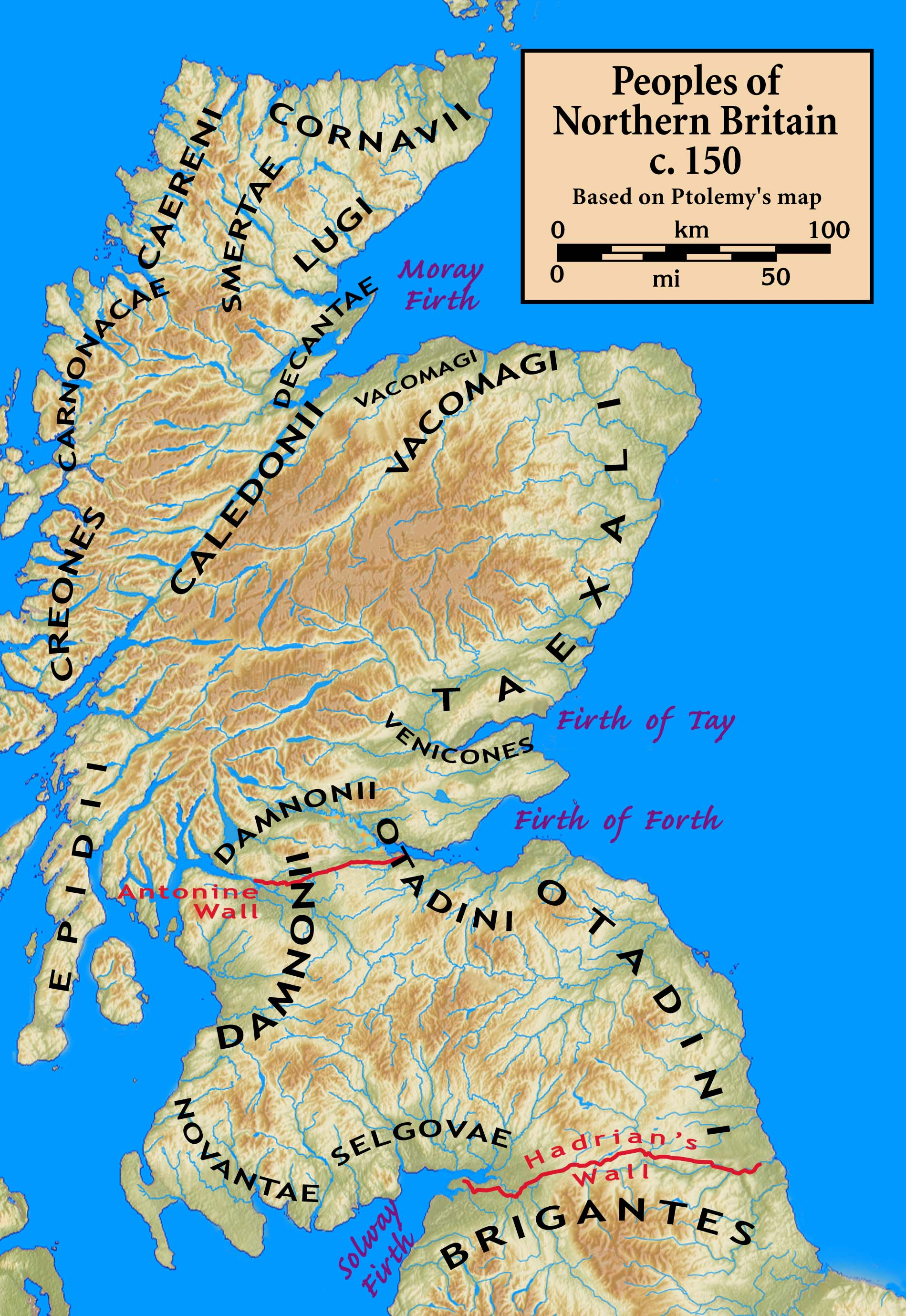
Map of the populations in northern Britain, based on the testimony of Ptolemy.

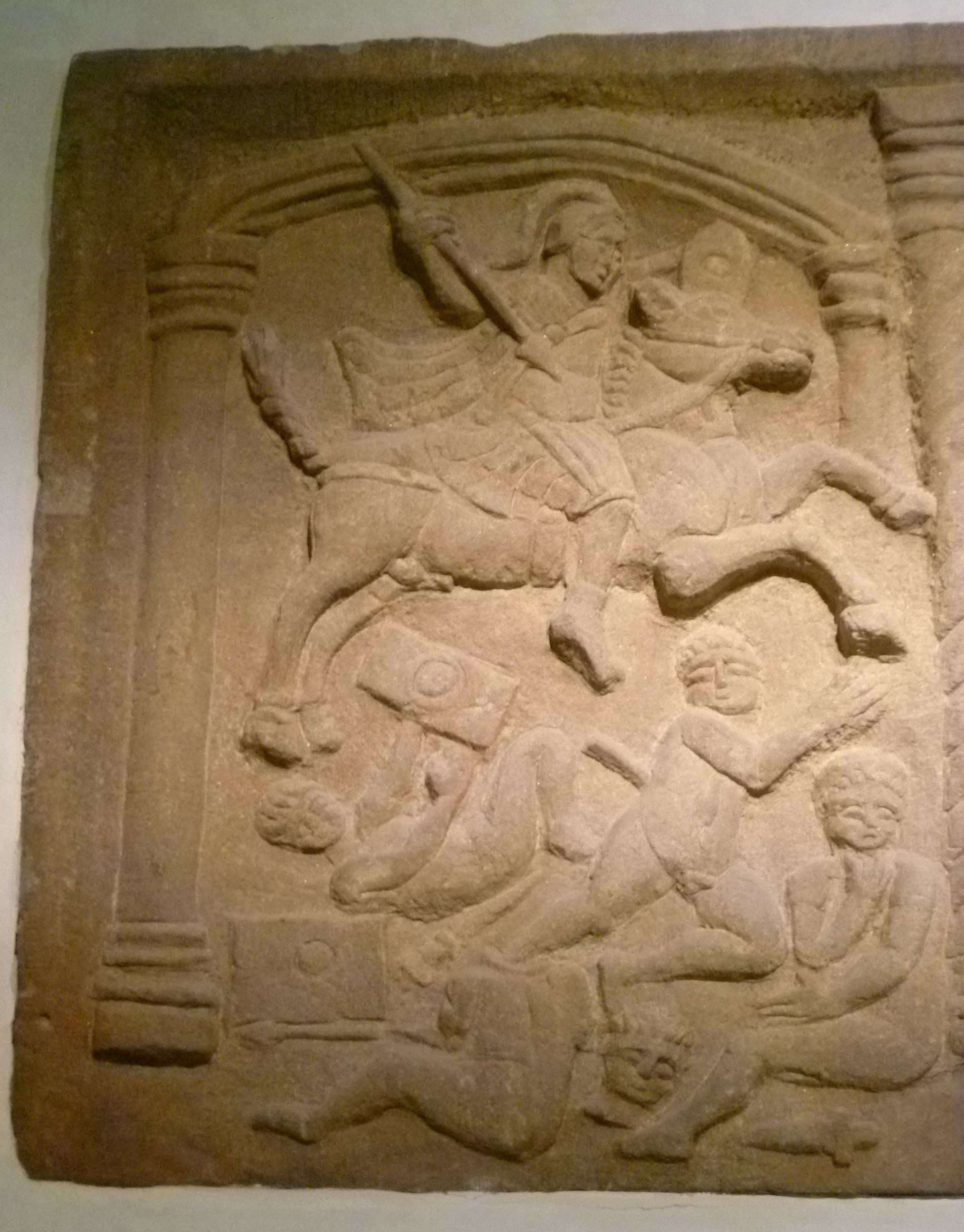
Roman cavalryman trampling conquered Picts, on the Bridgeness Slab, a tablet found at Bo'ness on the Antonine Wall, dated to around AD 142 and now in the National Museum of Scotland in Edinburgh

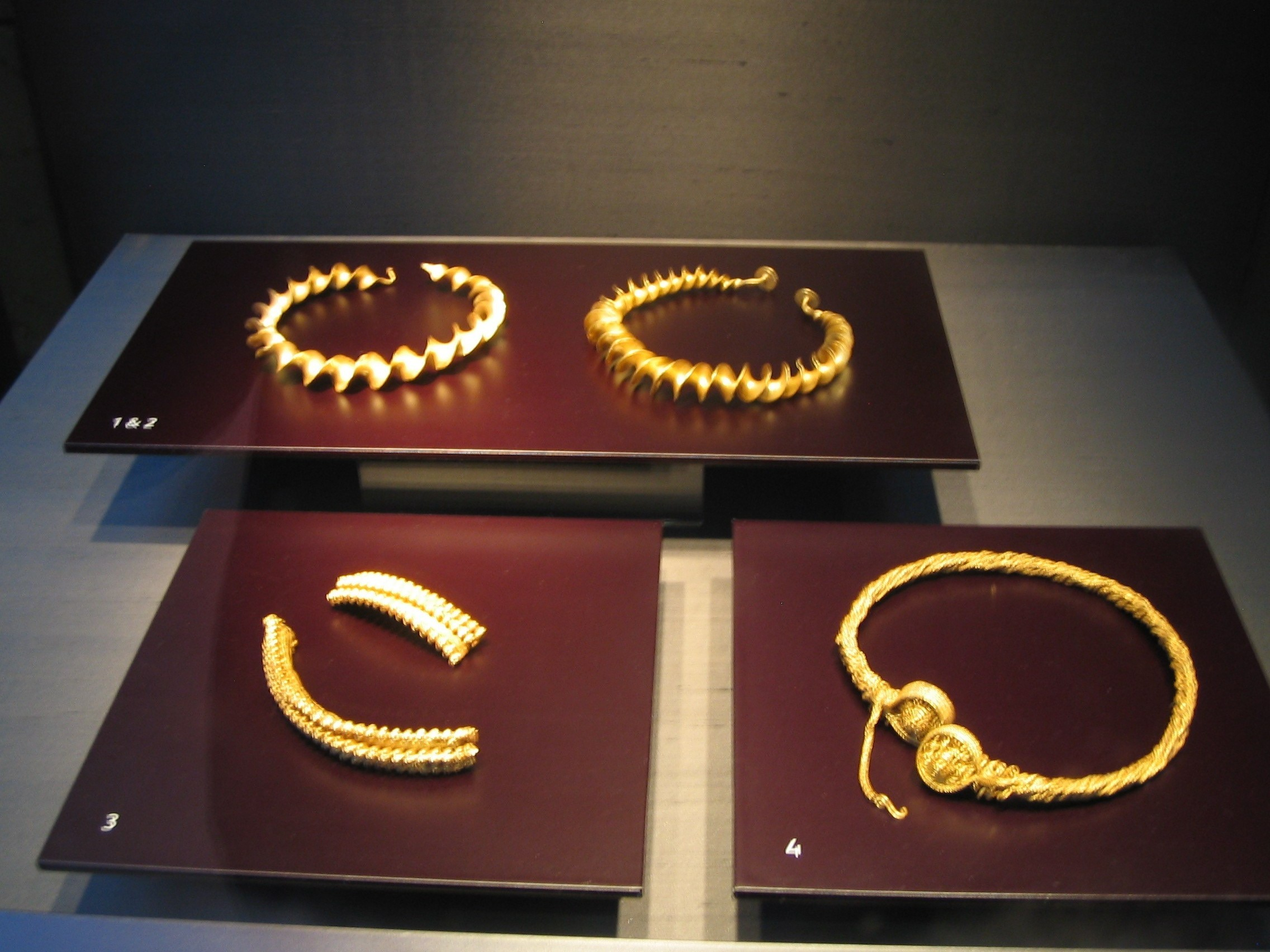
The Stirling torcs: a hoard of gold Celtic torcs

Scotland during the Roman Empire refers to the protohistorical period during which the Roman Empire interacted within the area of modern Scotland. Despite sporadic attempts at conquest and government between the first and fourth centuries AD, most of modern Scotland, inhabited by the Caledonians and the Maeatae, was not incorporated into the Roman Empire with Roman control over the area fluctuating.

In the Roman imperial period, the area of Caledonia lay north of the River Forth, while the area now called England was known as Britannia, the name also given to the Roman province roughly consisting of modern England and Wales and which replaced the earlier Ancient Greek designation as Albion. Roman legions arrived in the territory of modern Scotland around AD 71, having conquered the Celtic Britons of southern Britannia over the preceding three decades. Aiming to complete the Roman conquest of Britannia, the Roman armies under Quintus Petillius Cerialis and Gnaeus Julius Agricola campaigned against the Caledonians in the 70s and 80s. The Agricola, a biography of the Roman governor of Britannia by his son-in-law Tacitus mentions a Roman victory at "Mons Graupius" which became the namesake of the Grampian Mountains but whose identity has been questioned by modern scholarship. In 2023 a lost Roman road built by Julius Agricola was rediscovered in Drip close to Stirling: it has been described as "the most important road in Scottish history".

Agricola then seems to have repeated an earlier Greek circumnavigation of the island by Pytheas and received submission from local tribes, establishing the Roman limes of actual control first along the Gask Ridge, and then withdrawing south of a line from the Solway Firth to the River Tyne, i.e. along the Stanegate. This border was later fortified as Hadrian's Wall. Several Roman commanders attempted to fully conquer lands north of this line, including a second-century expansion that was fortified as the Antonine Wall.

The history of the period is complex and not well-documented. The province of Valentia, for instance, may have been the lands between the two Roman walls, or the territory around and south of Hadrian's Wall, or Roman Wales. Romans held most of their Caledonian territory only a little over 40 years; they probably only held land in present-day Scotland for about 80 years. Some Scottish historians such as Alistair Moffat maintain Roman influence was inconsequential. (Note: "The Romans left us nothing of any enduring cultural value. Their presence in Scotland was brief, intermittent, and not influential on the course of our history.") Despite grandiose claims made by an eighteenth-century forged manuscript, it is now believed that the Romans at no point controlled even half of present-day Scotland and that Roman legions ceased to affect the area after around 211.

"Scots" and "Scotland" proper would not emerge as unified ideas until the eighth century. In fact, the Roman Empire influenced every part of Scotland during the period: by the time of the End of Roman rule in Britannia around 410, the various Iron Age tribes native to the area had united as, or fallen under the control of, the Picts, while the southern half of the country was overrun by tribes of Romanized Britons. The Scoti (Gaelic Irish raiders who would give Scotland its Anglicised name) had begun to settle along the west coast. All three groups may have been involved in the Great Conspiracy that overran Roman Britannia in 367. The era saw the emergence of the earliest historical accounts of the natives. The most enduring legacies of Rome, however, were Christianity and literacy, both of which arrived indirectly via Irish missionaries.

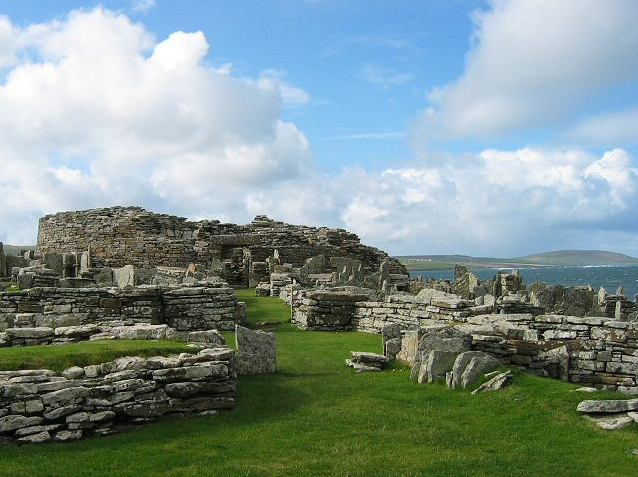
The Broch of Gurness in Orkney

== Iron Age culture in Scotland ==
Ptolemy's tribes located north of the Forth-Clyde isthmus include the Cornovii in Caithness, the Caereni, Smertae, Carnonacae, Decantae, Lugi, and Creones also north of the Great Glen, the Taexali in the north-east, the Epidii in Argyll, the Venicones in Fife, the Caledonians in the central Highlands and the Vacomagi centred near Strathmore. It is likely that all of these cultures spoke a form of Celtic language known as Common Brittonic. The occupants of southern Scotland were the Damnonii in the Clyde valley, the Novantae in Galloway, the Selgovae on the south coast and the Votadini to the east. These peoples may have spoken a form of Brittonic language although no one really knows for sure as there are no written records.

Little is known about this alliance of Iron Age tribes. The exact location of "Caledonia" is unknown, and the boundaries are unlikely to have been fixed. The name itself is a Roman one, as used by Tacitus, Ptolemy, Pliny the Elder and Lucan, but the name by which the Caledonians referred to themselves is unknown. It is likely that prior to the Roman invasions, political control in the region was highly decentralised and no evidence has emerged of any specific Caledonian military or political leadership.

Despite the discovery of many hundreds of Iron Age sites in Scotland, there is still a great deal that remains to be explained about the nature of the Celtic life in the early Christian era. Radiocarbon dating for this period is problematic and chronological sequences are poorly understood. For a variety of reasons, much of the archaeological work to date in Scotland has concentrated on the islands of the west and north and both excavations and analysis of societal structures on the mainland are more limited in scope.

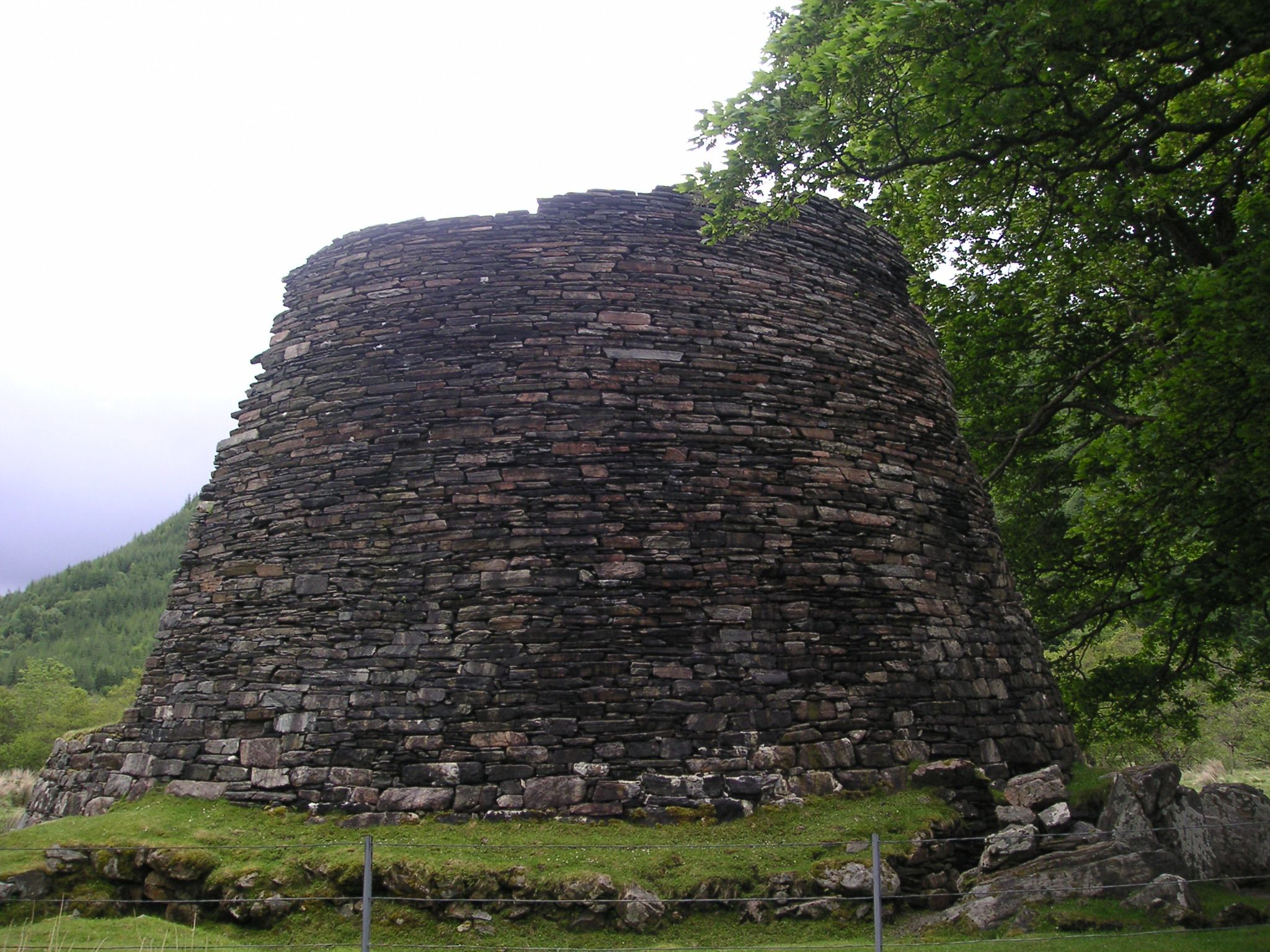
Dun Telve broch in Glenelg

The peoples of early Iron Age Scotland, particularly in the north and west, lived in substantial stone buildings called Atlantic roundhouses. The remains of hundreds of these houses exist throughout the country, some merely piles of rubble, others with impressive towers and outbuildings. They date from about 800 BC to AD 300, with the most imposing structures having been created around the second century BC. The most massive constructions that date from this time are the circular brochs. On average, the ruins only survive up to a few metres above ground level, but there are five extant examples of towers whose walls still exceed 6.5 m (21 ft) in height. There are at least 100 broch sites in Scotland. Despite extensive research, their purpose and the nature of the societies that created them are still a matter of debate.

In some parts of Iron Age Scotland, quite unlike almost all of recorded history right up to the present day, there does not seem to have been a hierarchical elite. Studies have shown that these stone roundhouses, with massively thick walls, must have contained virtually the entire population of islands such as Barra and North Uist. Iron Age settlement patterns in Scotland are not homogeneous, but, in these places, there is no sign of a privileged class living in large castles or forts, nor of an elite priestly caste or of peasants with no access to the kind of accommodation enjoyed by the middle classes.

Over 400 souterrains have been discovered in Scotland, many of them in the south-east, and, although few have been dated, those that have suggest a construction date in the second or third centuries. The purpose of these small underground structures is also obscure. They are usually found close to settlements (whose timber frames are much less well-preserved) and may have been for storing perishable agricultural products.

Scotland also has numerous vitrified forts but an accurate chronology has again proven to be evasive. Extensive studies of such a fort at Finavon Hill near Forfar in Angus, using a variety of techniques, suggest dates for the destruction of the site in either the last two centuries BC or the mid-first millennium. The lack of Roman artefacts (common in local souterrain sites) suggests that many sites were abandoned before the arrival of the legions.

Unlike the earlier Neolithic and Bronze Ages, which have provided massive monuments to the dead, Iron Age burial sites in Scotland are rare, and a 2008 find at Dunbar may provide further insight into the culture of this period. A similar site of a warrior's grave at Alloa has been provisionally dated to AD 90–130.

== Settlements and southern brochs ==
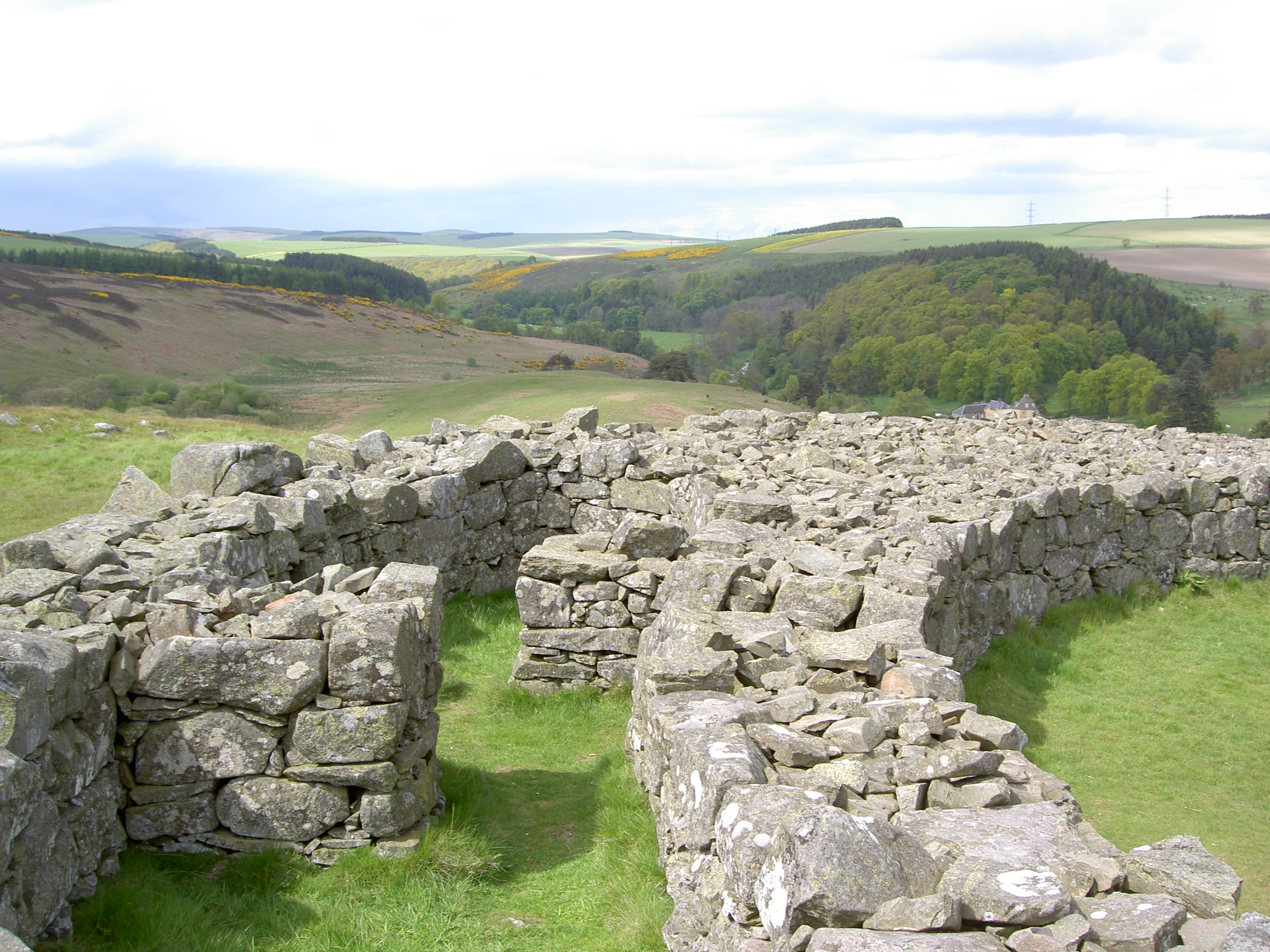
Edin's Hall Broch near Duns in the Scottish Borders, showing intramural chambers

Ptolemy's Geography identifies 19 "towns" from intelligence gathered during the Agricolan campaigns of the first century. No archaeological evidence of any truly urban places has been found from this time and the names may have indicated hill forts or temporary market and meeting places. Most of the names are obscure: Devana may be the modern Banchory; Alauna ("the rock") in the west is probably Dumbarton Rock and the place of the same name in the east Lowlands may be the site of Edinburgh Castle. Lindon may be Balloch on Loch Lomond side.

There are remains of fifteen broch towers in southern Scotland that appear to date from the period immediately prior to or following Agricola's invasion. They are found in four locations: the Forth valley, close to the Firth of Tay, the far south-west and the eastern Borders. Their existence so far from the main centres of broch-building is something of a mystery. The Leckie broch may have been destroyed by the Roman invaders, yet, like the nearby site of Fairy Knowe at Buchlyvie, a substantial amount of both Roman and native artefacts has been recovered there. Both structures were built in the late first century and were evidently high-status buildings. The inhabitants raised sheep, cattle and pigs, and benefited from a range of wild game, including red deer and wild boar.

Edin's Hall Broch in Berwickshire is the best-preserved southern broch and, although the ruins are superficially similar to some of the larger Orcadian broch villages, it is unlikely that the tower was ever more than a single-storey high. There is an absence of Roman artefacts at this site. Various theories for the existence of these structures have been proposed, including their construction by northern invaders following the withdrawal of Roman troops after the Agricolan advance, or by allies of Rome encouraged to emulate the impressive northern style in order to suppress native resistance, perhaps even the Orcadian chiefs whose positive relationship with Rome may have continued from the beginnings of Romano-British relations. It is also possible that their construction had little to do with Roman frontier policy and was simply the importation of a new style by southern elites, or it may have been a response by such elites to the growing threat of Rome prior to the invasion and an attempt to ally themselves, actually or symbolically, with the north that was largely free of Roman hegemony.

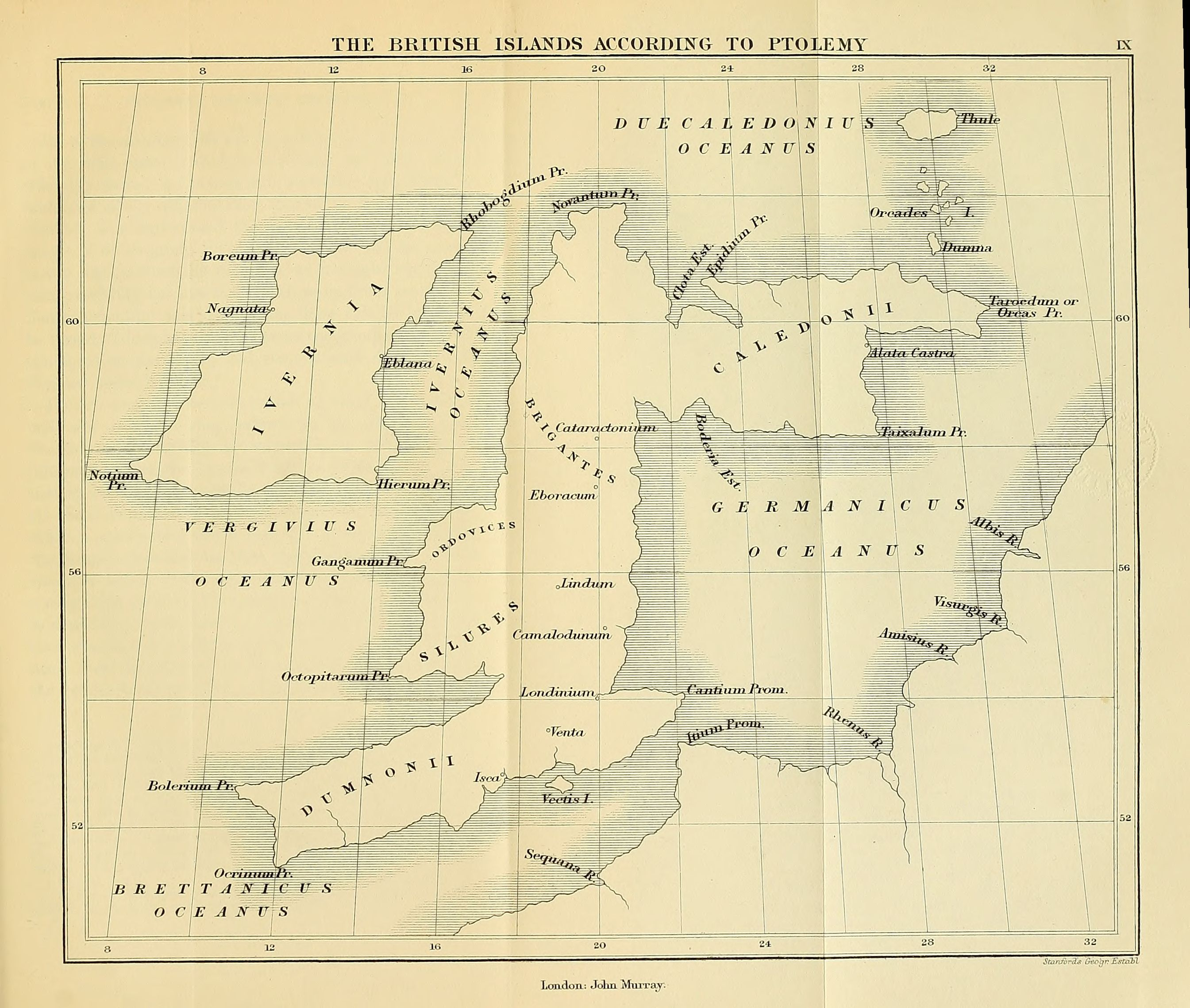
Map drawn from Claudius Ptolemy's cartographic works, showing his rotation of Caledonia to the east. From Edward Bunbury's A History of Ancient Geography Among the Greeks and Romans (1879)

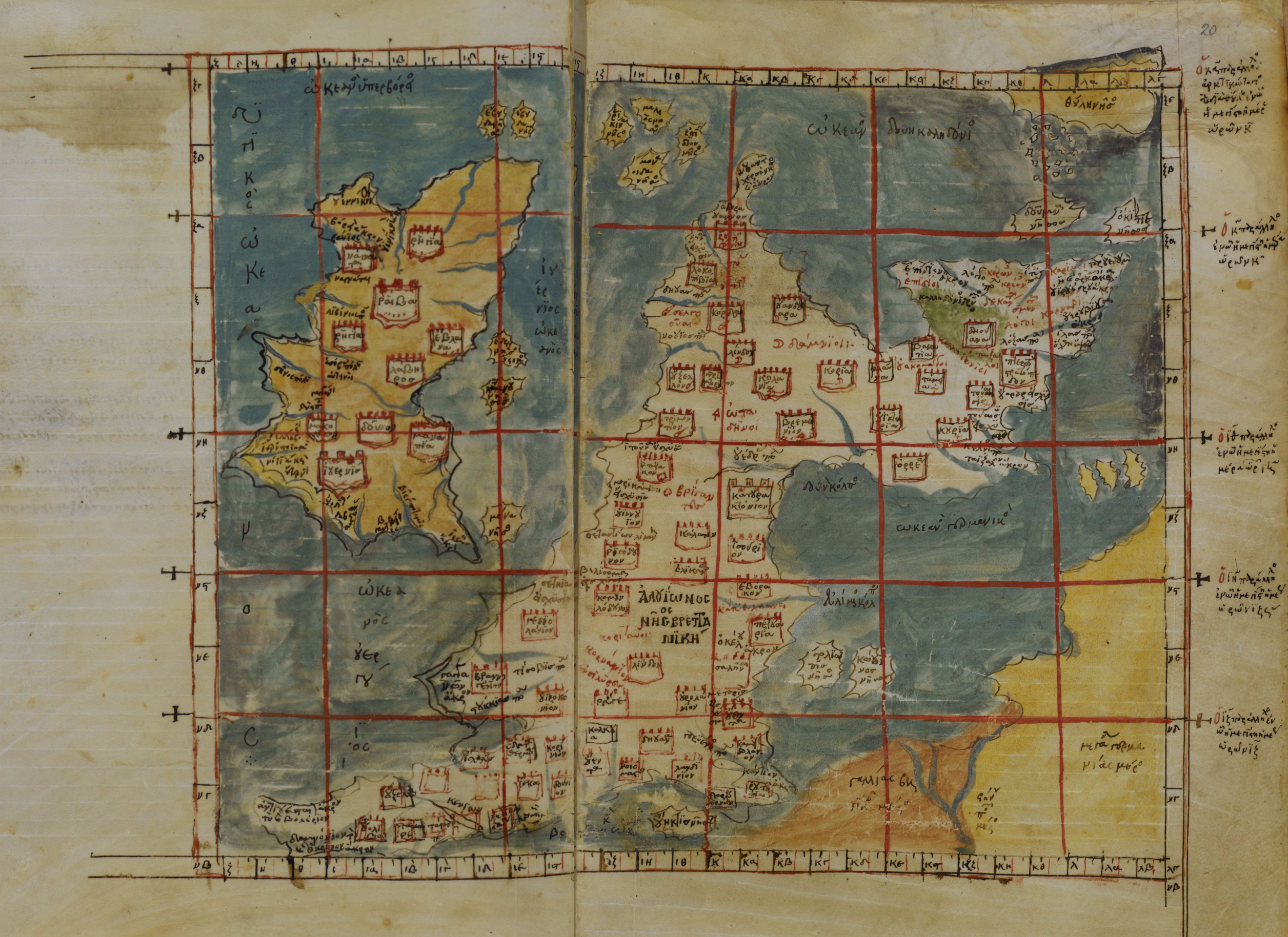
An early Greek map (c. 1300) from Ptolemy's description of the British Isles

== Roman geography ==
Scotland had been inhabited for thousands of years before the Romans arrived. However, it is only during the Greco-Roman period that Scotland is recorded in writing.

The work On the Cosmos by Aristotle or Pseudo-Aristotle mentions two "very large" islands called Albion (Great Britain) and Ierne (Ireland). (Note: Ancient Greek: "... ἐν τούτῳ γε μὴν νῆσοι μέγιστοι τυνχάνουσιν οὖσαι δύο, Βρεττανικαὶ λεγόμεναι, Ἀλβίων καὶ Ἰέρνη...", ... en toútōi ge mēn nēsoi mēgistoi tynkhánousin oúsai dúo, Brettanikaì legómenai, Albíōn kaì Iérnē..., "... there are two very large islands in it called the Britannic Islands, Albion and Hibernia...") The Greek explorer and geographer Pytheas visited Britain sometime between 322 and 285 BC and may have circumnavigated the mainland, which he describes as being triangular in shape. In his work On the Ocean, he refers to the most northerly point as Orcas (Orkney).

Originals of On the Ocean do not survive, but copies are known to have existed in the first century so at the least a rudimentary knowledge of the geography of north Britain would have been available to Roman military intelligence. Pomponius Mela, the Roman geographer, recorded in his De Chorographia, written around AD 43, that there were 30 Orkney islands and seven Haemodae (possibly Shetland). There is certainly evidence of an Orcadian connection with Rome prior to AD 60 from pottery found at the Broch of Gurness. By the time of Pliny the Elder (d. AD 79), Roman knowledge of the geography of Scotland had extended to the Hebudes (The Hebrides), Dumna (probably the Outer Hebrides), the Caledonian Forest, and the Caledonians. A traveller called Demetrius of Tarsus related to Plutarch the tale of an expedition to the west coast in or shortly before AD 83. He stated that it was "a gloomy journey amongst uninhabited islands" but that he had visited one which was the retreat of holy men. He mentioned neither the druids nor the name of the island.

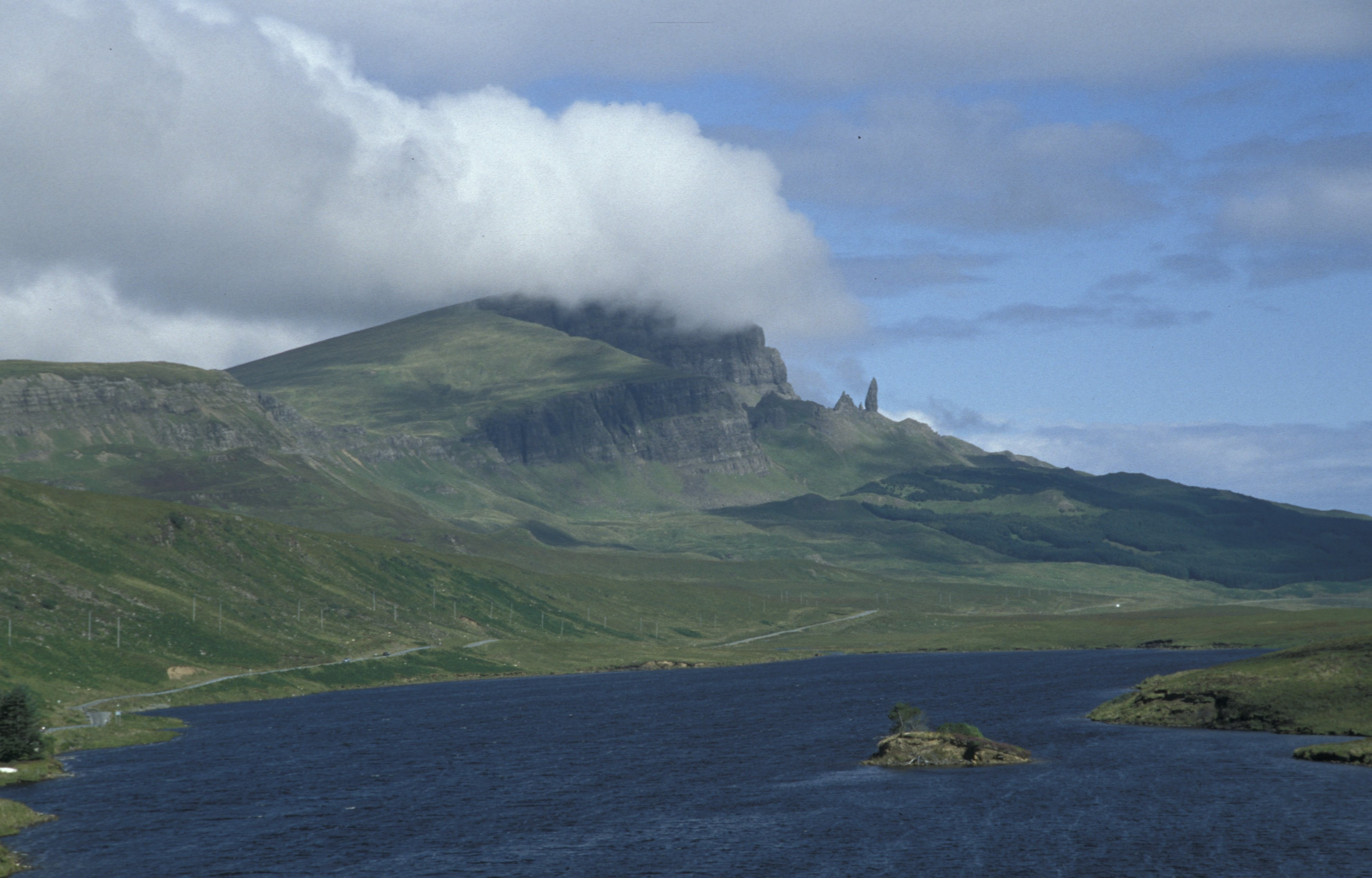
"A gloomy journey amongst uninhabited islands" – Demetrius of Tarsus

Ptolemy, possibly drawing on earlier sources of information as well as more contemporary accounts from the Agricolan invasion, identified 18 tribes in Scotland in his Geography, but many of the names are obscure. His information becomes much less reliable in the north and west, suggesting early Roman knowledge of these areas were confined to observations from the sea. Famously, his co-ordinates place most of Scotland north of Hadrian's Wall bent at a right angle, stretching due eastward from the rest of Britain.

Ptolemy's catalogue of tribes living north of the Forth-Clyde isthmus include the Caereni, Smertae, Carnonacae, Decantae, Lugi, and Creones all to the north of the Great Glen, the Cornovii in Caithness, the Taexali in the north-east, the Epidii in Argyll, the Venicones in Fife, the Vacomagi centred near Strathmore, the Caledonians in the central Highlands.

== Flavian period (69–96 AD) ==
The earliest written record of a formal connection between Rome and Scotland is the attendance of the "King of Orkney" who was one of 11 British kings who submitted to the emperor Claudius at Colchester in AD 43 following the invasion of southern Britain three months earlier. The long distances and short period of time involved strongly suggest a prior connection between Rome and Orkney, although no evidence of this has been found and the contrast with later Caledonian resistance is striking.

Pomponius Mela, the Roman geographer, recorded in his De Chorographia, written c. 43 AD, that there were thirty Orkney islands. There is certainly evidence of an Orcadian connection with Rome prior to AD 60 from pottery found at the Broch of Gurness and 1st and 2nd century Roman coins have been found at Lingro broch.

However the apparently cordial beginnings recorded in Colchester did not last. We know nothing of the foreign policies of the senior leaders in mainland Scotland in the first century, but by AD 71 the Roman governor Quintus Petillius Cerialis had launched an invasion.

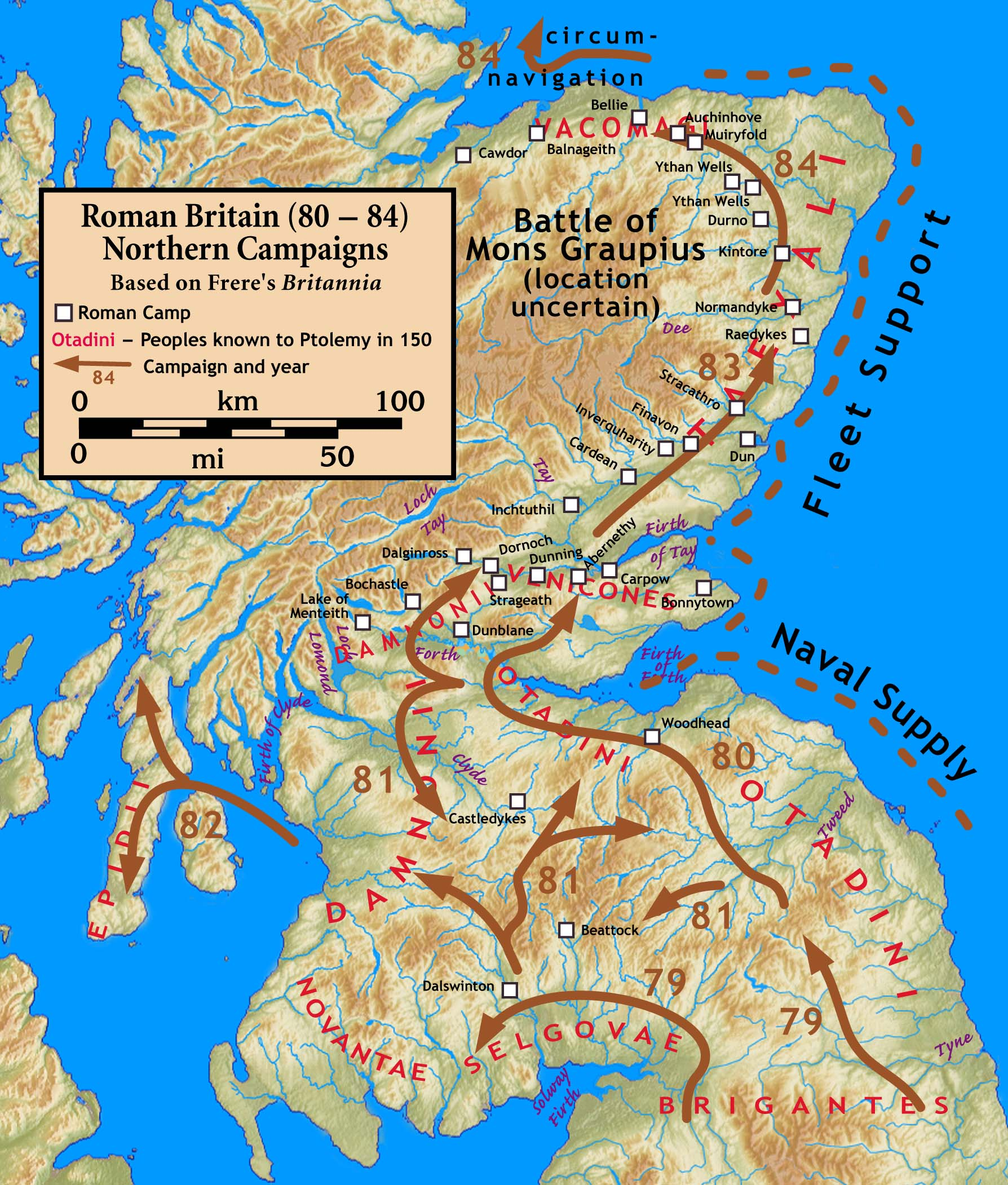
Campaigns in Scotland in the early 80s

The Votadini, who occupied the south-east of Scotland, came under Roman sway at an early stage and Cerialis sent one division north through their territory to the shores of the Firth of Forth. The Legio XX Valeria Victrix took a western route through Annandale in an attempt to encircle and isolate the Selgovae who occupied the central Southern Uplands. Early success tempted Cerialis further north and he began constructing a line of Glenblocker forts to the north and west of the Gask Ridge which marked a frontier between the Venicones to the south and the Caledonians to the north.

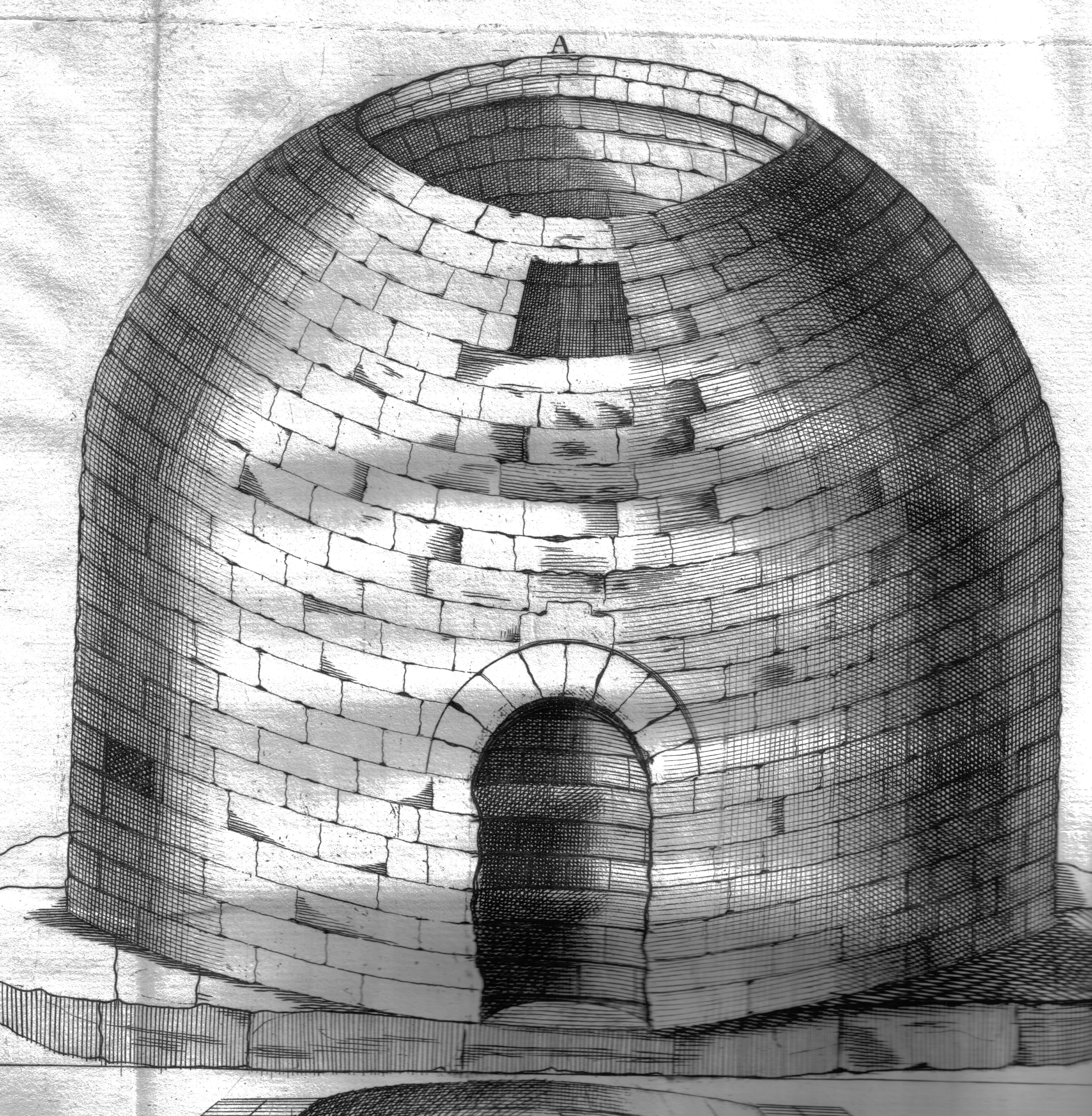
Arthur's O'on, a Roman monument at Stenhousemuir near Falkirk, from Alexander Gordon's 1726 work Itinerarium Septentrionale. It was demolished for its stone 17 years later.

In the summer of AD 78 Gnaeus Julius Agricola arrived in Britain to take up his appointment as the new governor. Two years later his legions constructed a substantial fort at Trimontium near Melrose. Excavations in the twentieth century produced significant finds including the foundations of several successive structures, Roman coins and pottery. Remains from the Roman army were also found, including a collection of Roman armour (with ornate cavalry parade helmets), and horse fittings (with bronze saddleplates and studded leather chamfrons). Agricola is said to have pushed his armies to the estuary of the "River Taus" (usually assumed to be the River Tay) and established forts there, including a legionary fortress at Inchtuthil.

In 2019, the GUARD Archaeology team led by Iraia Arabaolaza uncovered a marching camp dating to the first century AD in Ayr, used by Roman legions during the invasion of Roman General Agricola. According to Arabaolaza, the fire pits were split 30 metres apart into two parallel lines. The findings also included clay-domed ovens and 26 fire pits dated to between 77- 86 AD and 90 AD loaded with burn and charcoal contents. Archaeologists suggested that this site had been chosen as a strategic location for the Roman conquest of Ayrshire.

=== Battle of Mons Graupius ===
In the summer of AD 84, the Romans faced the massed armies of the Caledonians at the Battle of Mons Graupius. Agricola, whose forces included a fleet, arrived at the site with light infantry bolstered with British auxiliaries. It is estimated that a total of 20,000 Romans faced 30,000 Caledonian warriors.

Agricola put his auxiliaries in the front line, keeping the legions in reserve, and relied on close-quarters fighting to make the Caledonians' unpointed slashing swords useless. Even though the Caledonians were put to rout and therefore lost this battle, two-thirds of their army managed to escape and hide in the Scottish Highlands or the "trackless wilds" as Tacitus called them. Battle casualties were estimated by Tacitus to be about 10,000 on the Caledonian side and roughly 360 on the Roman side. A number of authors have reckoned the battle to have occurred in the Grampian Mounth within sight of the North Sea. In particular, Roy, Surenne, Watt, Hogan and others have advanced notions that the site of the battle may have been Kempstone Hill, Megray Hill or other knolls near the Raedykes Roman camp. These points of high ground are proximate to the Elsick Mounth, an ancient trackway used by Romans and Caledonians for military manoeuvres. Other suggestions include the hill of Bennachie in Aberdeenshire, the Gask Ridge not far from Perth and Sutherland. It has also been suggested that in the absence of any archaeological evidence and Tacitus' low estimates of Roman casualties, that the battle was simply fabricated.

==== Calgacus ====
The first resident of Scotland to appear in history by name was Calgacus ("the Swordsman"), a leader of the Caledonians at Mons Graupius, who is referred to by Tacitus in the Agricola as "the most distinguished for birth and valour among the chieftains". Tacitus even invented a speech for him in advance of the battle in which he describes the Romans as:

Robbers of the world, having by their universal plunder exhausted the land, they rifle the deep. If the enemy be rich, they are rapacious; if he be poor, they lust for dominion; neither the east nor the west has been able to satisfy them. Alone among men they covet with equal eagerness poverty and riches. To robbery, slaughter, plunder, they give the lying name of empire; they make a solitude and call it peace.

==== Aftermath ====
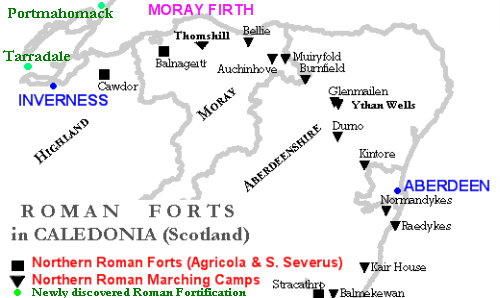
Actual and possible Roman camp sites in the northeast

Calgacus' fate is unknown but, according to Tacitus, after the battle Agricola ordered the prefect of the fleet to sail around the north of Scotland to confirm that Britain was an island and to receive the surrender of the Orcadians. It was proclaimed that Agricola had finally subdued all the tribes of Britain. However, the Roman historian Cassius Dio reports that this circumnavigation resulted in Titus receiving his fifteenth acclamation as emperor in AD 79. This is five years before Mons Graupius is believed by most historians to have taken place. Marching camps may have been constructed along the southern shores of the Moray Firth, although their existence is questioned. Pinnata Castra, the location of which is uncertain, was identified by Ptolemy as the northernmost polis in Britain and may mark the limit of Agricola's advance by land.

=== Flavian occupation ===
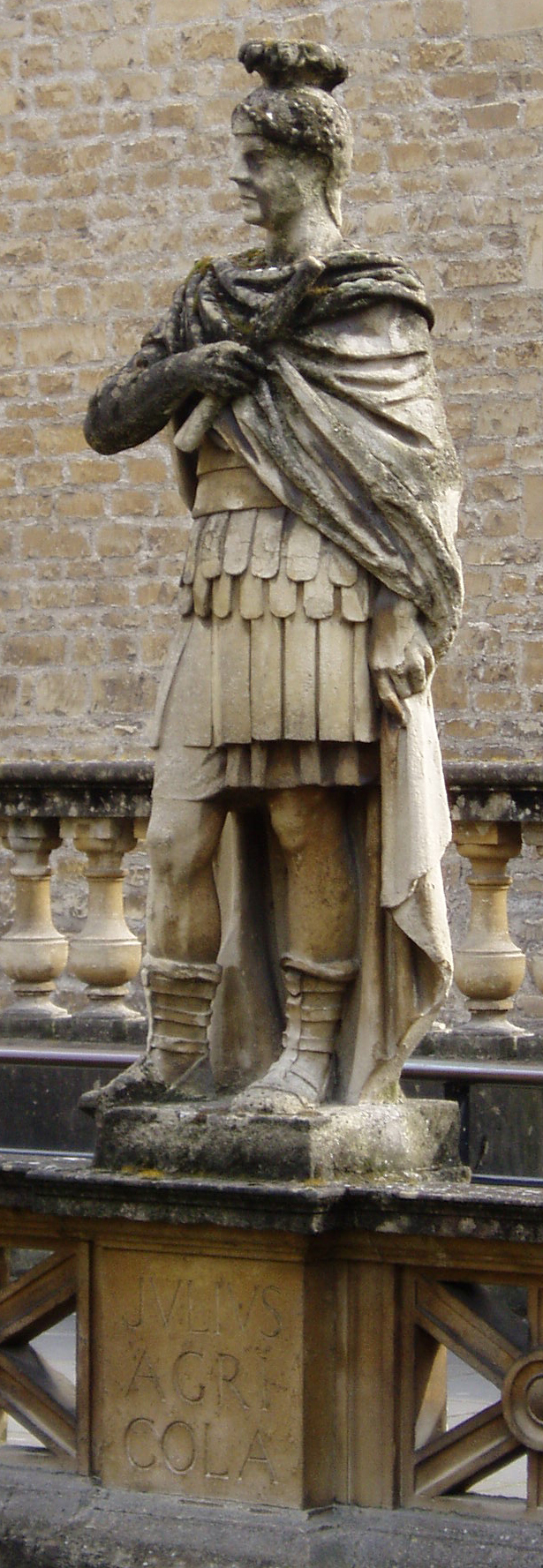
19th-century statue of Agricola in the Roman Baths at Bath, Somerset

The total size of the Roman garrison in Scotland during the Flavian period of occupation is thought to have been some 25,000 troops, requiring 16–19,000 tons of grain per annum. In addition, the material to construct the forts was substantial, estimated at 1 million cubic feet (28,315 m^{3}) of timber during the first century. Ten tons of buried nails were discovered at the Inchtuthil site, which may have had a garrison of up to 6,000 men and which itself consumed 30 linear kilometres of wood for the walls alone, which would have used up 100 hectares (250 acres) of forest.

Presumably as a consequence of the Roman advance, various hill forts such as Dun Mor in Perthshire, which had been abandoned by the natives long ago, were re-occupied. Some new ones may even have been constructed in the northeast, such as Hill O'Christ's Kirk in Aberdeenshire.

Soon after his announcement of victory, Agricola was recalled to Rome by Domitian and his post passed to an unknown successor, possibly Sallustius Lucullus. Agricola's successors were seemingly unable or unwilling to further subdue the far north. This inability to continue to hold the far north may be in part due to the limited military resources available to the Roman Proconsul after the recall of the Legio II Adiutrix from Britain, to support Domitian's war in Dacia. Despite his apparent successes, Agricola himself fell out of favour; one author has speculated that Domitian may have been informed that Agricola's claim to have won a significant victory was fraudulent. The fortress at Inchtuthil was dismantled before its completion and the other fortifications of the Gask Ridge (erected to consolidate the Roman presence in Scotland in the aftermath of Mons Graupius) were abandoned within the space of a few years. It is possible that the costs of a drawn-out war outweighed any economic or political benefit and it was deemed more profitable to leave the Caledonians to themselves. By AD 87 the occupation was limited to the Southern Uplands and by the end of the first century the northern limit of Roman expansion was the Stanegate road between the Tyne and Solway Firth.

== Hadrianic period (117–138) ==
=== Hadrian's Wall ===
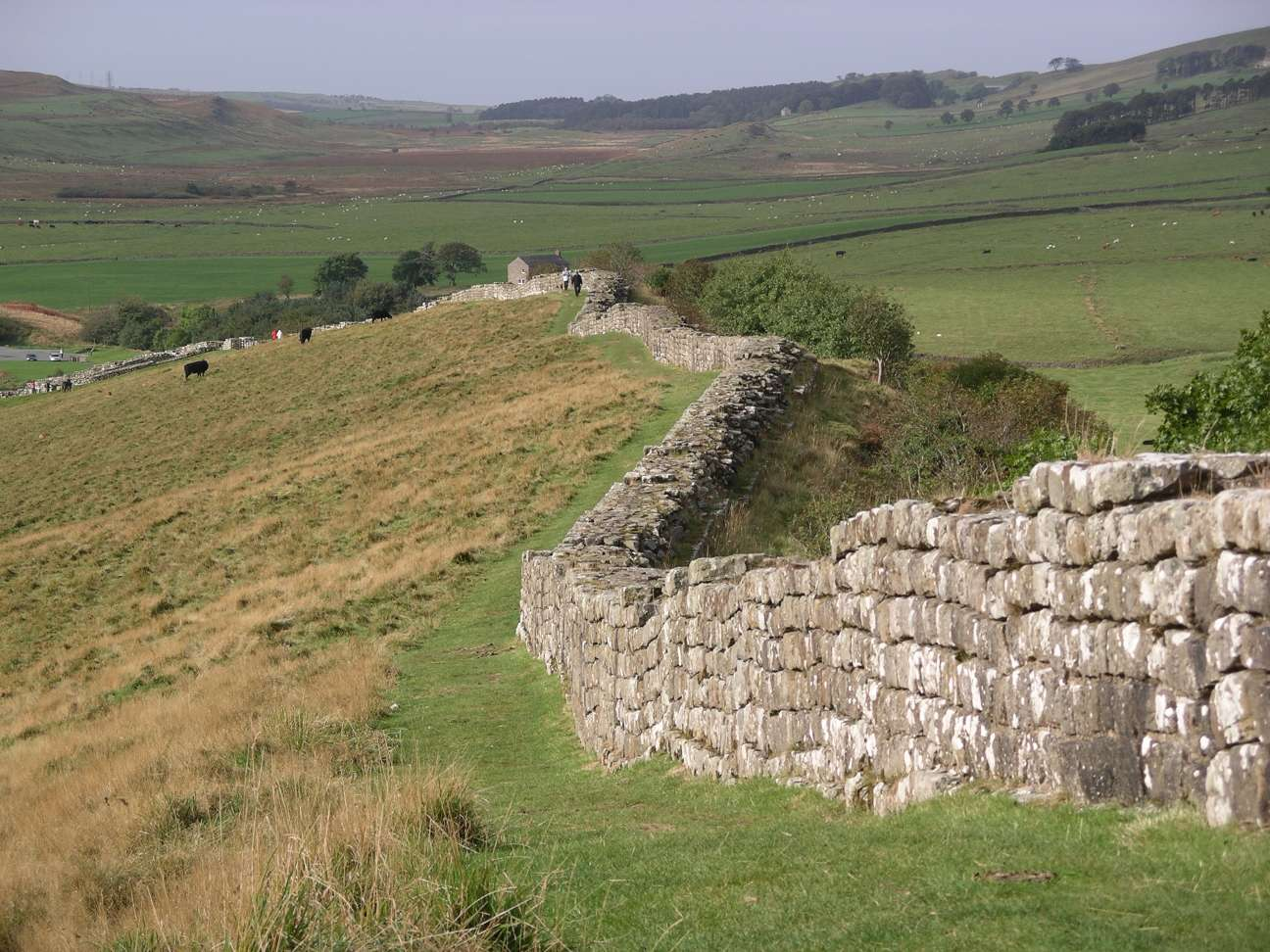
A section of Hadrian's Wall near Greenhead, Northumberland

Hadrian's Wall, 118 kilometres (73 mi) long, was constructed in the early 120s on the orders of the Emperor Hadrian. It consolidated the Roman line of defence (called the Limes Britannicus) on the Tyne-Solway line, where it remained until c. AD 139.

It was a stone and turf fortification built across the width of what is now northern England and was roughly 4 metres (13 ft) or more high along its length. The vallum Aelii, as the Romans called it, may have taken six years to construct. Small guard posts called milecastles were built at mile intervals with an additional two fortified observation points between them. The wall was wide enough to allow for a walkway along the top.

The purpose of the wall appears to have been in part at least to control contact between the subject Brigantes to its south and the client Selgovae to the north.

== Antonine period (138–161) ==
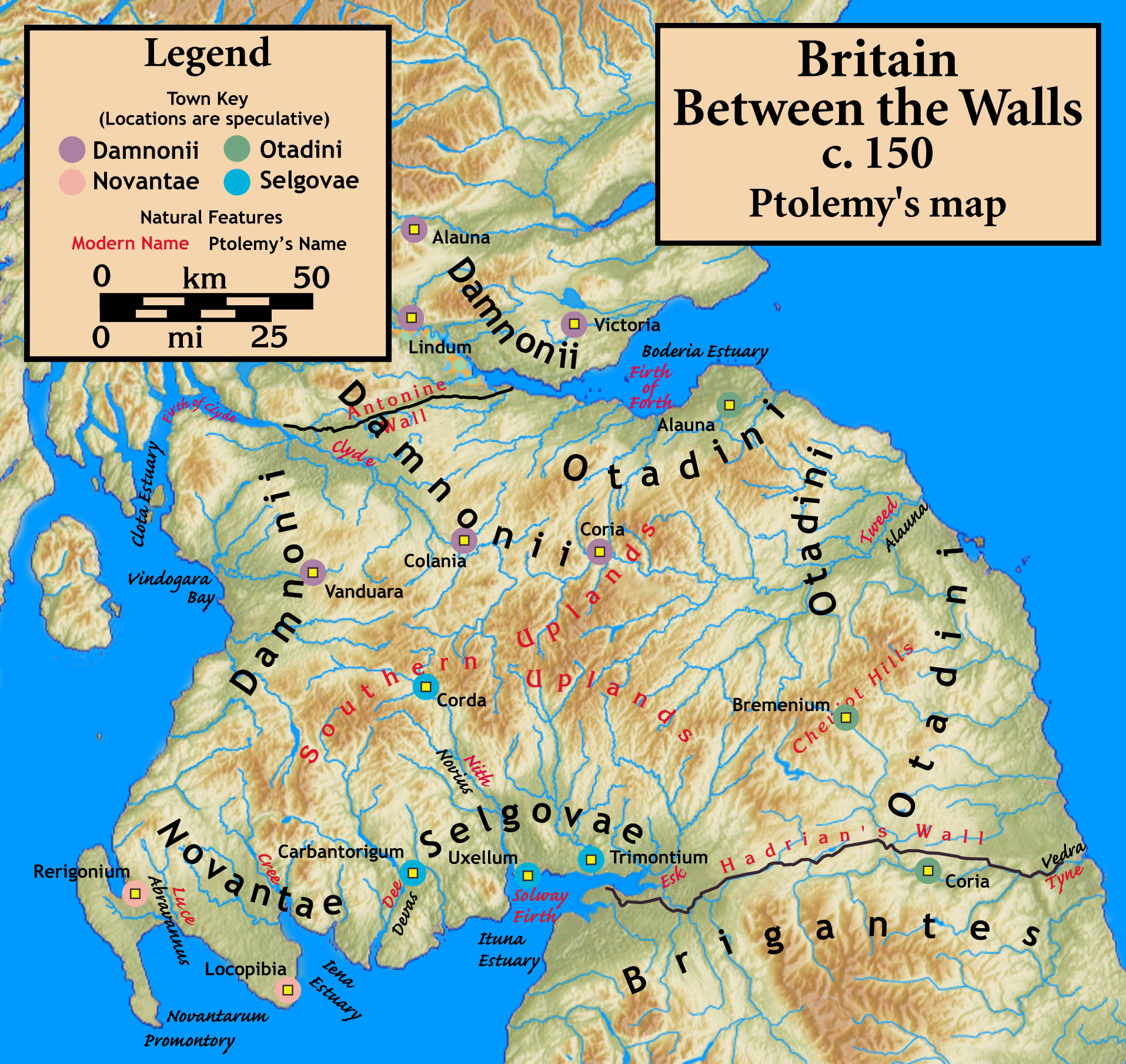
Southern Scotland in the reign of Antoninus Pius

Quintus Lollius Urbicus was made governor of Roman Britain in 138, by the new emperor Antoninus Pius. Urbicus was the son of a Libyan landowner and a native of Numidia (modern Algeria). Prior to coming to Britain he served during the Jewish Rebellion (132–35), and then governing Germania Inferior.

Antoninus Pius soon reversed the containment policy of his predecessor Hadrian, and Urbicus was ordered to begin the reconquest of Lowland Scotland by moving north. Between 139 and 140 he rebuilt the fort at Corbridge and by 142 or 143, commemorative coins were issued celebrating a victory in Britain. It is therefore likely that Urbicus led the reoccupation of southern Scotland c. 141, probably using the Legio II Augusta. He evidently campaigned against several British tribes (possibly including factions of the northern Brigantes), certainly against the lowland tribes of Scotland, the Votadini and Selgovae of the Scottish Borders region, and the Damnonii of Strathclyde. His total force may have been about 16,500 men.

It seems likely that Urbicus planned his campaign of attack from Corbridge, advancing north and leaving garrison forts at High Rochester in Northumberland and possibly also at Trimontium as he struck towards the Firth of Forth. Having secured an overland supply route for military personnel and equipment along Dere Street, Urbicus very likely set up a supply port at Carriden for the supply of grain and other foodstuffs before proceeding against the Damnonii; success was swift.

It was possibly after the defences of the Antonine Wall were finished that Urbicus turned his attention upon the fourth lowland Scottish tribe, the Novantae who inhabited the Dumfries and Galloway peninsula. The main lowland tribes, sandwiched as they were between Hadrian's Wall of stone to the south and the new turf wall to the north, later formed a confederation against Roman rule, collectively known as the Maeatae. The Antonine Wall had a variety of purposes. It provided a defensive line against the Caledonians. It cut off the Maeatae from their Caledonian allies and created a buffer zone north of Hadrian's Wall. It also facilitated troop movements between east and west, but its main purpose may not have been primarily military. It enabled Rome to control and tax trade and may have prevented potentially disloyal new subjects of Roman rule from communicating with their independent brethren to the north and coordinating revolts. Urbicus achieved an impressive series of military successes, but like Agricola's they were short-lived. Having taken twelve years to build, the wall was overrun and abandoned soon after AD 160.

The destruction of some of the southern brochs may date to the Antonine advance, the hypothesis being that whether or not they had previously been symbols of Roman patronage they had now outlived their usefulness from a Roman point of view.

In 1984, a candidate for a Roman fort was identified by aerial photography at Easter Galcantray, southwest of Cawdor. The site was excavated between 1984 and 1988 and several features were identified which are supportive of this classification. If confirmed, it would be one of the most northerly known Roman forts in the British Isles.

The possibility that the legions reached further north in Scotland is suggested by discoveries in Easter Ross. The sites of temporary camps have been proposed at Portmahomack in 1949, although this has not been confirmed. In 1991 an investigation of Tarradale on the Black Isle near the Beauly Firth concluded "the site appears to conform to the morphology of a Roman camp or fort".

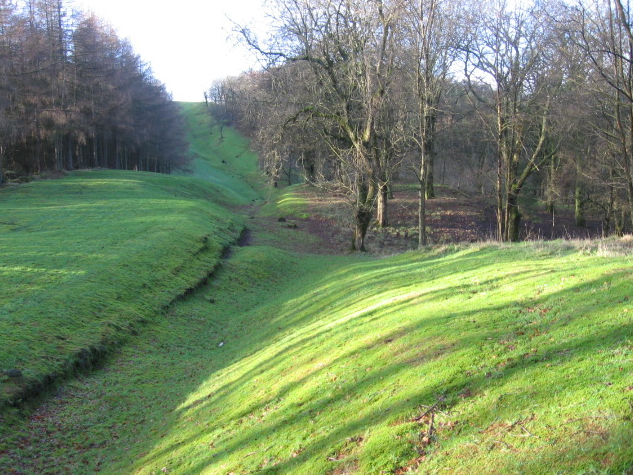
The course of the Antonine Wall, at Bar Hill

=== Antonine Wall ===
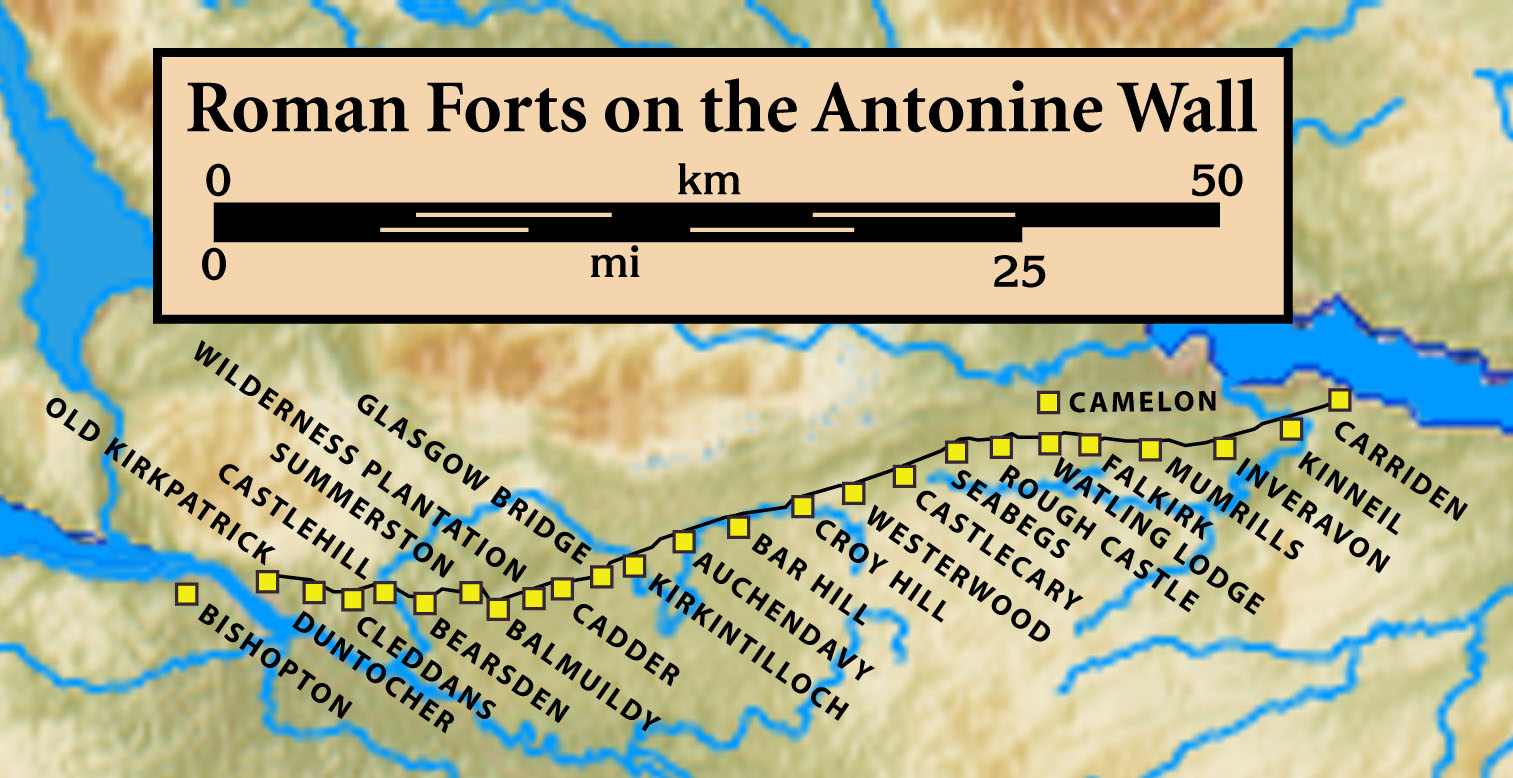
Forts and fortlets associated with the Antonine Wall from west to east: Bishopton, Old Kilpatrick, Duntocher, Cleddans, Castlehill, Bearsden, Summerston, Balmuildy, Wilderness Plantation, Cadder, Glasgow Bridge, Kirkintilloch, Auchendavy, Bar Hill, Croy Hill, Westerwood, Castlecary, Seabegs, Rough Castle, Camelon, Watling Lodge, Falkirk, Mumrills, Inveravon, Kinneil, Carriden

Construction of a new limes between the Firth of Forth and the Firth of Clyde commenced. Contingents from at least one British legion are known to have assisted in the erection of the new turf barrier, as evidenced by an inscription from the fort at Old Kilpatrick, the Antonine Wall's western terminus. Today, the sward-covered wall is the remains of a defensive line made of turf circa 7 metres (23 feet) high, with nineteen forts. It was constructed after AD 139 and extended for 60 km (37 mi).

== Severan period (193–235) ==
The Roman frontier became Hadrian's Wall again, although Roman incursions into Scotland continued. Initially, outpost forts were occupied in the south-west and Trimontium remained in use but they too were abandoned after the mid-180s. Roman troops, however, penetrated far into the north of modern Scotland several more times. Indeed, there is a greater density of Roman marching camps in Scotland than anywhere else in Europe, as a result of at least four major attempts to subdue the area. The Antonine Wall was occupied again for a brief period after AD 197. The most notable invasion was in 209 when the emperor Septimius Severus, claiming to be provoked by the belligerence of the Maeatae, campaigned against the Caledonian Confederacy. Severus invaded Caledonia with an army perhaps over 40,000 strong.

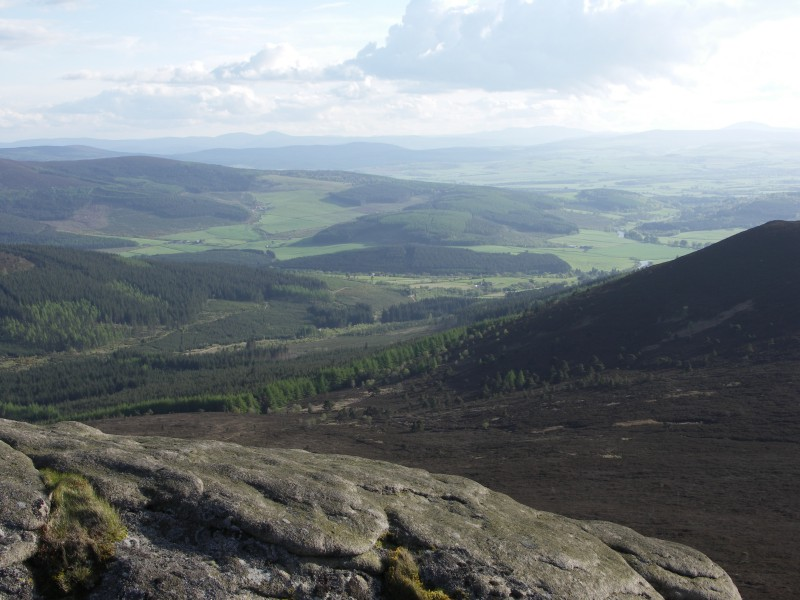
Rural Aberdeenshire, looking from the heights of Bennachie towards the lower-lying land in which Roman camps were situated.

According to Dio Cassius, he inflicted genocidal depredations on the natives and incurred the loss of 50,000 of his own men to the attrition of guerrilla tactics, although it is likely that these figures are a significant exaggeration.

A string of forts was constructed in the northeast (some of which may date from the earlier Antonine campaign). These include camps associated with the Elsick Mounth, such as Normandykes, Ythan Wells, Deers Den and Glenmailen. However, only two forts in Scotland, at Cramond and Carpow (in the Tay valley) are definitely known to have been permanently occupied during this incursion before the troops were withdrawn again to Hadrian's Wall circa 213. There is some evidence that these campaigns are coincident with the wholesale destruction and abandonment of souterrains in southern Scotland. This may have been due either to Roman military aggression or the collapse of local grain markets in the wake of Roman withdrawal.

By 210, Severus' campaigning had made significant gains, but his campaign was cut short when he fell fatally ill, dying at Eboracum in 211. Although his son Caracalla continued campaigning the following year, he soon settled for peace. The Romans never campaigned deep into Caledonia again: they soon withdrew south permanently to Hadrian's Wall. From the time of Caracalla onwards, no further attempts were made to permanently occupy territory in Scotland.

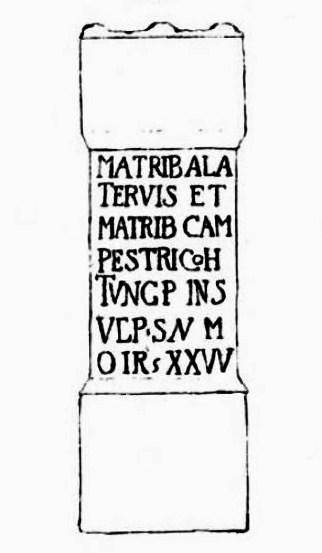
The inscription on the Roman altar at Cramond Roman Fort dedicated to the mothers of Alaterva and of the fields.

It was during the negotiations to purchase the truce necessary to secure the Roman retreat to the wall that the first recorded utterance, attributable with any reasonable degree of confidence, to a native of Scotland was made. When Julia Domna, wife of Septimius Severus, criticised the sexual morals of the Caledonian women, the wife (whose name is unknown) of the Caledonian chief Argentocoxos allegedly replied: "We fulfil the demands of nature in a much better way than do you Roman women; for we consort openly with the best men, whereas you let yourselves be debauched in secret by the vilest."

== Picts ==
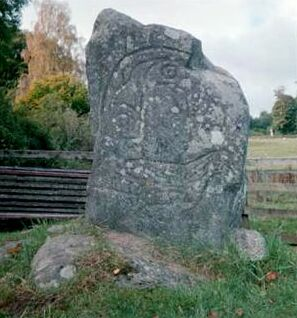
Clach an Tiompain, a Pictish symbol stone in Strathpeffer

The intermittent Roman presence in Scotland coincided with the emergence of the Picts, a confederation of tribes who lived to the north of the Forth and Clyde from Roman times until the tenth century. They are often assumed to have been the descendants of the Caledonians though the evidence for this connection is circumstantial and the name by which the Picts called themselves is unknown. They are often said to have tattooed themselves, but evidence for this is limited. Naturalistic depictions of Pictish nobles, hunters and warriors, male and female, without obvious tattoos, are found on their monumental stones. The Gaels of Dalriada called the Picts Cruithne, and Irish poets portrayed their Pictish counterparts as very much like themselves.

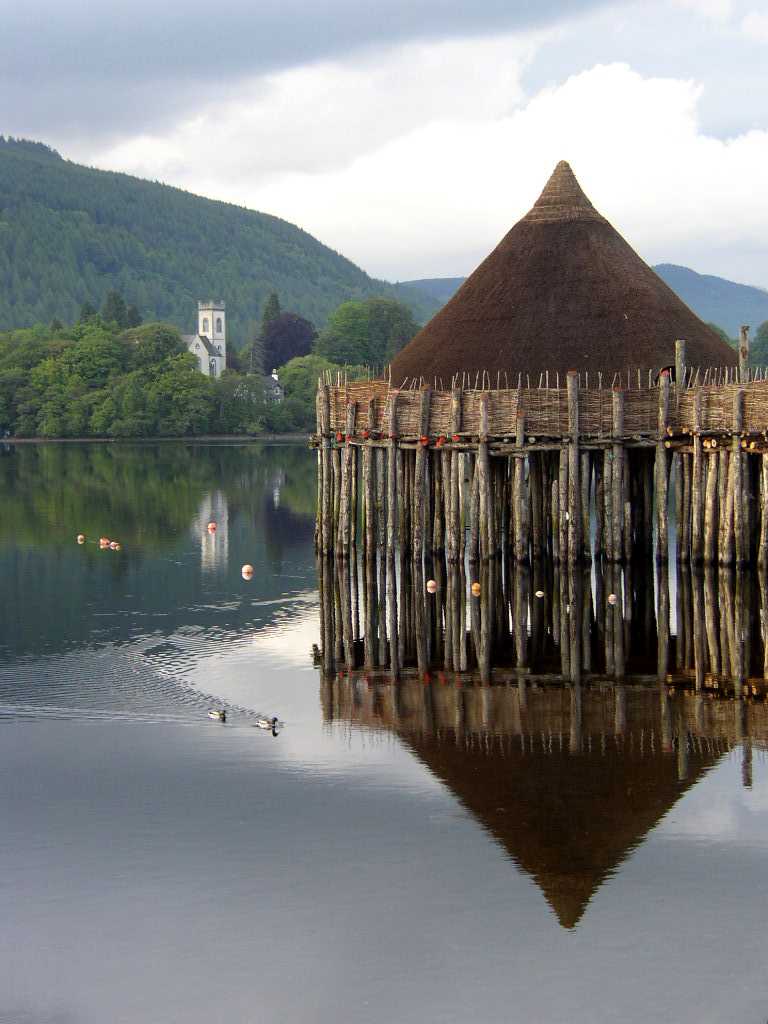
Reconstructed crannog on Loch Tay

The technology of everyday life is not well recorded, but archaeological evidence shows it to have been similar to that in Ireland and Anglo-Saxon England. Recently evidence has been found of watermills in Pictland and kilns were used for drying kernels of wheat or barley, not otherwise easy in the changeable, temperate climate. Although constructed in earlier times, brochs, roundhouses and crannogs remained in use into and beyond the Pictish period.

Elsewhere in Scotland wheelhouses were constructed, probably for ritualistic purposes, in the west and north. Their geographical locations are highly restricted, which suggests that they may have been contained within a political or cultural frontier of some kind and the co-incidence of their arrival and departure being associated with the period of Roman influence in Scotland is a matter of ongoing debate. It is not known whether the culture that constructed them was "Pictish" as such although they would certainly have been known to the Picts.

== Late Antiquity ==
Later excursions by the Romans were generally limited to the scouting expeditions in the buffer zone that developed between the walls, trading contacts, bribes to purchase truces from the natives, and eventually the spread of Christianity. The Ravenna Cosmography utilises a third- or fourth-century Roman map and identifies four loci (meeting places, possibly markets) in southern Scotland. Locus Maponi is possibly the Lochmaben Stone near modern Gretna which continued to be used as a muster point well into the historic period. Two of the others indicate meeting places of the Damnonii and Selgovae, and the fourth, Manavi may be Clackmannan.

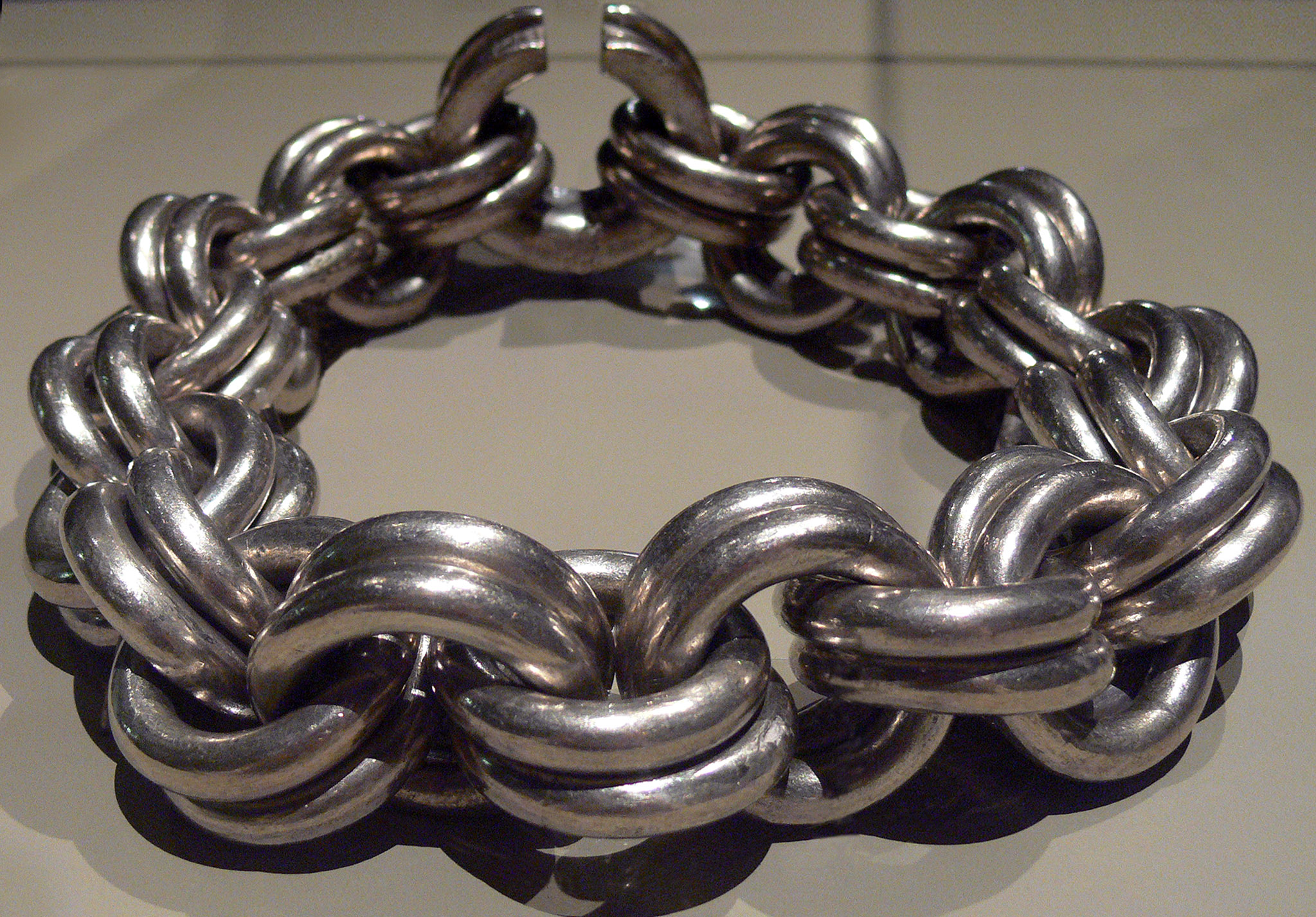
The Whitecleuch Chain, a silver Pictish torc

The Pictish relationship with Rome appears to have been less overtly hostile than their Caledonian predecessors, at least in the beginning. There were no more pitched battles and conflict was generally limited to raiding parties from both sides of the frontier until immediately prior to and after the Roman retreat from Britannia. Their apparent success in holding back Roman forces cannot be explained solely with reference to the remoteness of Caledonia or the difficulties of the terrain. In part, it may have been due to the difficulties encountered in subjugating a population that did not conform to the strictures of local governance that Roman power usually depended on to operate through.

As Rome's power waned, the Picts were emboldened. War bands raided south of Hadrian's Wall in earnest in 342, 360, and 365 and they participated with the Attacotti in the Great Conspiracy of 367. Rome fought back, mounting a campaign under Count Theodosius in 369 which reëstablished a province which was renamed Valentia in honour of the emperor. Its location is unclear, but it is sometimes placed on or beyond Hadrian's Wall. Another campaign was mounted in 384, but both were short-lived successes. Stilicho, the magister militum, may have fought a war against the Picts in Britain in around 398. Rome had fully withdrawn from Britain by 410, never to return.

Roman influence assisted the spread of Christianity throughout Europe, but there is little evidence of a direct link between the Roman Empire and Christian missions north of Hadrian's Wall. Traditionally, Ninian is credited as the first bishop active in Scotland. He is briefly mentioned by Bede who states that around 397 he set up his base at Whithorn in the south-west of Scotland, building a stone church there, known as Candida Casa. More recently it has been suggested that Ninian was the sixth-century missionary Finnian of Moville, but either way Roman influence on early Christianity in Scotland does not seem to have been significant.

== Legacy ==
=== Historical ===
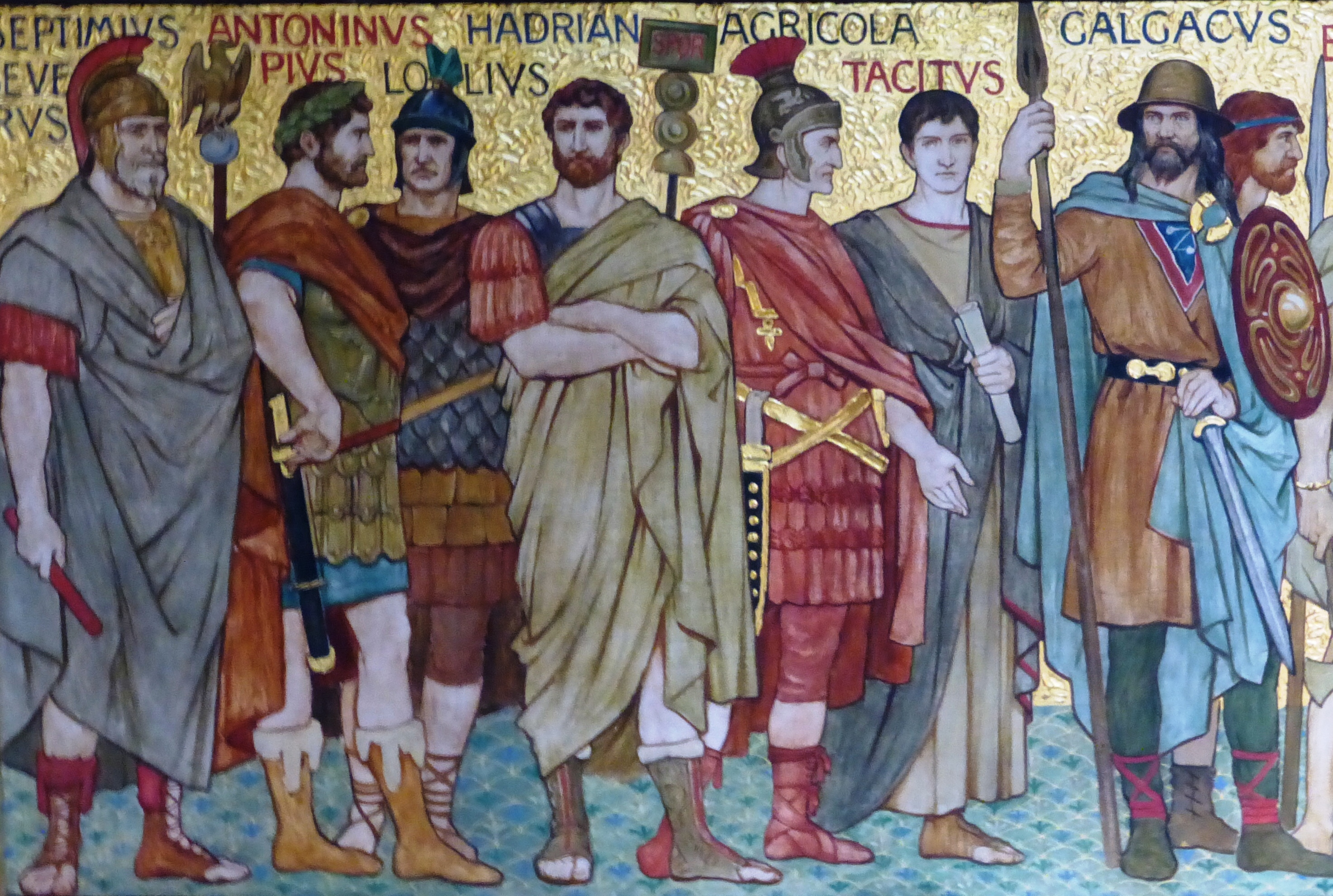
Notable figures from the Roman period in Scottish history, as depicted by the Victorian artist William Hole in the Scottish National Portrait Gallery in Edinburgh.

The military presence of Rome lasted for little more than 40 years for most of Scotland and only as much as 80 years in total anywhere. It's now generally considered that at no time was even half of Scotland's land mass under Roman control.

Scotland has inherited two main features from the Roman period, although mostly indirectly: the use of the Latin script for its languages and the emergence of Christianity as the predominant religion. Through Christianity, the Latin language would become used by the natives of Scotland for the purposes of church and government for centuries more.

Although little more than a series of relatively brief interludes of military occupation, Imperial Rome was ruthless and brutal in pursuit of its ends. Genocide was a familiar part of its foreign policy and it is clear that the invasions and occupations cost thousands of lives. Alistair Moffat writes:

The reality is that the Romans came to what is now Scotland, they saw, burned, killed, stole and occasionally conquered, and then they left a tremendous mess behind them, clearing away native settlements and covering good farmland with the remains of ditches, banks, roads, and other sorts of ancient military debris. Like most imperialists, they arrived to make money, gain political advantage and exploit the resources of their colonies at virtually any price to the conquered. And remarkably, in Britain, in Scotland, we continue to admire them for it.

All the more surprising given that the Vindolanda tablets show that the Roman nickname for the north British locals was Brittunculi meaning "nasty little Britons".

Similarly, William Hanson concludes that:

For many years it has been almost axiomatic in studies of the period that the Roman conquest must have had some major medium or long-term impact on Scotland. On present evidence that cannot be substantiated either in terms of environment, economy, or, indeed, society. The impact appears to have been very limited. The general picture remains one of broad continuity, not of disruption.... The Roman presence in Scotland was little more than a series of brief interludes within a longer continuum of indigenous development."

The Romans' part in the clearances of the once extensive Caledonian forest remains a matter of debate. That these forests were once considerably more extensive than they are now is not in dispute, but the timing and causes of the reduction are. The sixteenth-century writer Hector Boece believed that the woods in Roman times stretched north from Stirling into Atholl and Lochaber and was inhabited by white bulls with "crisp and curland mane, like feirs lionis". Later historians such as Patrick Fraser Tytler and William Forbes Skene followed suit as did the twentieth-century naturalist Frank Fraser Darling. Modern techniques, including palynology and dendrochronology suggest a more complex picture. Changing post-glacial climates may have allowed for a maximum forest cover between 4000 and 3000 BC and deforestation of the Southern uplands, caused both climatically and anthropogenically, was well underway by the time the legions arrived. Extensive analyses of Black Loch in Fife suggest that arable land spread at the expense of forest from about 2000 BC until the first-century Roman advance. Thereafter, there was re-growth of birch, oak and hazel for a period of five centuries, suggesting the invasions had a very negative impact on the native population. The situation outside the Roman-held areas is harder to assess, but the long-term influence of Rome may not have been substantial.

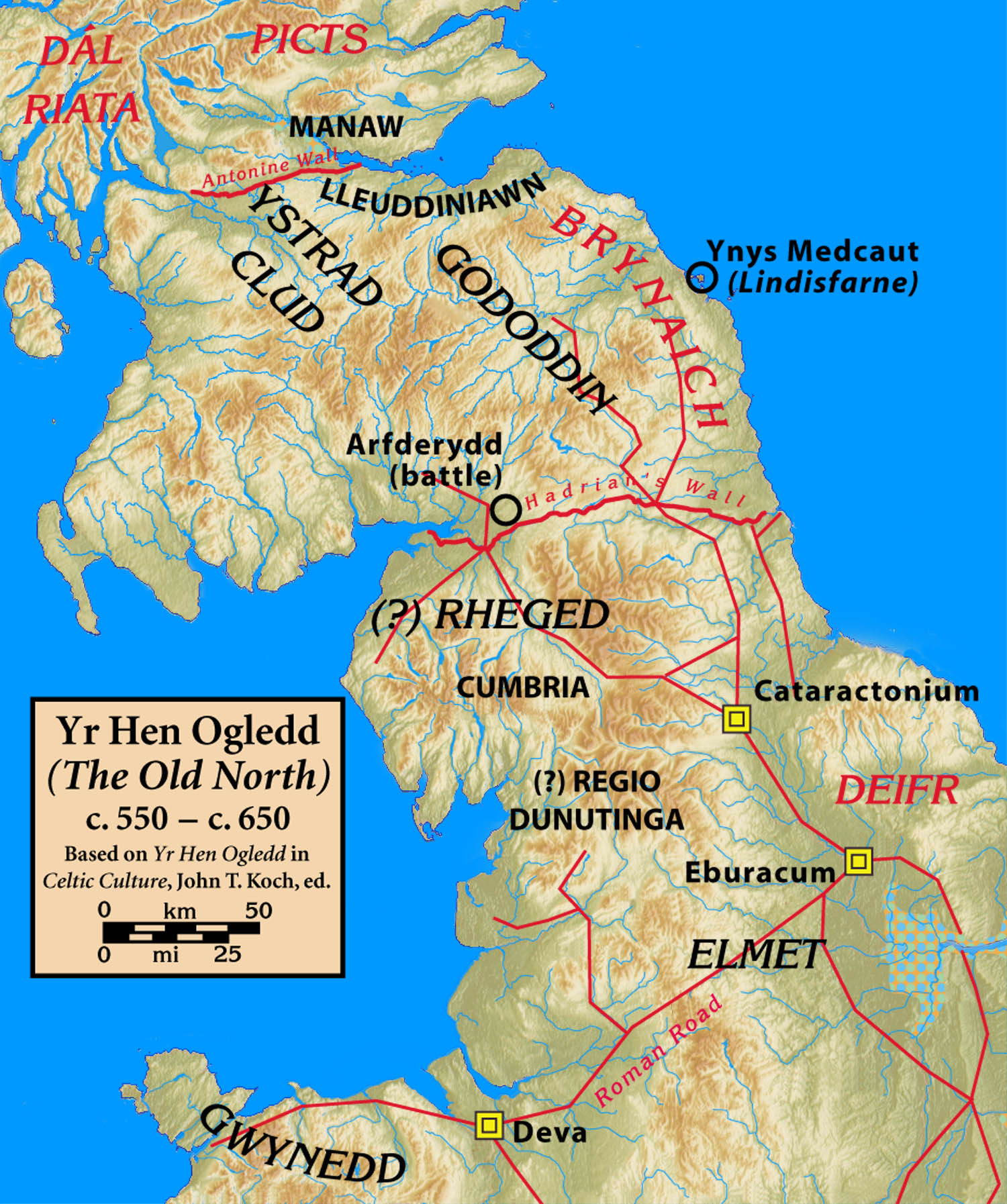
Hen Ogledd

The archaeological legacy of Rome in Scotland is of interest, but sparse, especially in the north. Almost all the sites are essentially military in nature and include about 650 km (400 mi) of roads. Overall, it is hard to detect any direct connections between native architecture and settlement patterns and Roman influence. Elsewhere in Europe, new kingdoms and languages emerged from the remnants of the once-mighty Roman world. In Scotland, the Celtic Iron Age way of life, often troubled, but never extinguished by Rome, simply re-asserted itself. In the north the Picts continued to be the main power prior to the arrival and subsequent domination of the Scots of Dalriada. The Damnonii eventually formed the Kingdom of Strathclyde based at Dumbarton Rock. South of the Forth, the Cumbric speaking Brythonic kingdoms of Yr Hen Ogledd (English: "The Old North") flourished during the fifth to seventh centuries, later supplanted by Anglo-Saxon settlement and the formation of Northumbria in the land between the Humber and the River Forth.

The most enduring Roman legacy may be that created by Hadrian's Wall. Its line approximates the border between modern Scotland and England and it created a distinction between the northern third and southern two-thirds of the island of Great Britain that plays a part in modern political debate. This is probably coincidental however, as there is little to suggest its influence played an important role in the early Medieval period after the fall of Rome.

=== In fiction ===
The Legio IX Hispana participated in the Roman invasion of Britain, suffering losses under Quintus Petillius Cerialis in the rebellion of Boudica of 61, and setting up a fortress in 71 that later became part of Eboracum. Although some authors have claimed that the ninth Legion disappeared in 117, there are extant records for it later than that year, and it was probably annihilated in the east of the Roman Empire. For a time it was believed, at least by some British historians, that the legion vanished during its conflicts in present-day Scotland. This idea was used in the novels The Eagle of the Ninth by Rosemary Sutcliff, Legion From the Shadows by Karl Edward Wagner, Red Shift by Alan Garner, Engine City by Ken MacLeod, Warriors of Alavna by N. M. Browne, and in the feature films The Last Legion, Centurion and The Eagle.

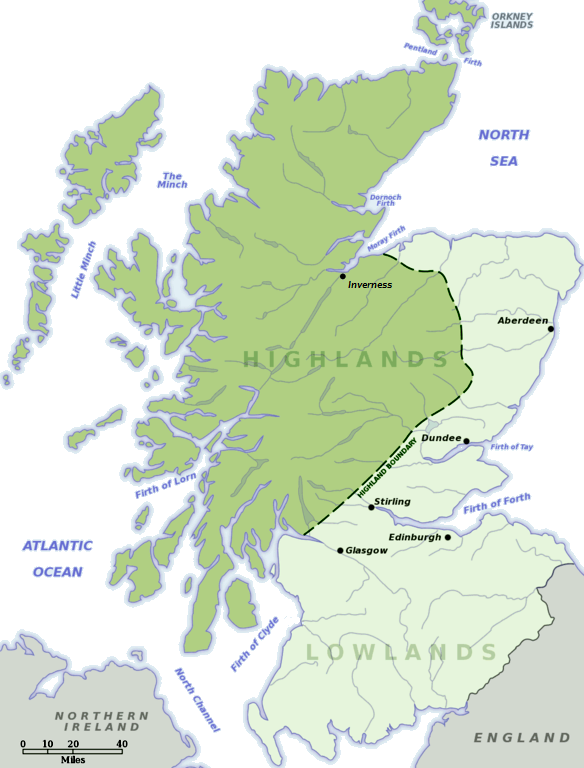
Cawdor Roman Fort is near Inverness, exactly at the top northern limit of the "Lowlands". The Caledonia area east of the border line between Highlands and Lowlands is the one were there are remains of roman presence (fortifications, roads, etc..), while to the west & north there it is nearly nothing "roman" (with the exception of the Orkney islands, where have been found roman vestiges after the submission of the "King of Orkney" to the emperor Claudius at Colchester in AD 43)

== Recent discoveries ==
In 1984, a strong candidate for a Roman fort was identified at Easter Galcantray, south west of Cawdor, by aerial photography: the Cawdor castrum.

The site was excavated between 1984 and 1988 and several features were identified which are supportive of this classification. Roman pottery similar to the one found in the great Inchtuthill Roman fort has been positively found.

Probably it is one of the most northerly known Roman fort in the British Isles. The possibility that Agricola and his successors reached the northernmost area of Scotland can be confirmed by discoveries north of Inverness. Specifically at Portmahomack and Tarradale in northern Beauly Firth.

Indeed, the Roman legions in the first and second centuries established a chain of very large forts at Ardoch, Strageath, Inchtuthil, Battledykes, Stracathro and Raedykes, taking the Elsick Mounth on the way to Normandykes, before going north to Glenmaillen, Bellie, Balnageith and Cawdor.

Furthermore, there is certainly evidence of an Orcadian connection with Rome prior to AD 60 from pottery found at the Broch of Gurness, while 1st and 2nd century Roman coins have been found at Lingro broch in the Orkney islands.

it would be plausible that Orkney might have been one of those areas that suggest direct administration by Imperial procurators, at least for a very short span of time. Montesanti

Historians like Montesanti in 2010 believe that also in Mine Howe (in the main Orkney island) there it is evidence of a possible Roman presence.

== See also ==
- Timeline of prehistoric Scotland
- Celtic tribes in Britain and Ireland
- Roman client kingdoms in Britain
- Hibernia (ancient Ireland) & Scoti (Irish raiders)
- Prehistoric Orkney
