= Lugi =

People of ancient Britain

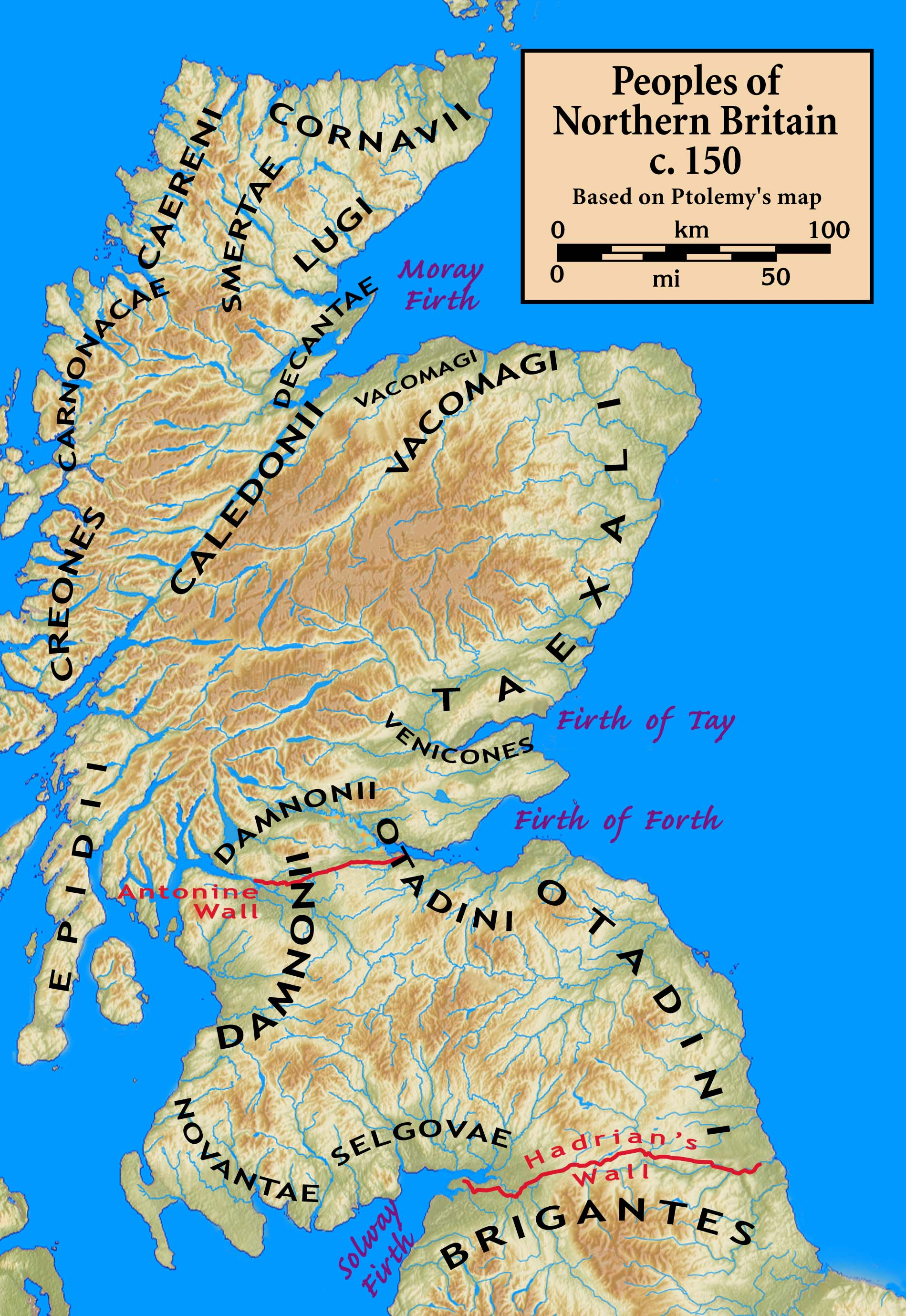

The Lugi were a people of ancient Britain, known only from a single mention of them by the geographer Ptolemy c. 150. from his general description and the approximate locations of their neighbors their territory was along the western coast of the Moray Firth. Ptolemy does not provide them with a town or principal place.

== Etymology ==
The Pictish name Lugi probably stems from Proto-Celtic *lugos ('crow'). A derivation from the Celtic god Lug has also been proposed.

== See also ==
- Lugii
