= Venicones =

Celtic people of ancient Britain

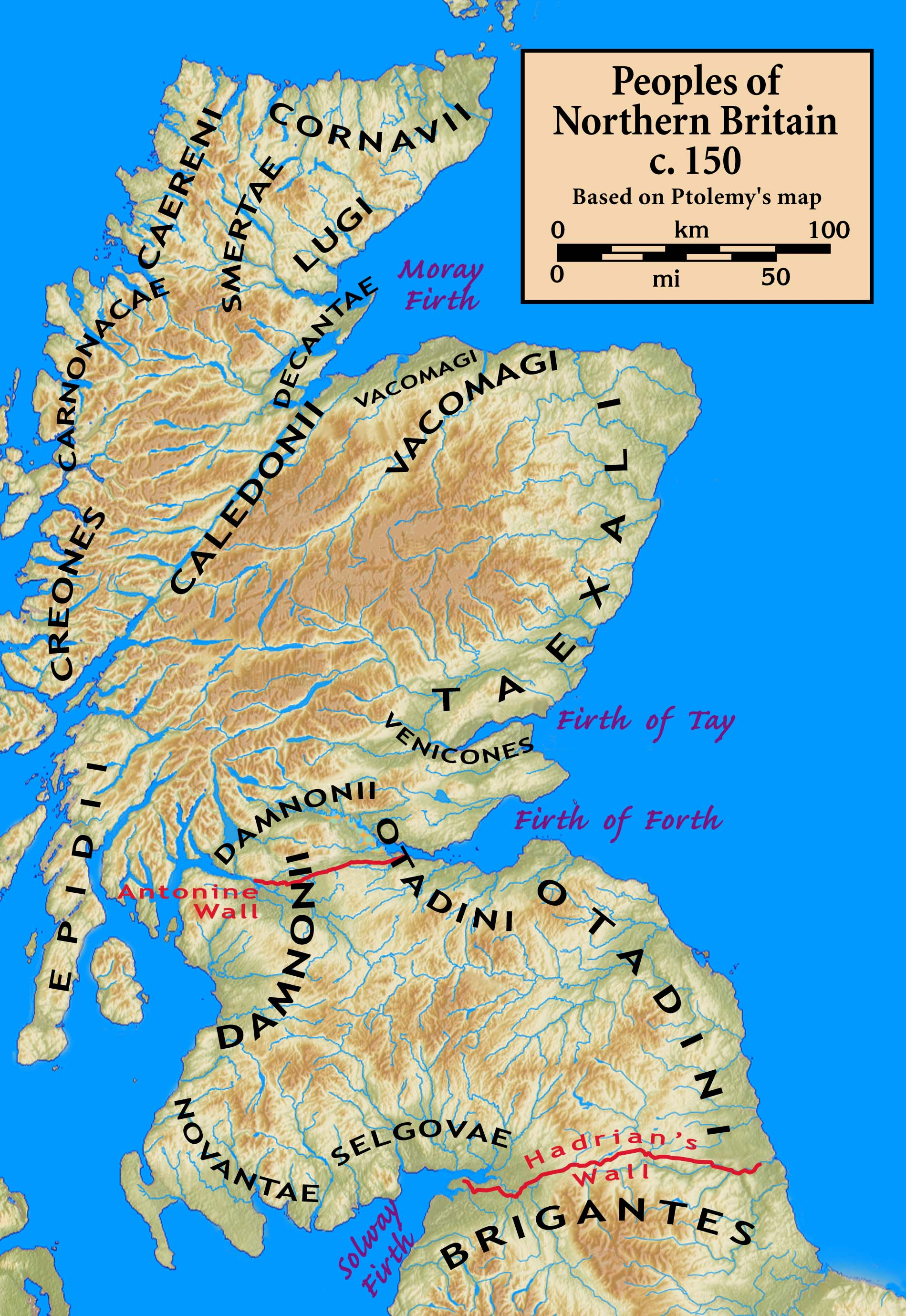

The Venicones were a people of ancient Britain, known only from a single mention of them by the geographer Ptolemy c. 150 AD. He recorded that their town was 'Orrea'. This has been identified as the Roman fort of Horrea Classis, located by Rivet and Smith as Monifieth, six miles east of Dundee. Therefore, they are presumed to have lived between the Tay and the Mounth, south of Aberdeen. Andrew Breeze has suggested that the tribal name probably means "hunting hounds". A slightly differing etymology, "kindred hounds", identifies the name with Maen Gwyngwn, a region mentioned in the Gododdin.
