= Creones =

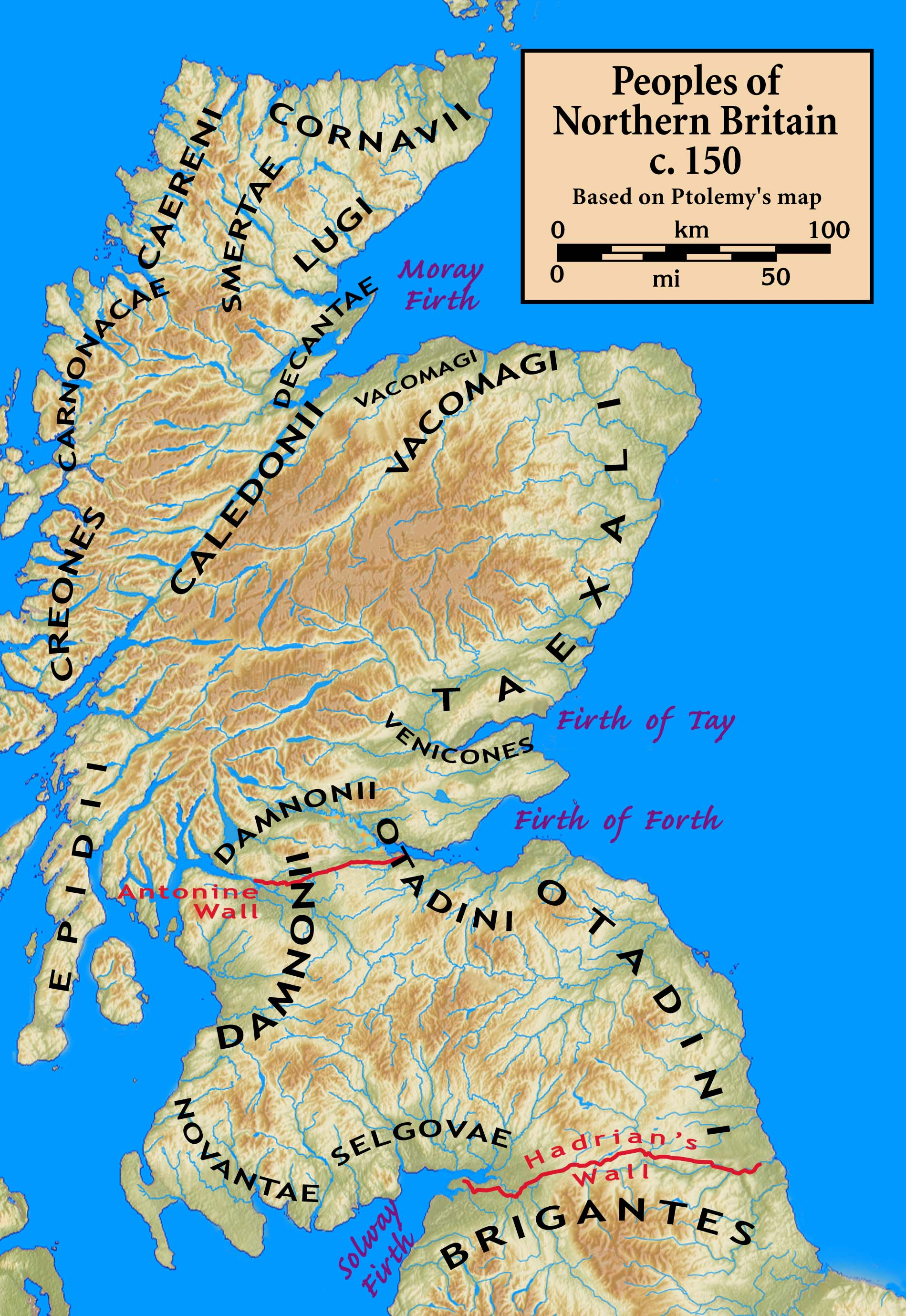

The Creones were a people of ancient Britain, known only from a single mention of them by the geographer Ptolemy c. 150. From his general description and the approximate locations of their neighbors, their territory was along the western coast of Scotland, south of the Isle of Skye and north of the Isle of Mull. Ptolemy does not provide them with a town or principal place.
