= Smertae =

Historical people of ancient Britain

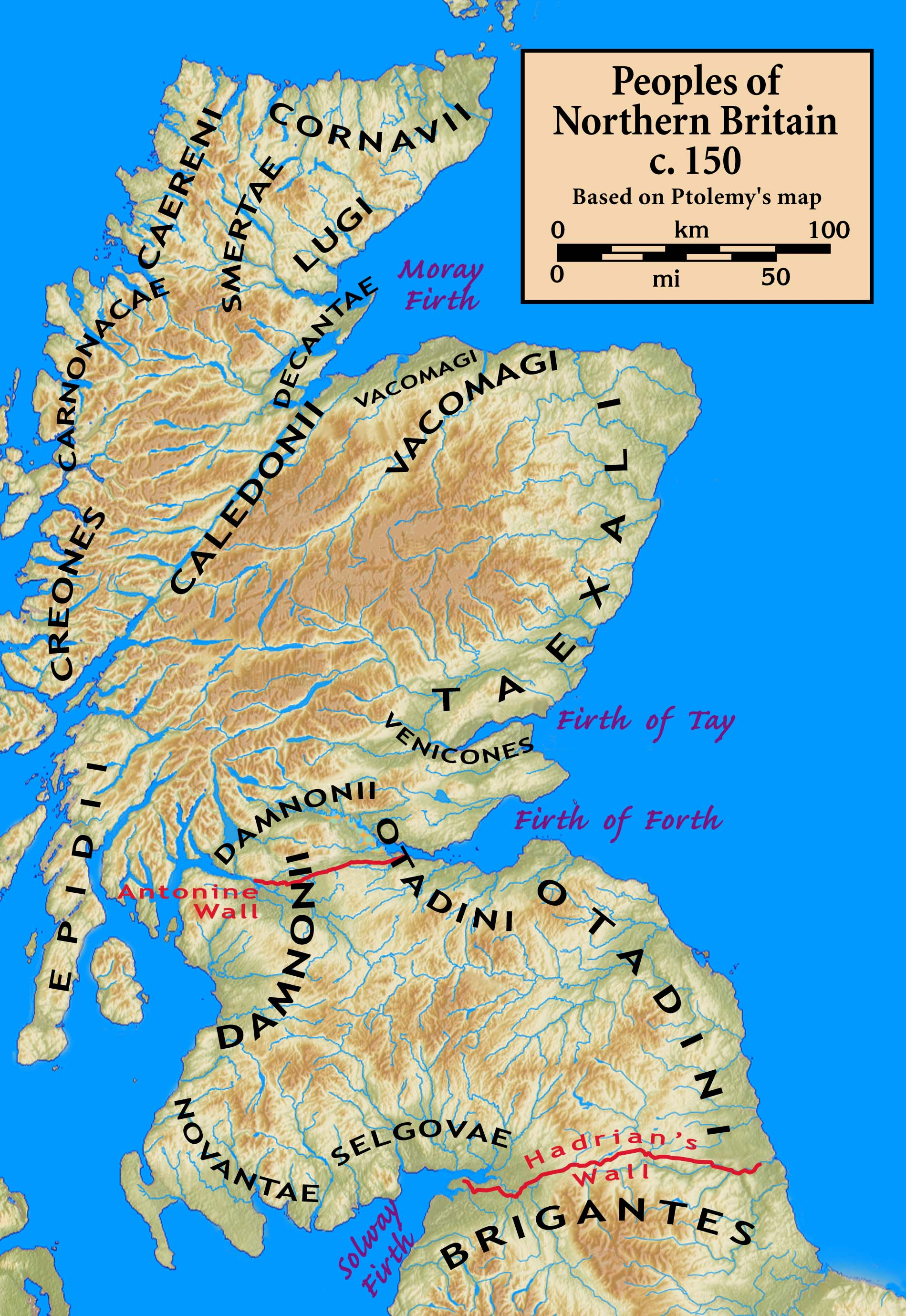

The Smertae were a people of ancient Britain, known only from a single mention of them by the geographer Ptolemy c. 150. From his general description and the approximate locations of their neighbors, their territory was in the modern area of central Sutherland. Ptolemy does not provide them with a town or principal place.

== History ==
Their name is commemorated by Càrn Smeart, an ancient burial mound on the ridge between the rivers Carron and Oykel.

The etymology of the name Smertae is not known for certain. However, entry 1794 of the Indogermanisches etymologisches Wörterbuch maintains that the element *smert- is present in Welsh verb darmerth (*do-ɸare-smertā-) meaning ‘purvey’ (i.e. 'provide') and noun armerth (*ɸare-smertā-s) ‘provision’ as well as in Old Irish airmert (*ɸare-smerto-m) ‘preparation’, glossing *smert- as 'provide for, purvey'.
