= Carnonacae =

People of ancient Britain

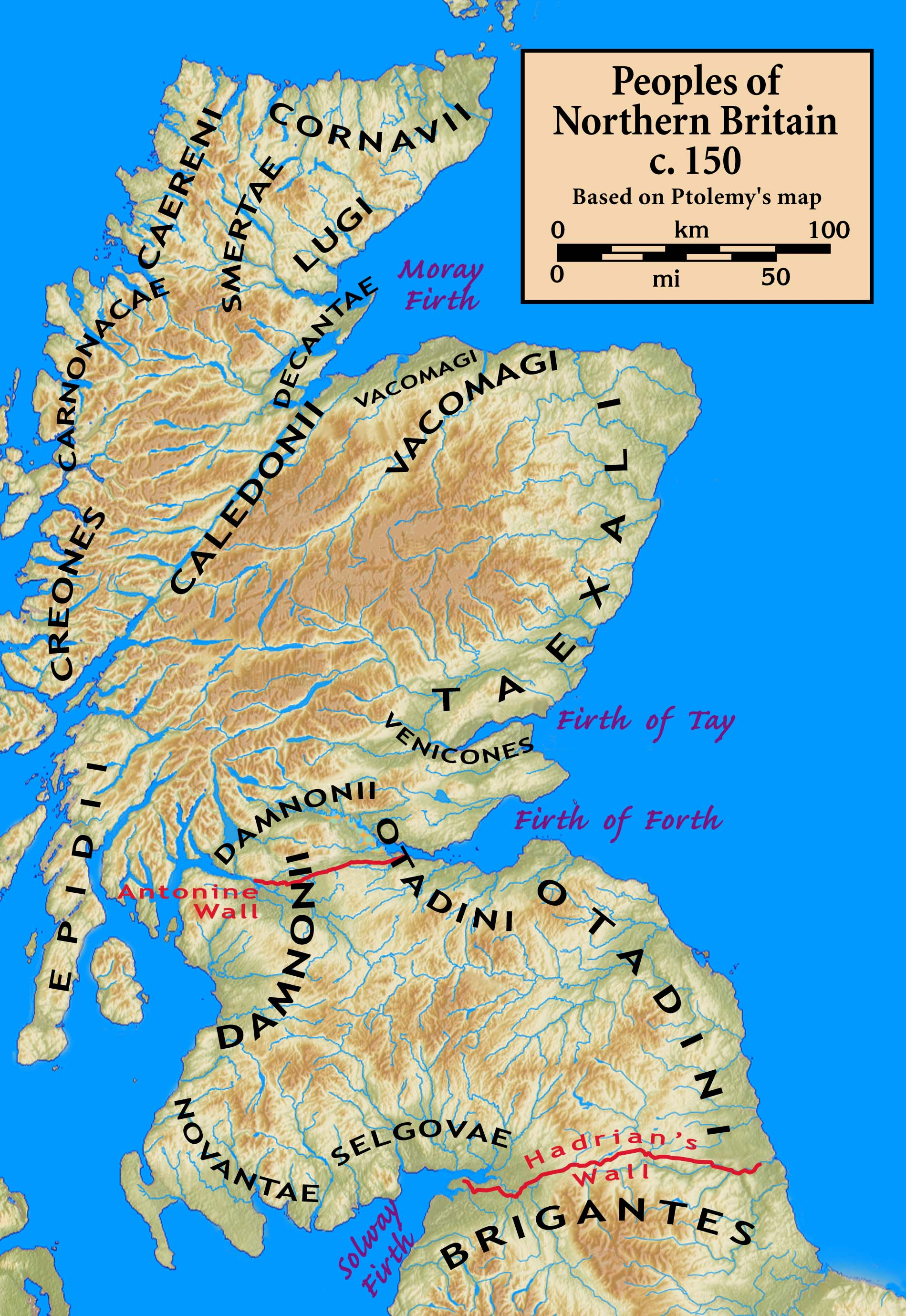

The Carnonacae were a people of ancient Britain, known only from a single mention of them by the geographer Ptolemy around the year 150. From his general description and the approximate locations of their neighbours, their territory was most likely along the western coast of current-day Ross-shire in northern Scotland. Ptolemy did not name a town or principal place associated with them.
