= Epidii =

Ancient British tribe

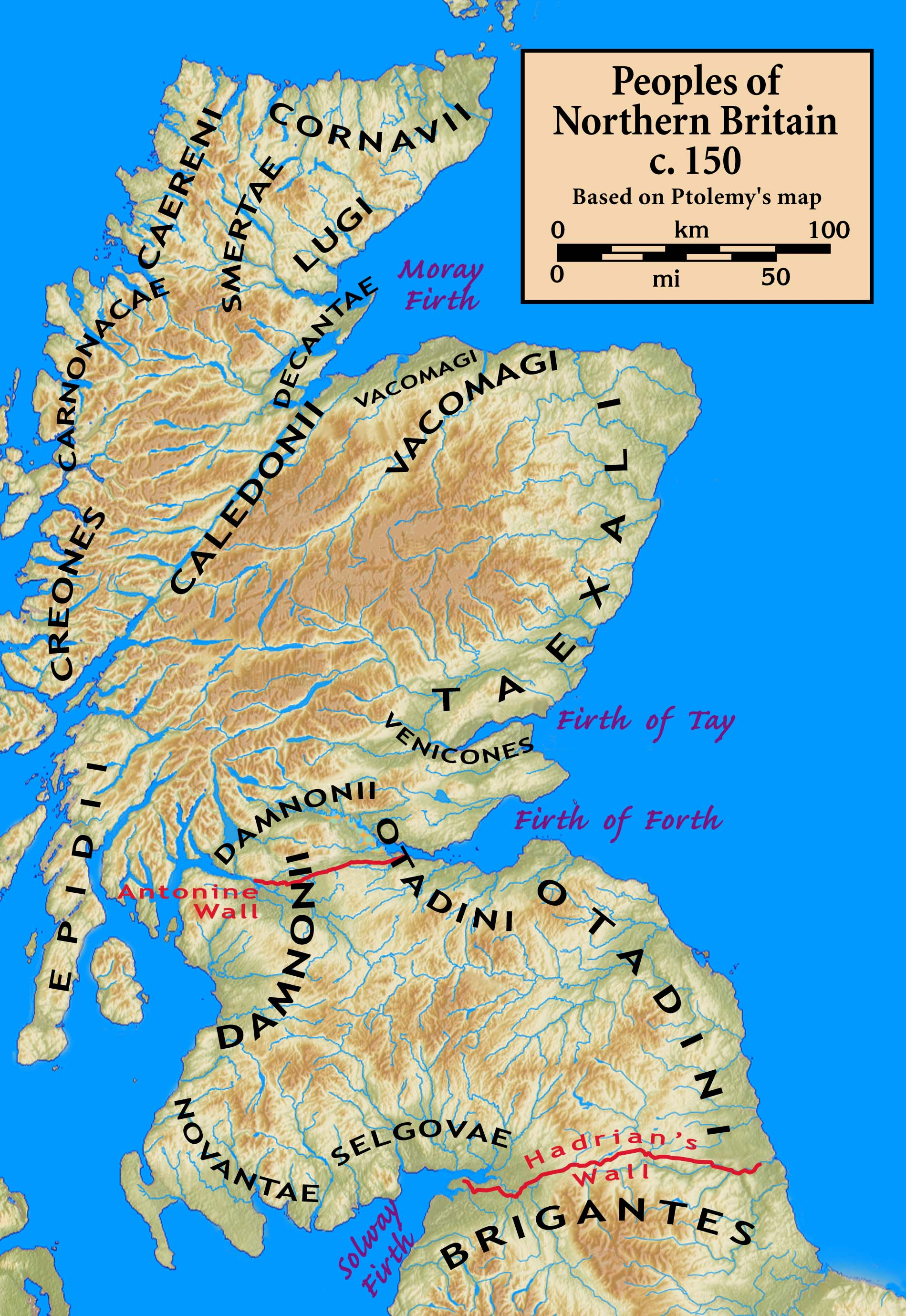
Peoples of Northern Britain according to Ptolemy's map

The Epidii (Greek: Επίδιοι) were a people of ancient Britain, known from a mention of them by the geographer Ptolemy c. 150. Epidion has been identified as the island of Islay in modern Argyll. Ptolemy does not list a town for the Epidii, but the Ravenna Cosmography (RC 108.4) mentions Rauatonium, which is assumed to be Southend.

== Etymology ==
The name Epidii includes the P-Celtic root epos, meaning "horse" (cf. Welsh ebol, "a foal"). The Q-Celtic equivalent would be *ekwos, which became Old Gaelic ech. It is suggested that they were named after a horse god, whose name could be reconstructed as *Epidios. The Q-Celtic equivalent would be *Ekwidios, which may be the origin of the Old Gaelic name Eochaid.

The Dagda, a Gaelic god, is often referred to as Eochaid Ollathair.

== Language ==
Although their name is almost certainly Brittonic/P-Celtic, Dr Ewan Campbell suggest they were Goidelic/Q-Celtic speakers. He says "Ptolemy's source for his Scottish names was probably from the Scottish Central Lowlands, and may have transmitted the Brittonic form of a Goidelic tribal name, or even the external name given to the tribe by Brittonic speakers". Their territory later became the heartland of the Goidelic kingdom of Dál Riata. Alex Woolf suggests that the Epidii became the Dál Riata, but argues that they were Brittonic-speaking in Ptolemy's time. He also suggests that the Hebrides, called the Ebudae by Ptolemy, were named after the Epidii.

== See also ==
- Britons (historic)
- Picts
- Scottish people
- Dál Riata

== Sources ==
- Armit, Ian, Celtic Scotland, (2nd ed.) London: B.T. Batsford/Historic Scotland, 2005. ISBN 0-7134-8949-9
- Campbell, Ewan (2001). "Were the Scots Irish?". Antiquity. 75 (288): 285–292. doi:10.1017/S0003598X00060920. S2CID 159844564.
- Delamarre, X. (2003). Dictionnaire de la langue gauloise : une approche linguistique du vieux-celtique continental (2nd ed.). Paris: Errance. ISBN 2-87772-237-6.
- Fitzpatrick-Matthews, Keith (5 August 2013) "Britannia in the Ravenna Cosmography: a reassessment." (pdf) Academia.edu. Retrieved 23 January 2015.
- Foster, Sally M., Picts, Gaels, and Scots (2nd ed.) London: B.T. Batsford/Historic Scotland, 2005. ISBN 0-7134-8874-3
- Ptolemy (150), Thayer, Bill (ed.), Geographia, Book 2, Chapter 2: Albion island of Britannia, LacusCurtius website at the University of Chicago (published 2008)
- The British Section of the Ravenna Cosmography in Archaeologia 93 (1949), 108.4
- Watson, W. J. (2004) The Celtic Place-Names of Scotland. Edinburgh. Birlinn. ISBN 1-84158-323-5. First published 1926.
