= Vadicassii =

Gallic tribe

The Vadicassii (Ancient Greek: Ou̓adikássioi, Οὐαδικάσσιοι) were an ancient Gallic tribe of the Roman period, located near the Meldi (Meaux), on the frontier between Gallia Celtica and Gallia Belgica.

== Name ==
The tribe is only mentioned once as Ou̓adikássioi (Οὐαδικάσσιοι) by Ptolemy in the 2nd century AD.

They have sometimes been conflated with the Bodiocasses (located around modern Bayeux) and with the Veliocasses (around modern Rouen), although the geographical indications given by Ptolemy do not match.

The modern region of Valois, attested as Pagus vadensis in 796 AD (later Pago vadense in 842, Pagus vadisus in 853), and the town of Vez, attested as Vadum ca. 866, are probably named after the tribe.

== Geography ==
Ptolemy places the tribe near the Meldi (Meaux), on the borders of Gallia Belgica.

North of the Meldi lay the Carolingian-era Pagus vadisus (with its capital Vadum, now Vez), whose name closely resembles that of the Vadicassii. This area, situated between the Meldi and the Suessiones, corresponds to modern Valois, a territory that partially overlaps (or predates) the domain of the Silvanectes.

Ptolemy gives Noiomagos as their capital. No ancient toponym in the region clearly matches that name, apart from Nogeon (in Réez-Fosse-Martin within Valois), though references to Nogeon date only from the 18th century.

== See also ==
- Gaul
- List of peoples of Gaul
- List of Celtic tribes
