= Sucasses =

Ancient Gallic tribe of Aquitania

The Sucasses (also Succasses) were an ancient Gallic tribe living in Gallia Aquitania during the Roman period.

== Name ==
They are mentioned only by Pliny (1st c. AD), who records them as Succasses (var. Sucassae, Suçasse, Vocassae) in his list of the peoples of Aquitania. They are not named by any other ancient author.

The ethnonym Sucasses is a Gaulish compound formed with the prefix su- ('good, well'). The meaning of the second element -casses, also attested in other Gaulish ethnonyms such as Bodiocasses, Durocasses, Tricasses, Veliocasses and Viducasses, has been debated. It has traditionally been taken to signify '(curly) hair, hairstyle' (cf. Old Irish chass 'curl'), perhaps referring to a particular warrior coiffure, in which case Sucasses is rendered as 'those with the beautiful curls'.

Patrizia de Bernardo Stempel has instead interpreted the -casses ethnonyms as references to helmets, rendering Sucasses as 'those with the good (i.e. harder) helmets' and taking such names as evidence that the metalworking era had already begun. In a study of the ancient tin routes, Mélanie Mairecolas and Jean-Marie Pailler connect the element cass- with 'tin' rather than with 'hair' (cf. Gaulish Cassi-dannos, 'magistrate in charge of bronze coins', Britt. Cassivellaunus, 'Chief-of-Tin'; also Greek κασσίτερος 'tin'), and translate the name as 'those with the fine tin' or 'strong through tin'.

== Geography ==
Pliny lists the Sucasses among the peoples of Gallia Aquitania, in the group that he places on the interior plateaus and plains, between the Oscidates Campestres and the Lactorates. Their exact location is unknown. Paul-Marie Duval, who counts them among the peoples Pliny was unable to situate precisely, places them conjecturally on the lower or middle Garonne. Mairecolas and Pailler locate them near the Garonne and interpret their chief town as a staging post on a tin route crossing the Gaulish isthmus between the Atlantic and the Mediterranean.
