= Viducasses =

Gallic tribe

The Viducassēs (Gaulish: *Uiducassēs) were a Gallic tribe dwelling in the modern Calvados department during the Iron Age and the Roman period.

== Name ==
They are mentioned as Viducasses by Pliny (1st c. AD), and as Bidoukesíōn (Βιδουκεσίων; var. Βιδουκασίων, Βιδουκαίσιων) and Bidoukésioi (Βιδουκέσιοι; var. Οὐιδουκαίσιοι, Οὐιδουκέσιοι) by Ptolemy (2nd c. AD).

The Gaulish ethnonym derives from the stem *uidu- ('tree, wood'). The meaning of the second element -casses, attested in other Gaulish ethnonyms such as Bodiocasses, Durocasses, Sucasses, Tricasses, or Veliocasses, has been debated. It has traditionally been interpreted as '(curly) hair, hairstyle' (cf. Old Irish chass 'curl'), perhaps referring to a particular warrior coiffure. On this reading the name has been translated as 'the tangled-hair ones', that is to say 'those with the hair tangled like a tree'.

Other scholars have instead connected the element with metalworking. Patrizia de Bernardo Stempel interprets the -casses ethnonyms as helmet-names, glossing Viducasses as 'those with wooden helmets' and treating such names as evidence that the metalworking era had begun. Mélanie Mairecolas and Jean-Marie Pailler, who link cass- to tin rather than to hair (cf. Gaulish Cassi-dannos, 'magistrate in charge of bronze coins', Britt. Cassivellaunus, 'Chief-of-Tin'; also Greek κασσίτερος 'tin'), prefer 'those of wood-and-tin' or 'the men whose tin is worked with wood', relating the name to the joint activity of carpenters and bronze-workers, though they concede the formation is not entirely clear.

The city of Vieux, attested in the 3rd century AD as Civitas Viducassium ('civitas of the Viducasses'; Veiocae in 1180, Vieux in 1294), is named after the Gallic tribe.

== Geography ==
Northwestern Gaul

The Viducasses dwelled south of the Bodiocasses, north of the Aulerci Diablintes, southeast of the Venelli, northeast of the Abrincatui, west of the Lexovii, and northwest of the Sagii.

During the Roman period, their chief town was known as Aregenua ('by the Guigne river'; modern Vieux), whose area roughly corresponded to the plain of Caen. The city grew from the first half of the 2nd century and reached its height during the Severan period (193–235). In an inscription dated to 238 AD, the settlement is called both a 'free city' and a 'colony'. In the 3rd century, Aregenua became Civitas Viducassium, although it was probably absorbed by the civitas of the Bodiocasses in the early 4th century, for the Civitas Viducassium is not mentioned in the Notitia Dignitatum and the Notitia Galliarum.

== Religion ==
A sanctuary from the end of the 1st century BC is known at Baron-sur-Odon, 2.5km west of Aregenua.
