= Bodiocasses =

Gallic tribe

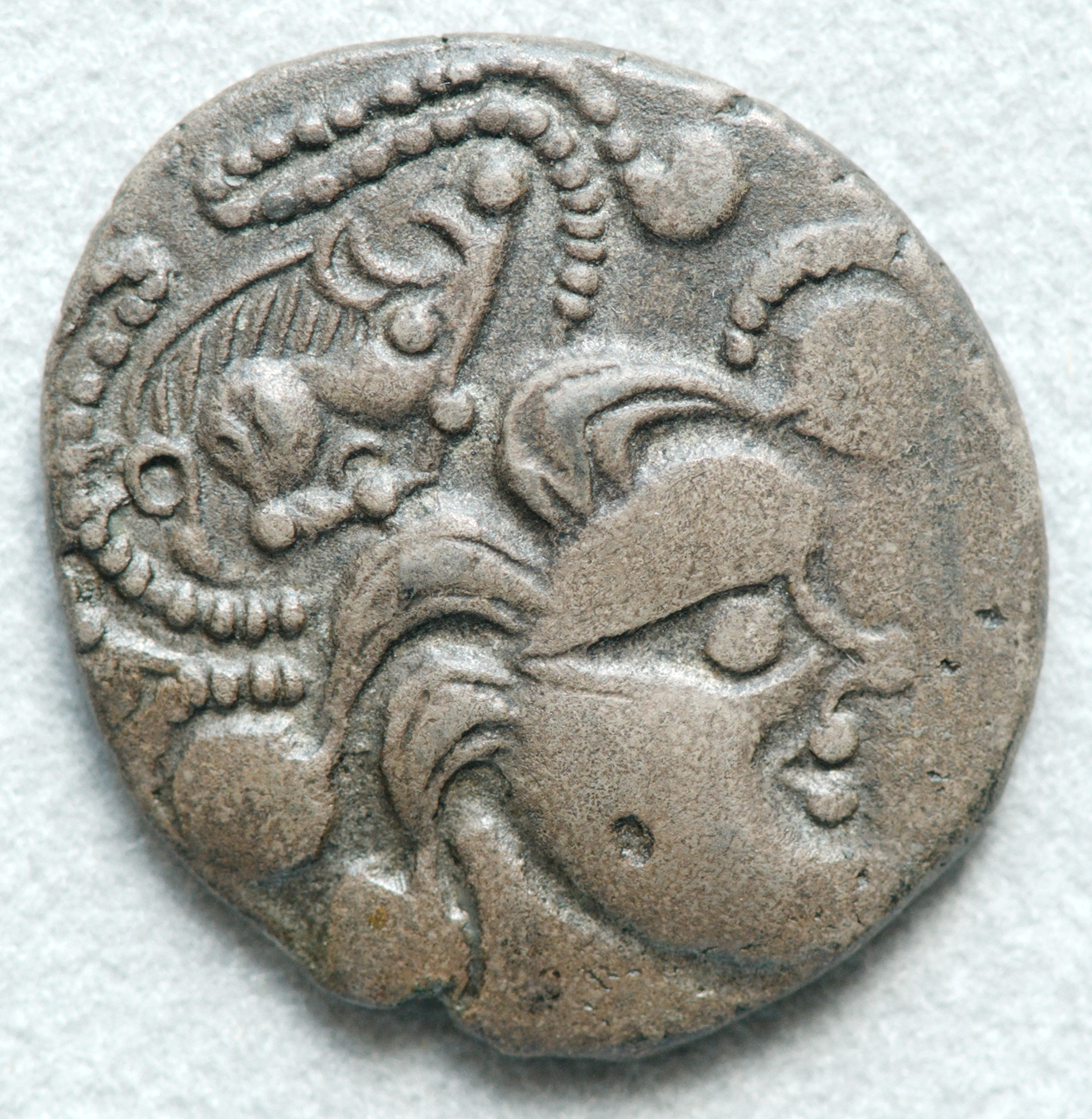
A stater of the Baiocasses depicting a human profile with a boar set within whirls of pattern that extend from the stylized hair. The Celtic war locks are clearly represented and could justify the etymology Bodio-cassi

The Bodiocasses or Baiocasses were an ancient Gallic tribe of the Roman period. They were a tribal division of the civitas of the Lexovii, in the Roman province of Gallia Lugdunensis.

== Name ==
=== Attestations ===
They are mentioned as Bodiocasses by Pliny (1st c. AD), as Baiocassi by Ausonius (4th c. AD), and as Baiocas in the Notitia Dignitatum (5th c. AD).

In Pliny's Natural History, various manuscripts refer to this tribe as the Vadiocasses, Bodiocasses, or Bodicasses, likely due to a copyist’s mistake.

The Vadicassii (Οὐαδικάσσιοι) cited by Ptolemy in the 2nd century AD are probably a separate tribe, since he places them near the Meldi (Meaux), in the direction of Belgica.

=== Etymology ===
The Gaulish ethnonym Bodiocasses derives from the Proto-Celtic stem *bodyo- ('yellow, blond'; cf. Old Irish buide 'yellow'). The meaning of the second element -casses, attested in other Gaulish ethnonyms such as Durocasses, Sucasses, Tricasses, Veliocasses or Viducasses, has been debated. It has traditionally been interpreted as '(curly) hair, hairstyle' (cf. Old Irish chass 'curl'), perhaps referring to a particular warrior coiffure. On this reading Rudolf Thurneysen compared the name with Old Irish buide-chass ('blond curls') and translated Bodiocasses as 'those who have blond curls/braids'.

Other scholars have instead connected the element with metalworking. Patrizia de Bernardo Stempel interprets the -casses ethnonyms as helmet-names, glossing Bodiocasses as 'those with the shiny (i.e. bronze) helmets' and treating such names as evidence that the metalworking era had begun. Mélanie Mairecolas and Jean-Marie Pailler, who link cass- to 'tin' rather than to 'hair' (cf. Gaulish Cassi-dannos, 'magistrate in charge of bronze coins', Britt. Cassivellaunus, 'Chief-of-Tin'; also Greek κασσίτερος 'tin'), propose instead 'those with the bright, tawny-gleaming metal (tin or bronze)' or, less probably, 'those made bright by the metal'.

The city of Bayeux, attested ca. 400 AD as civitas Baiocassium ('civitas of the Baiocasses'; Baiocas in 400–410, Baieus in 1155), and the region of Bessin, attested in 840 AD as pagus Baiocassinus ('pagus of the Baiocasses'; Beissin in 1050–66), all stem from the Gallic tribe.

== Geography ==
The Baiocasses dwelled in a region located around modern-day Bayeux in western Normandy.

== History ==
Julius Caesar does not mention the tribe in his commentaries on the Gallic Wars (58–50 BCE), but they are later mentioned by Ausonius (4th c. AD) and in the Notitia Dignitatum (5th c. AD). They are probably the same people Pliny calls Bodiocasses.

The Baiocasses minted base gold, silver and billon (base silver) coins in the denomination of one stater and in the case of gold coins sometimes quarter staters. Most of the coins show a Celtic-style male head with elaborated hair on the obverse, and on the reverse a horse with a chariot rider above or behind, and below usually either a lyre or small boar. A number of these are in existence.

The 4th-century Bordelaise poet Ausonius teases a friend as a Baiocassis who claimed to be of druidic heritage and descended from priests of Belenus.

== See also ==
- Gaul
- List of peoples of Gaul
- List of Celtic tribes
