= Tricasses =

Gallic tribe

The Tricasses were a Gallic tribe dwelling on the upper Seine and the Aube rivers during the Roman period.

== Name ==
They are mentioned as Tricasses by Pliny (1st c. AD), and as Trikásioi (Τρικάσιοι) by Ptolemy (2nd c. AD).

The Gaulish ethnonym Tricasses is traditionally derived from the root for 'three', tri-. The meaning of the second element -casses, attested in other Gaulish ethnonyms such as Bodiocasses, Durocasses, Sucasses, Veliocasses or Viducasses, has been debated. It has often been interpreted as '(curly) hair, hairstyle' (cf. Old Irish chass 'curl'), perhaps referring to a particular warrior coiffure. On this reading the name has been translated as 'the three-braided ones' or 'those of the three (many) curls'.

Mélanie Mairecolas and Jean-Marie Pailler have proposed a different analysis, instead interpreting -casses as 'tin' (cf. Gaulish Cassi-dannos, 'magistrate in charge of bronze coins', Britt. Cassivellaunus, 'Chief-of-Tin'; also Greek κασσίτερος 'tin'). Rejecting both the 'three curls' reading and a literal 'three strands of metal', they take tri- not as 'three' but in the sense 'across, through' (Gaulish trē- < *trei-; cf. Latin trans), giving Tricasses the meaning 'the conveyors of tin', on the model of the Treveri ('the ferrymen'). They connect this with the position of the people at the highest navigable point of the Seine on a tin route, and with the linguistically older form Tricastini of the Rhône valley.

The city of Troyes, attested ca. 400 AD as civitas Tricassium ('civitas of the Tricasses'; Trecassis in the 7th c., Treci in 890, Troies in 1230), is named after the Gallic tribe.

== Geography ==
The Tricasses dwelled near the Senones, the Parisii, the Meldi, the Remi and the Lingones.

Until the first century AD, they were probably reckoned among the Senones.

From the reign of Augustus, Augustobona Tricassium (modern Troyes) was the chief town of their civitas.
