= Veliocasses =

Belgic-Gallic tribe

The Veliocasses or Velocasses (Gaulish: *Ueliocassēs) were a Belgic or Gallic tribe of the La Tène and Roman periods, dwelling in the south of modern Seine-Maritime and in the north of Eure.

== Name ==
They are mentioned as Veliocasses by Caesar (mid-1st c. BC) and Pliny (1st c. AD), as Ou̓éliokásioi (Οὐέλιοκάσιοι; var. οὐενελιοάσιοι) by Ptolemy (2nd c. AD), and as Velocasses by Orosius (early 5th c. AD).

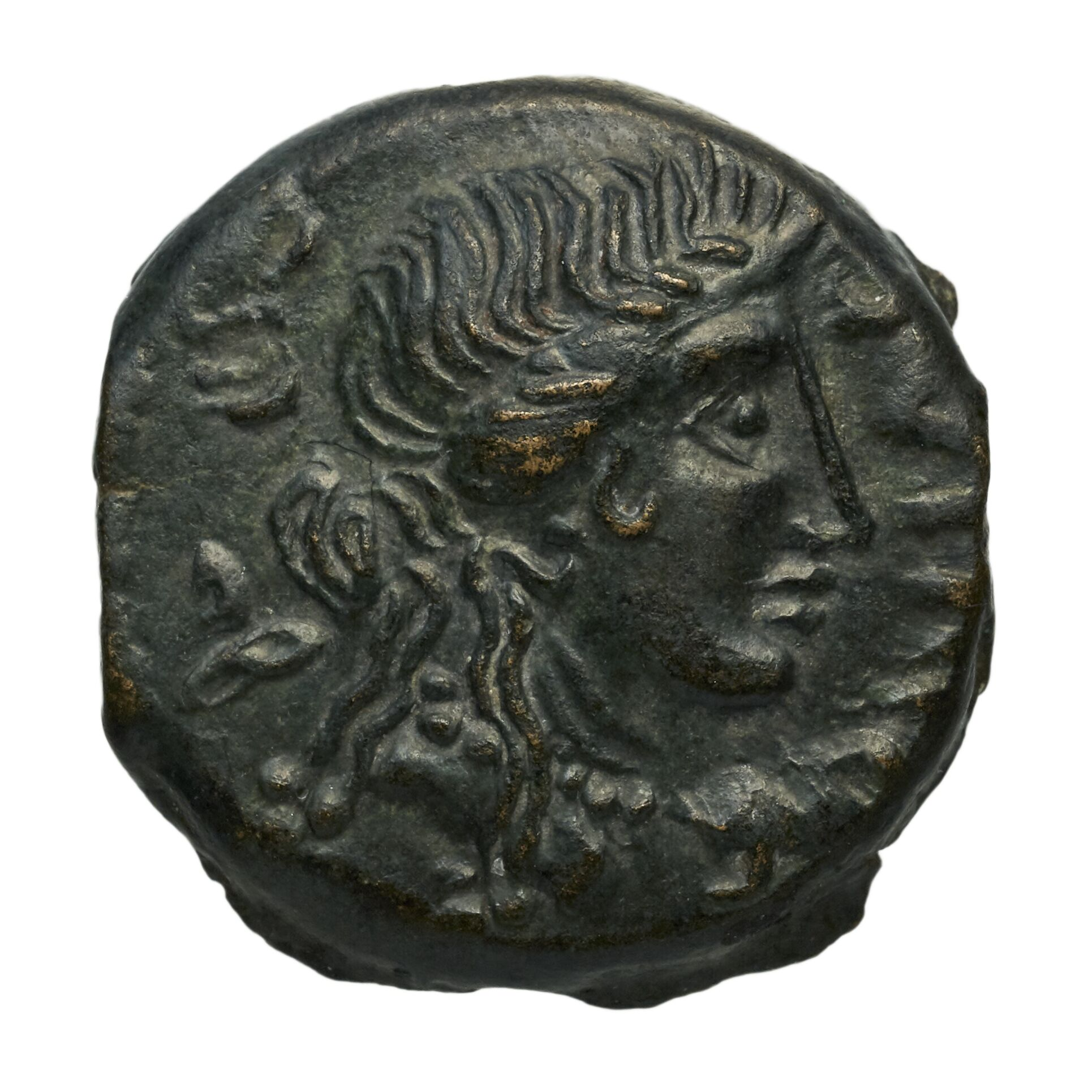
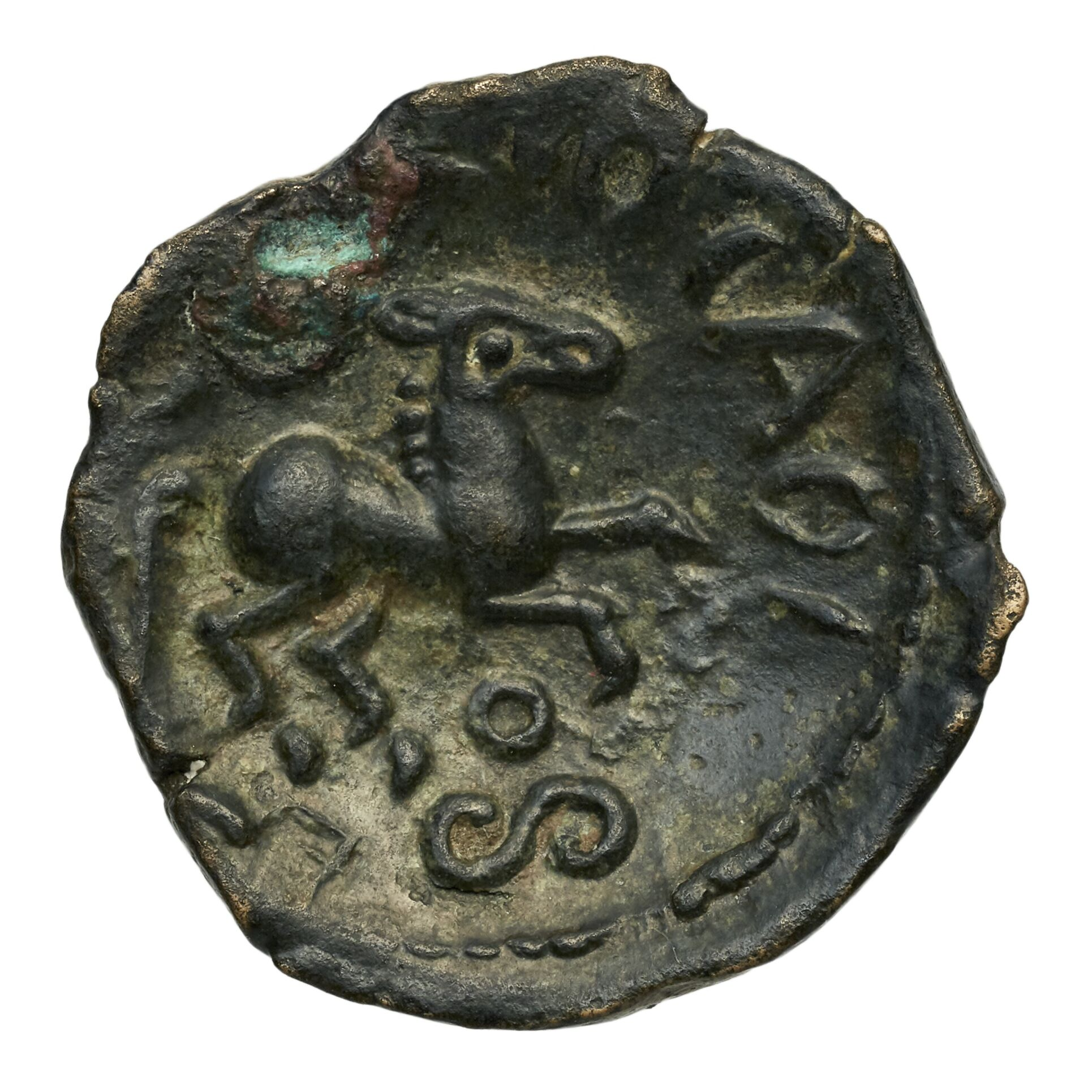
Bronze coin of the Veliocasses. "Venus" head type on the obverse with a legend likely to be a personal name, Suticcos; on the reverse, a horse with the legend VELIOCAΘI

The meaning of the Gaulish ethnonym is uncertain. The first part is certainly the Gaulish stem uelio-, which could either derive from Proto-Celtic *wēliyā- ('modesty'; cf. OIr. féle, OBret. guiled 'honestas'), or else from Proto-Celtic *wēlyo- ('better'; cf. Welsh gwell 'better'). The second etymology is semantically more probable for a tribal name, but the unknown length of the vowel e in uelio- makes it difficult to conclude with certainty.

The meaning of the second element -casses, attested in other Gaulish ethnonyms such as Bodiocasses, Durocasses, Sucasses, Tricasses, or Viducasses, has been debated. It has traditionally been interpreted as '(curly) hair, hairstyle' (cf. Old Irish chass 'curl'), perhaps referring to a particular warrior coiffure. On this reading Veliocasses has been rendered as 'the curly ones', or 'those with very curly hair'.

Other scholars have instead connected the element with metalworking. Patrizia de Bernardo Stempel interprets the -casses ethnonyms as helmet-names, glossing Veliocasses as 'those with the good (i.e. harder) helmets' and treating such names as evidence that the metalworking era had begun. Mélanie Mairecolas and Jean-Marie Pailler, who link cass- to 'tin' rather than to 'hair' (cf. Gaulish Cassi-dannos, 'magistrate in charge of bronze coins', Britt. Cassivellaunus, 'Chief-of-Tin'; also Greek κασσίτερος 'tin'), propose instead 'those with the better metal', 'better through the metal', or 'those with the metal of a chief'.

The county of Vexin, attested in 617 as pagus Veliocassinus ('pagus of the Veliocasses'; Vilcassinum in 1092, Vulesin in 1118), is named after the ancient tribe.

== Geography ==
The territory of the Veliocasses lay between the Parisii, the Caletes, and the Bellovaci, primarily north of the lower course of the Sequana (Seine), and to a limited extent also south of the river. Wooded highlands formed a natural boundary with the Bellovaci, who held sway in that region. The Sequana also separated them from the Lexovii and the Aulerci Eburovices.

During the pre-Roman period, their capital was probably the oppidum of Camp de Calidou (near Caudebec), then Rotomagus (present-day Rouen) after the reign of Augustus (27 BC–14 AD). In the 2nd century AD, the settlement served as a significant harbor for exports bound for Britain.

== History ==
In 57 BC, during the Gallic Wars, they supplied ten thousand men to the army of the coalition of Belgic peoples led by the Bellovaci, but in 52 BC they sent only three thousand men to the army of the Gallic coalition. They again took part the following year in the mobilization of the chiefs Correos and Commios.

== Culture ==
As for the neighbouring Calates, whether the Veliocasses should be classified as Gallic or Belgic is debatable.

== Primary sources ==
- Caesar (1917). The Gallic War. Loeb Classical Library. Translated by Edwards, H. J. Harvard University Press. ISBN 978-0-674-99080-7.
- Pliny (1938). Natural History. Loeb Classical Library. Translated by Rackham, H. Harvard University Press. ISBN 9780674993648.

=== Bibliography ===
- Busse, Peter E. (2006). "Belgae". In Koch, John T. (ed.). Celtic Culture: A Historical Encyclopedia. ABC-CLIO. pp. 195–200. ISBN 978-1-85109-440-0.
- de Bernardo Stempel, Patrizia (2008). "Linguistically Celtic Ethnonyms: Towards a Classification". In García Alonso, Juan Luis (ed.). Celtic and Other Languages in Ancient Europe. Salamanca: Ediciones Universidad de Salamanca. pp. 101–118.
- de Bernardo Stempel, Patrizia (2015). "Zu den keltisch benannten Stämmen im Umfeld des oberen Donauraums". In Lohner-Urban, Ute; Scherrer, Peter (eds.). Der obere Donauraum 50 v. bis 50 n. Chr. Frank & Timme. ISBN 978-3-7329-0143-2.
- Delamarre, Xavier (2003). Dictionnaire de la langue gauloise: Une approche linguistique du vieux-celtique continental. Errance. ISBN 9782877723695.
- Falileyev, Alexander (2010). Dictionary of Continental Celtic Place-names: A Celtic Companion to the Barrington Atlas of the Greek and Roman World. CMCS. ISBN 978-0955718236.
- Kruta, Venceslas (2000). Les Celtes, histoire et dictionnaire. Robert Laffont. ISBN 2-221-05690-6.
- Mairecolas, Mélanie; Pailler, Jean-Marie (2010). "Sur les « voies de l'étain » dans l'ancien Occident. Quelques jalons". Pallas. 82: 139–167. doi:10.4000/pallas.12254.
- Matasović, Ranko (2009). Etymological Dictionary of Proto-Celtic. Brill. ISBN 9789004173361.
- Polfer, Michel (2006). "Veliocasses". Brill's New Pauly. doi:10.1163/1574-9347_bnp_e1229330.
- Roblin, Michel (1976). "Petromanlalum, Saint-Clair et le Vexin". Journal des Savants. 1 (1): 3–31. doi:10.3406/jds.1976.1332.
- Wightman, Edith M. (1985). Gallia Belgica. University of California Press. ISBN 978-0-520-05297-0.
