= Lexovii =

Gallic tribe

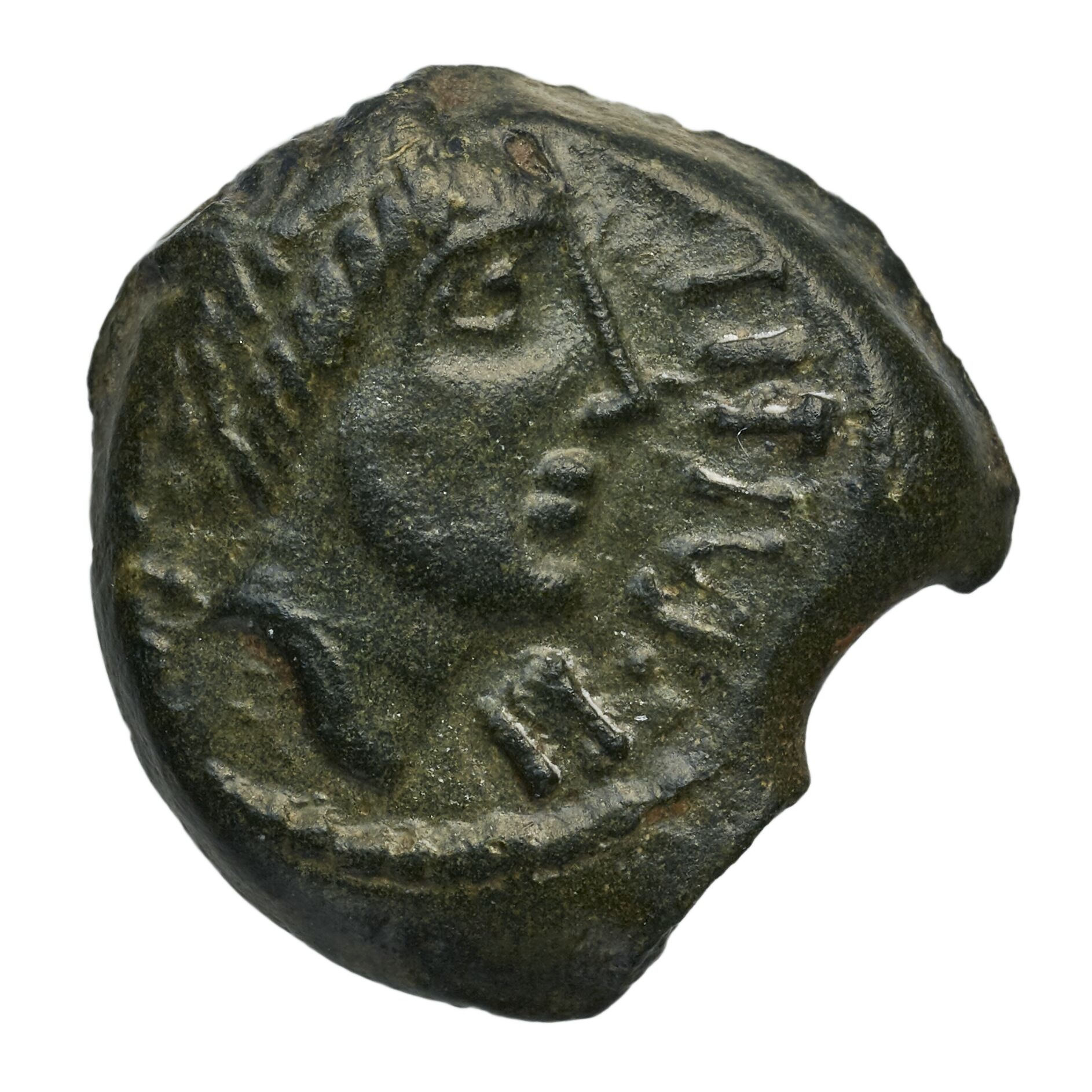
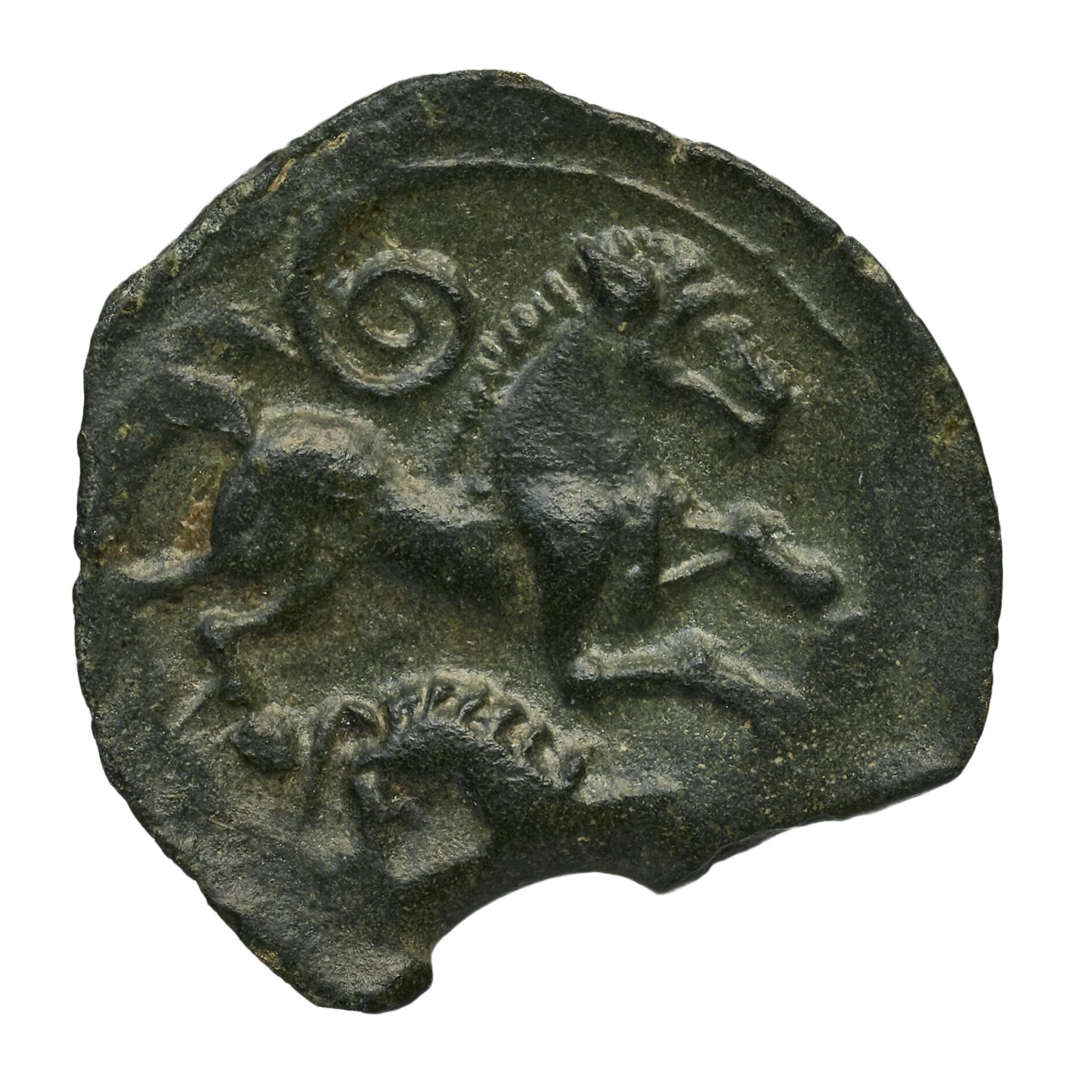
Bronze coin of the Lexovii with the legend LIXOVIATIS on the obverse and a galloping horse over a boar on the reverse

The Lexovii (Gaulish: *Lexsouioi, 'the leaning ones', possibly 'the lame') were a Gallic people who lived on the Channel coast, west of the mouth of the Seine, during the Iron Age and the Roman period. Their name survives in that of Lisieux, the capital of their civitas, and in the Lieuvin region. They took part in the Gallic Wars, and after the conquest they struck an unusual civic coinage in bronze, the only one of its kind known in Gaul.

== Name ==
They are mentioned as Lexovii (variant Lexobii) and Lexovios by Caesar (mid-1st century BC), as Lēxobíous (Ληξοβίους) and Lēxooúioi (Ληξοούιοι) by Strabo (early 1st century AD), as Lexovios (variants lexobios, lixouios) by Pliny (1st century AD), and as Lēxoubíōn (Ληξουβίων, variant Λειξουβίων) and Lēxoúbioi (Ληξούβιοι, variant Λιξούβιοι) by Ptolemy (2nd century AD).

The ethnonym Lexovii is a Latinized form of the Gaulish Lexsouioi (singular Lexsouios), interpreted as 'the leaning ones', possibly 'the lame', a derivative of the adjective leksu- ('oblique'; cf. Old Irish losc 'lame' and Welsh llesg 'feeble', 'crippled'). An exact parallel has been highlighted in the Welsh llechwedd ('slope'), from an earlier *lexsouíiā. (Note: Peter Schrijver instead derived the Welsh comparandum from llech ('slate') and gwedd ('appearance', 'face'), a reading Delamarre rejects.) Xavier Delamarre takes Lexovii to be an exonym, a nickname given to the people by their neighbours, on the ground that a people would not call itself 'the lame'. Bernard Sergent has questioned this. He notes that most Gaulish ethnonyms are generally self-designations, and that lameness carried positive associations in Celtic and wider Indo-European tradition, linked to royal and warrior figures, so that 'the lame' could as easily be a self-designation.

The city of Lisieux, attested ca. 400 AD as civitas Lexoviorum ('civitas of the Lexovii', Loxovias in 614, Lisiue in 1024), and the region of Lieuvin, attested in the 6th c. as Luxoviensis (pagus Lisvinus in 802, Liévin in 1155), are named after the Gallic tribe.

== Geography ==
The Lexovii held a territory that corresponds broadly to the eastern part of modern Normandy and marked the eastern edge of Armorican Gaul. It is usually reconstructed from the medieval diocese of Lisieux, on the principle, set out by Olivier Buchsenschutz and others, that the diocesan boundaries preserved those of the pre-Roman civitas. Hubert Lepaumier notes that this equation is not secure.

The frontiers themselves remain hypothetical. Raoul Doranlo proposed a maximal territory, bounded by the sea to the north, the Dives to the west, the Seine to the east, and a line of forests running along the Charentonne valley to the south-east, as far south as Vimoutiers. François Cottin proposed a smaller territory between the Dives and the Risle, with a southern frontier joining the sources of the two rivers. The marshy valley of the Dives is the one securely established limit, on the west. Aerial survey has confirmed this western frontier on the left bank of the Dives, and Lepaumier suggests that before the conquest the territory may have reached further west, perhaps to the Orne rather than the Dives. To the west, across the Dives, lay the Baiocasses and Viducasses, to the south and east the Aulerci Eburovices, and towards the Seine the Veliocasses and Calètes.

The territory takes in two natural regions, the Pays d'Auge, a country of pasture and hedged fields, and the Lieuvin to the east, of open cultivated land. Three roughly parallel rivers cross it from south to north: from west to east, the Dives, the Touques and the Risle. All three are slow-flowing and marshy in their lower courses. The coast alternates cliffs and sand bars, and offers few natural harbours apart from the river estuaries.

== History ==
During the revolt of the Veneti in 56 BC, the Lexovii joined the coalition against Rome. Caesar reports that they put their own senate to death for refusing to sanction war on Rome, closed the gates of their oppidum, and joined the rising.

After the conquest the people formed the civitas of the Lexovii. In the Augustan period the centre of the community shifted from the oppidum of the Castellier to Noviomagus, later Lisieux, a new settlement in the plain, at the meeting of several roads and two rivers, whose Gaulish name means 'new market'. In late antiquity the civitas belonged to the province of Lugdunensis Secunda, and its territory is reflected in the medieval diocese of Lisieux.

== Society ==
Caesar's narrative implies that the Lexovii had a senate before the conquest, and Hubert Lepaumier regards their pre-conquest organisation as strongly centralised, comparable to that of a small state.

Their magistracies are known almost entirely from coins. After the Gallic War the Lexovii struck a series of inscribed bronzes, which Louis-Pol Delestrée regards as the only civic or communal coinage of its kind in Gaul. The legends combine the names and titles of magistrates, the ethnonym (LIXOVIO), and a Romanized denomination, SIMISSOS PVPLICOS, 'public semisses'.

Two magistrates are named: Cisiambos, styled vergobreto (the vergobret, the supreme annual magistrate found among several Gaulish peoples), and Mavpennos, styled arcantodan(nos), an official concerned with coinage or with the control of metal. The reading of the legend CISIAMBOS CATTOS VERGOBRETO is disputed. Louis-Pol Delestrée takes it to name a single man, Cisiambos, surnamed Cattos ('the cat'), holding the vergobretship. Hubert Lepaumier reads two dignitaries, Cisiambos and Cattos. The few coins found in stratified contexts, at the sanctuary of Bois-l'Abbé and the fanum of Évreux, come from Augustan levels, and the issue was brief and local.

== Economy ==
The Iron Age farmsteads at Quetteville, on the western edge of the territory, have yielded a substantial agricultural toolkit, including an ard share, a scythe blade and an iron shovel, together with evidence of ironworking, pointing to a mixed economy of farming and metalworking.

According to Strabo, goods bound for Britain were carried overland to the Seine, shipped down to the ocean through the territories of the Lexovii and the Calètes, and from there taken across to Britain in less than a day. Noviomagus, the 'new market', stood where land routes met navigable water, and served as the commercial as well as the political centre of the civitas.

== Settlement and material culture ==
The chief stronghold of the Lexovii before the conquest was the oppidum of the Castellier, on the communes of Saint-Désir and Saint-Pierre-des-Ifs, about 3 km south-west of the later Lisieux. At some 167 hectares it was one of the largest oppida in northern Gaul. Arcisse de Caumont and later Mortimer Wheeler identified it as the principal oppidum of the people. Its rampart is of murus gallicus type and belongs to the La Tène D period, and excavation has shown occupation in the final La Tène phase, with imported amphorae of the Dressel 1 and late Graeco-Italic types and traces of iron-forging near the rampart. The site was largely given up in the Augustan period as the population moved to Noviomagus in the plain.

Rural settlements of the final Iron Age have been excavated at Quetteville: enclosed farmsteads with timber buildings, whose pottery is of the glauconitic fabric typical of the Lexovian assemblage. After the conquest the civitas capital was Noviomagus (Lisieux), in the valley of the Touques at its confluence with the Orbiquet, a river port and route centre. The road network converged on the town, and a milestone found at Frénouville, set up under Trajan in AD 98, records the distance to it. Several fana stood near the boundaries of the territory, at river crossings, among them the large sanctuary of Berthouville, close to the frontier with the Veliocasses and the Aulerci Eburovices.

== Religion ==
As elsewhere in Gaul, the principal deity of the Lexovii was Mercury. Patrice Lajoye links a sanctuary at the Vieux-Lisieux, and the place-name Montlion (from Lugdunum, 'hill of Lug'), with the god Lug, whom the Roman Mercury replaced.

At the sanctuary of Berthouville (ancient Canetonum), on the eastern edge of the territory, three items of the silver hoard bear dedications to Mercurius Canetonnessis, the god under a local epithet.

At Jort (ancient *Divoritum), on the Dives at the frontier with the Viducasses, a bronze stylus was found bearing on one face a dedication to the god Toutatis (TOVTATI). The other face gives the name of the dedicant, read as Sextus Cosius Vebrus, a Roman citizen with an indigenous name.
