= Durocasses =

Gallic tribe

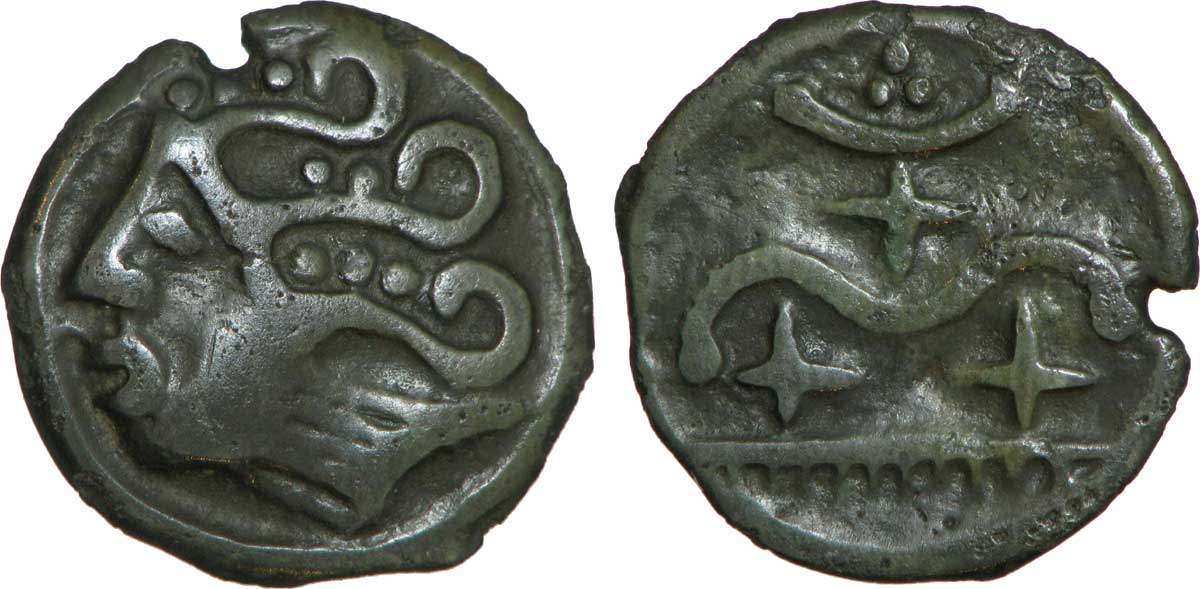
Coins minted by the Durocasses.

The Durocasses were a Gallic tribe dwelling around present-day Dreux during the Roman period.

== Name ==
They are mentioned Durocasis (var. durocacasis) on the Itinerarium Antonini (early 3rd c. AD), as Durocassio on the Tabula Peutingeriana (4–5th c. AD), and as Dorocas on Merovingian coins.

The etymology of the ethnonym Durocasses is uncertain. The meaning of the second element -casses, attested in other Gaulish ethnonyms such as Bodiocasses, Sucasses, Tricasses, Veliocasses, or Viducasses, has been debated. It has traditionally been interpreted as '(curly) hair, hairstyle' (cf. Old Irish chass 'curl'), perhaps referring to a particular warrior coiffure.

Noting that the name had not previously received a satisfactory interpretation, Mélanie Mairecolas and Jean-Marie Pailler connect the element cass- with 'tin' rather than with 'hair' (cf. Gaulish Cassi-dannos, 'magistrate in charge of bronze coins', Britt. Cassivellaunus, 'Chief-of-Tin'; also Greek κασσίτερος 'tin'), and read Durocasses as 'those of the fort (or relay) of the tin' (from duro- 'fort, place' attached -casses 'tin').

The city of Dreux, attested ca. 930 AD as Drocas (Drewes in the 12th c.), is named after the Gallic tribe.

== Geography ==
Mélanie Mairecolas and Jean-Marie Pailler identify their chief oppidum with the bronze-rich site of Fort Harrouard, a few kilometres from Dreux.

== Economy ==
The production of coins by the Durocasses suggests that they benefited from some economic autonomy. Their wealth probably came from tolls collected on the inland water shipping on the Eure river.
