= Patrizia de Bernardo Stempel =

Italian philologist, linguist and scholar of Celtic studies

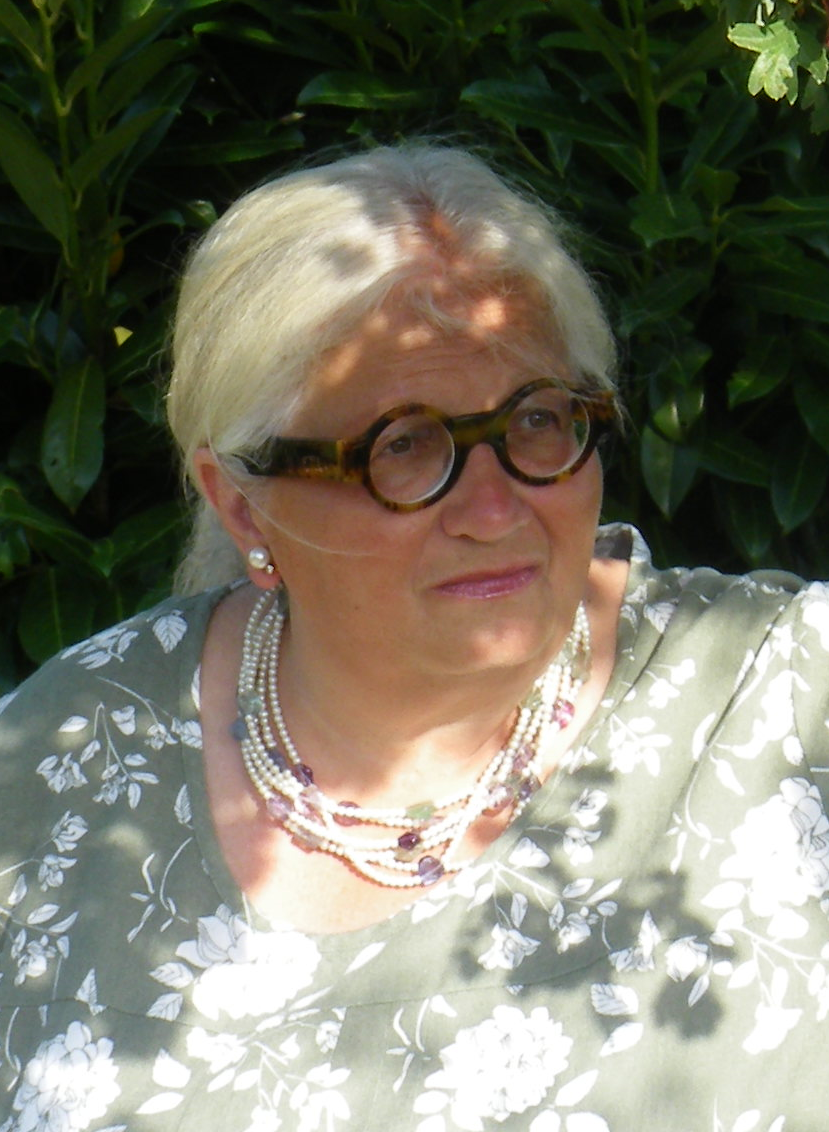
- Born: Patrizia de Bernardo; 5 April 1953 (age 73); Milan, Italy
- Occupations: Philologist, linguist
- Spouse: Reinhard Stempel

Academic background
- Education: University of Milan; University of Bonn
- Thesis: The development of the Indo-European liquid and nasal sonants in Celtic

Patrizia de Bernardo Stempel (born 5 April 1953) is an Italian philologist, linguist and scholar of Celtic studies.

== Biography ==
Patrizia de Bernardo was born on 5 April 1953 in Milan, Italy, the daughter of Mario de Bernardo and Adriana Marra. She studied classics at the University of Milan, where she earned a PhD in 1977. Between 1977 and 1981, she worked as a research assistant at the Institute of Linguistics of the University of Bonn, then as a lecturer in Italian at the Romance Department until 1986. In 1984, she married the German linguist Reinhard Stempel. The following year, she earned a PhD summa cum laude in Celtic philology, Indo-European linguistics and Romance philology at the University of Bonn, with a dissertation on "The development of the Indo-European liquid and nasal sonants in Celtic".

From 1987 to 1989, de Bernardo Stempel was a postdoctoral fellow at the German Research Foundation, then served as a research assistant at the Institute of Linguistics of the University of Bochum from 1989 to 1991. Between 1991 and 1994, she was a lecturer in Latin and Greek Linguistics at the Department of Classical Philology at the University of Düsseldorf, then a research assistant at the Department of Romance Languages at the University of Mainz (1995–1999). In 2000, she became an associate professor in Classical Studies at the University of the Basque Country, where she has been working as a Full Professor since 2011.

== Works ==
- Die Vertretung der indogermanischen liquiden und nasalen Sonanten im Keltischen. Institut für Sprachwissenschaft der Universität Innsbruck. 1987. ISBN 978-3-85124-593-6.
- Nominale Wortbildung des älteren Irischen: Stammbildung und Derivation. Walter de Gruyter. 2011. ISBN 978-3-11-093155-6.
- Muttergöttinnen und ihre Votivformulare: eine sprachhistorische Studie. Universitätsverlag Winter. 2021. ISBN 978-3-8253-4833-5.
