= Senones (Cisalpine Gaul) =

Ancient Gallic tribe in Italy

The Senones were a Gallic people who settled in the Italian peninsula, on the Adriatic coast of what is now the Marche, during the 4th century BC. They were a branch of the Senones of the Seine basin in Gaul, from whom they took their name. Settling between Ariminum (modern Rimini) and Ancona, in the strip later known as the ager Gallicus, the Senones displaced the Umbrians who had held the coast. Roman tradition made them the leaders of the Gallic war-band that captured Rome after the Battle of the Allia in 390 BC. They remained an enemy of Rome for the next century, until a Roman army defeated them in 283 BC and annexed their land, after which they disappeared from Italy, either expelled or destroyed. The Senones are known above all from their cemeteries, in particular those of Montefortino and Santa Paolina di Filottrano, which have yielded some of the finest La Tène metalwork found in Italy.

== Name ==
The Senones of Italy bear the same name as the Senones of the Seine basin, of whom the ancient writers regarded them as a branch. Their deeds in Italy are reported chiefly by Polybius, Diodorus Siculus, Livy, and Appian, while Strabo, Pliny, and Ptolemy place them on the Adriatic coast.

The Gaulish ethnonym Senones is generally interpreted as meaning 'the ancient ones', by deriving the name from the Proto-Celtic root *sen- ('old'; cf. Old Irish sen; Middle Welsh hen 'old') extended by the suffix *-on-es. Pierre-Yves Lambert has also proposed an etymology from the root *sen(H)-, meaning 'to gain, vanquish'.

== Geography ==
In Italy the Senones held a strip of the Adriatic coast that the Romans called the ager Gallicus, the 'Gallic land'. Livy places their territory between the river Utens, perhaps the modern Montone, and the Aesis (the modern Esino). Stéphane Bourdin observes that these two rivers more likely mark the limits of the ager Gallicus, the land later confiscated by Rome, than the bounds of Senonian settlement, since several of the cemeteries assigned to the Senones lie south of the Aesis. To the north lay the Boii, to the south and among them the Picenes, and inland the Umbrians.

Although the Senones are counted among the Cisalpine Gauls, their land lay on the Adriatic side of the Apennines rather than in the Po plain held by the Insubres, Boii, and Cenomani.

== History ==
=== Migration ===
The arrival of transalpine Celts in northern Italy at the beginning of the 4th century BC marks the entry of the Celtic peoples of inner Europe into recorded history. A literary tradition transmitted by Livy traced the Gallic migration into Italy to a much earlier expedition led by Bellovesus, nephew of the Biturigan king Ambigatus, and dated it to around 600 BC. Venceslas Kruta treats that account as a legendary myth of origins with no archaeological foundation at so early a date, and places the historical settlement in the 4th century BC. In Livy's narrative the Senones are the last of the migrating peoples to reach Italy, settling the Adriatic coast after the Boii and Lingones had taken the Po plain. The earliest archaeological traces of the Senones in the Marche belong to the middle, or even the second quarter, of the 4th century BC, while their definitive settlement is usually placed in the second half of the century. Their hold on the land was discontinuous, and it did not bring about the disappearance of the earlier Umbrian and Picene inhabitants, with whom they mingled.

=== Wars with Rome ===
According to the ancient accounts, a Gallic army, which some writers say was formed among the Senones and which was led by a chief named Brennus, crossed the Apennines and laid siege to the Etruscan city of Clusium. Roman envoys sent to mediate joined the defenders in the fighting and killed one of the Gallic leaders. When Rome refused to surrender them, the Gauls abandoned the siege and marched on the city, defeating the Roman army at the Allia and sacking Rome in 390 BC.

For the next hundred years the Senones remained a danger to Rome. In 295 BC they joined a coalition of Samnites, Etruscans, and Umbrians against Rome at Sentinum, on the border of Umbria and the Marche. The Etruscans withdrew to defend their own territory, and the battle was fought by the Gauls and the Samnites. After a long and uncertain struggle the Romans prevailed, and the Samnite commander Gellius Egnatius was killed.

=== Roman annexation ===
A Roman victory in 283 BC brought the effective end of the Senones. Their territory was annexed, and the colony of Sena Gallica was established on the coast, followed by Ariminum in 268 BC. The Roman tradition holds that the Senones were expelled or destroyed and so vanished from Italy. Stéphane Bourdin observes that the archaeological record points to a less complete outcome, with part of the population remaining in place. In 232 BC the remaining public land was distributed to individual Roman settlers under a law carried by the tribune Gaius Flaminius.

== Archaeology ==
=== Cemeteries ===
Most of what is known of the Italian Senones comes from their cemeteries. The largest, at Montefortino, was excavated in 1899 and yielded about fifty inhumation graves, divided almost equally between burials with weapons and burials whose ornaments mark them as those of women. The grave goods fall into three phases, the earliest dated by Attic red-figure pottery to the middle of the 4th century BC. At Santa Paolina di Filottrano, some twenty kilometers southwest of Ancona, a score of graves excavated before the First World War included the very rich grave 2, the burial of a woman, with a solid gold torque, other gold ornaments, bronze and silver vessels, and Attic vases attributed to the so-called Filottrano Painter.

An isolated warrior grave found at Moscano di Fabriano in 1955 held a bronze helmet, a La Tène sword in a scabbard with an embossed bronze front-plate, horse harness, a bronze fibula, imported Etruscan and Campanian bronze vessels, and Attic red-figure and black-gloss pottery that dates the burial to the second quarter of the 4th century BC. It is one of the principal chronological markers for La Tène material in Italy.

=== Transalpine connections ===
The earliest La Tène objects from Senonian territory point to close ties with Champagne and the neighboring parts of Gaul, from which the settlers had come. The gold torque from Filottrano fits the sequence of high-status female ornament in northern Champagne, where such a torque was worn together with two matching bracelets, and the fibula from Moscano di Fabriano has its closest parallels in the same region. The clearest link is a technical one: the same punch used to decorate one of the Senonian sword scabbards was also used on a scabbard from the cemetery of Epiais-Rhus, northwest of Paris, evidence of direct contact between workshops more than a thousand kilometers apart. Kruta connects the appearance of the Senones in Italy with a marked fall in the population of Champagne around the end of the 5th century BC.

=== Senones and Picenes ===
The grave goods of the Senones show rapid acculturation. In the men's burials only the weapons, the sword in its decorated scabbard, the helmet, and the lance and javelin heads, are consistently of La Tène type, while the rest of the assemblage, the bronze and painted vessels, the strigils, and the gaming pieces, is Mediterranean in character. Stéphane Bourdin connects this with the survival of the local Umbrian and Picene population.

In some places the Senones appear as distinct groups, but elsewhere graves containing Celtic weapons are found within otherwise Picene cemeteries, as at Numana and Camerano. Whether these are the burials of Celts settled among the Picenes or of Picenes who had taken up Celtic arms is hard to decide. The settlements of the Senones are not known. Only the cemeteries can be securely attributed to them, and their dwellings may have been the same Picene sites in their final phase.

=== Disappearence ===
The date at which the Senones ceased to exist as an armed community is disputed. The literary tradition places their defeat in 283 BC. Venceslas Kruta argues that the effective Roman occupation of their land can hardly be later than the founding of Ariminum in 268 BC, and that the weapons from the Marche graves support a high chronology. The chain suspension for swords that became standard elsewhere between about 280 and 270 BC is absent from Senonian territory, which in his view leaves no support for an armed Senonian presence after about 270 BC. Maurizio Landolfi and Daniele Vitali have argued instead for a lower chronology, dating some of the weapon graves at Montefortino into the later 3rd or even the early 2nd century BC on the evidence of their black-gloss pottery. Kruta replies that the black-gloss vessels were never properly published, and that the swords, scabbards, and suspension types in those graves all belong to the 4th and early 3rd centuries BC. He holds that the high chronology remains the more coherent.
