= Acco (Senones) =

Senonian aristocrat during the Gallic Wars (died 53 BC)

- Born: c. 1st century BC; Gaul
- Died: 53 BC; Durocortorum
- Cause of death: Fustuarium
- Occupation: Aristocrat
- Known for: Resisting the Roman conquest of Gaul

Acco (died 53 BC) was an aristocrat who belonged to the Senones, a Gallic people who resided along the Seine in the 1st century BC. Around 57 BC, the Senones surrendered to the Roman legions as they invaded northern Gaul but in 53 BC, Acco conspired with members of the Senones and Carnutes to revolt against the Roman occupiers.

On the conclusion of the war and after a conference at Durocortorum, Julius Caesar had Acco tried and convicted on charges of treason. As punishment, he was sentenced to death by fustuarium (flogging), the traditional Roman punishment for deserters. Acco's execution upset many members of the Gallic aristocracy and contributed to their participation the revolt of Vercingetorix in 52 BC.

== Etymology ==
The name Acco is likely derived from the Gaulish word acu meaning ("fast", "spirited") and so can literally be translated as "the swift".

== Biography ==
=== Early history ===
Acco was an aristocrat who belonged to the Senones, a Gallic people who resided in the Seine basin in the 1st century BC. The Senones were ruled by a king but possessed a senate and had close ties to the neighboring Aedui and Parisii, the latter of which they had been joined at one time as a single state. In 58 BC, Julius Caesar would begin his conquest of Gaul and after the tribe submitted to the Romans, he would remove the Senonian king Moritasgus and replace him with his more Roman-aligned brother, Cavarinus.

=== Conspiracy against Cavarinus ===
In the winter of 54–53 BC, unrest among the Gallic tribes in Roman-occupied Gaul culminated in the outbreak of several revolts against Roman rule such as Ambiorix's revolt and the assassination of Tasgetius. Among the Senones, Acco would instigate a conspiracy to assassinate Cavarinus that would be discovered, leading Cavarinus to flee the territory. The conspirators would dispatch messengers to Caesar to excuse their actions but refused his demand for the entire Senonian senate to come before him.

In the spring of 53 BC, Caesar announced a convention of representatives from all the Gallic tribes which the Senones failed to attend along with the Carnutes and the Treveri. Caesar deemed their absence a sign that they were preparing to revolt and decided to lead a force to the territory of the Senones immediately. When news of Caesar's approach reached the Senones, Acco attempted to organize resistance but failed to before the Romans arrived and instead surrendered.

=== Trial and death ===
After putting down the remaining revolts in northern Gaul, Caesar would organize another convention of Gallic representatives in the city of Durocortorum (modern-day Reims), the capital of the Remi tribe. There he ordered an investigation into the conspiracies against Cavarinus and Tasgetius and, upon determining Acco to be the primary conspirator, sentenced him to be executed by means of fustuarium or flogging.

In his writings, Caesar listed outrage over the execution of Acco among the Gallic nobility as a contributing factor to the pan-Gallic rebellion of Vercingetorix the following year.
