= Ariolica =

Ariolica was the name of several different places in ancient geography:

- Pontarlier, France
- Ariolica (Aulerci), an important settlement of the Aulerci Brannovices tribe in the Lugdunensis region of Gaul, identified with La Pacaudière, France (or alternatively with the nearby Avrilly)
- Ariolica (Alpes Graiae), a Roman station probably located at or near La Thuile, Italy
- also called Ardelica (or Arilica or Arelica), now modern Peschiera del Garda, Italy
