= Aulerci Cenomani =

Gallic tribe

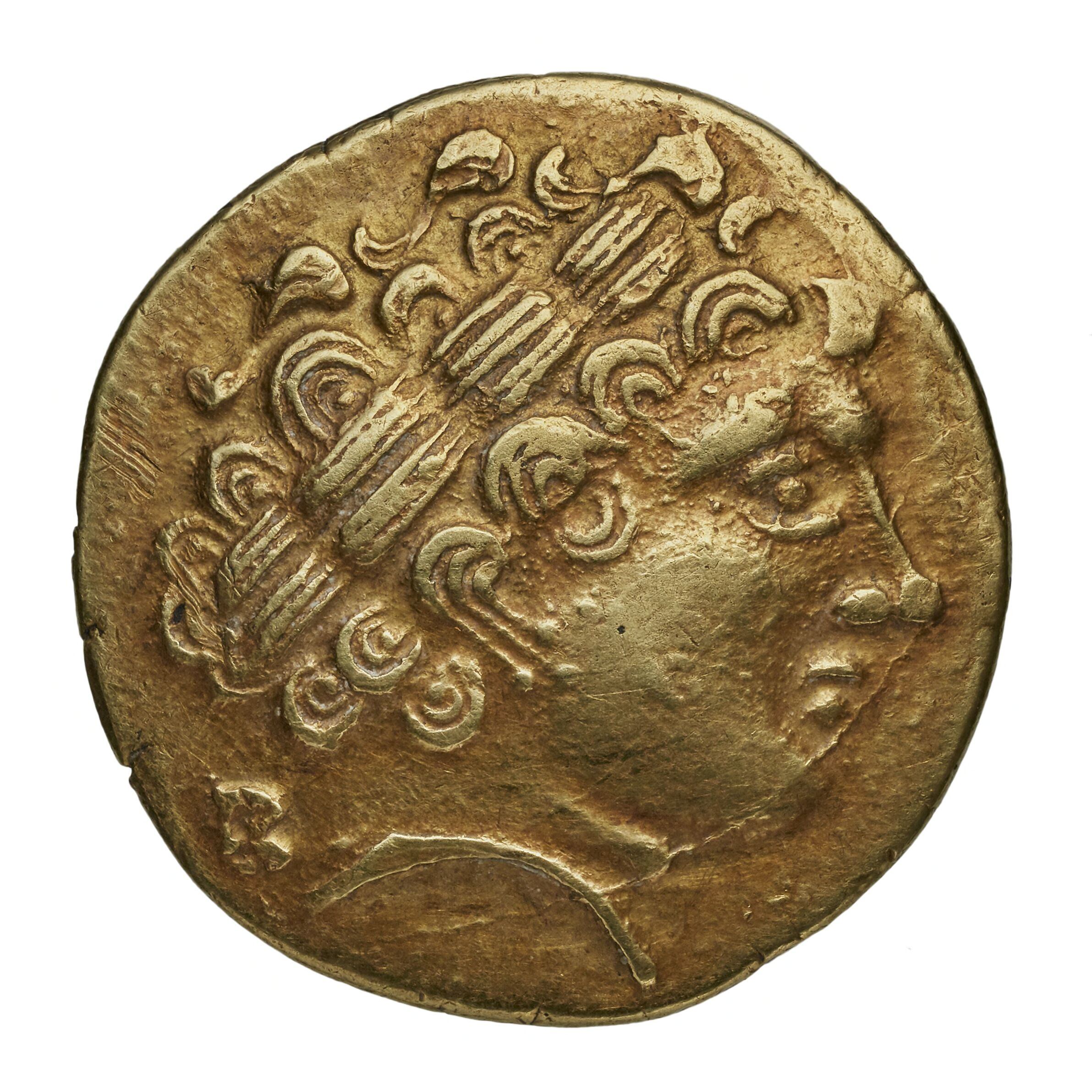
A gold stater (obverse) of the Cenomani

The Aulerci Cenomani (or Aulerci Cenomanni) were a Gallic tribe dwelling in the modern Sarthe department during the Iron Age and the Roman period. The Cenomani were the most powerful of the Aulerci tribes.

== Name ==
=== Attestations ===
They are mentioned as Aulercos and Aulercis, Cenomanis totidem [all the same] by Caesar (mid-1st c. BC), Aulerci .... Cenomani by Pliny (1st c. AD), as Au̓lírkioioi̔ oi̔ Kenománnoi (Αὐλίρκιοιοἱ οἱ Κενομάννοι) by Ptolemy (2nd c. AD), and as Ceromannos in the Notitia Dignitatum (5th c. AD).

Other peoples named Aulerci are also mentioned by ancient sources: the Aulerci Brannovices, Aulerci Diablintes, and Aulerci Eburovices. The relationship that linked them together remains uncertain. According to historian Venceslas Kruta, they could have been pagi that got separated from a larger ethnic group during the pre-Roman period.

Two homonym tribes, the Cenomani of Cisalpine Gaul and the Cenomani around Massalia, are also attested.

=== Etymology ===
The meaning of the Gaulish ethnonym Cenomani remains uncertain. The prefix probably stems from the root ceno-, which could have meant 'far, long'. The second element may derive from manos ('good'), or else from the root *menH- ('to go'), with Cenomani as 'the far-going one'. Patrizia de Bernardo Stempel has similarly glossed the ethnonym as 'the far-goers'. Pierre-Yves Lambert has also proposed a connection to a verbal stem *cene/o- (cf. OIr. cinid 'to spring from, to descend from', Welsh cenedl 'family'). The general meaning would be 'the begotten ones'.

The city of Le Mans, attested c. 400 AD as Ceromannos (Cenomannis in 1101, *Cemans, then Le Mans from the 12th c.), and the Maine region, attested in the 6th c. AD as in Cinomanico (in pago Celmanico in 765, *Cemaine, then Le Maine from the 12th c.), are named after the Gallic tribe.

== Geography ==
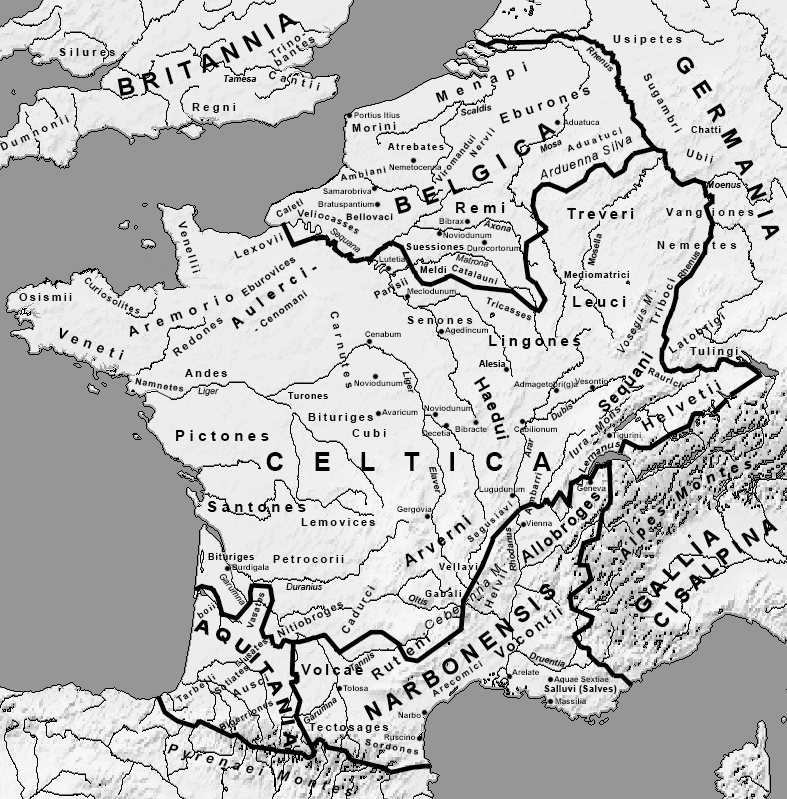
A map of Gaul in the 1st century BC, showing the relative positions of the Celtic tribes

The tribe lived west of the Carnutes between the Seine and the Loire.

Their chief town was Vindinum or Suindinum (corrupted into 'Subdinnum'), afterwards Civitas Cenomanorum (whence Le Mans, and much later the Cenomanian geological age) and later Cenomani as in the Notitia Dignitatum, the original name of the town, as usual in the case of Gallic cities, being replaced by that of the people.

== History ==
According to Caesar (Bell. Gall. vii.75.3), they assisted Vercingetorix in the great rising (52 BC) with a force of 5000 men. Under Augustus they formed a civitas stipendiaria (Roman tributary town) of Gallia Lugdunensis, and in the 4th century part of Gallia Lugdunensis III.

== Cisalpine Cenomani ==
There was another people called Cenomani that held extensive territory in Cisalpine Gaul; however, there is disagreement whether they are one and the same people. The orthography and the quantity of the penultimate vowel of Cenomani have given rise to discussion. According to Arbois de Jubainville, the Cenomni of Italy are not identical with the Cehomni (or Cenomanni) of Gaul. In the case of the latter, the survival of the syllable man in "Le Mans" is due to the stress laid on the vowel; had the vowel been short and unaccented, it would have disappeared. In Italy, Cenomani is the name of a people; in Gaul, merely a surname of the Aulerci. William Smith adopts the difference, placing the peoples in two separate articles in his Dictionary of Greek and Roman Geography. On the other hand, if the tradition recorded by Cato (in Pliny, Nat. Hist. iii. 19. s. 23) is true, that the Cenomani formed a settlement near Massilia (modern Marseille), among the Volcae, this could indicate a route that the Cenomani took to Cisalpine Gaul in Italy. According to Livy, the Cenomani of Cisalpine Gaul arrived after the expedition of Bellovesus, led by Helitovius, and are credited with the foundation of Brixia, or Brescia, and Verona.
