= Diablintes =

Ancient Gallic people from northwest France

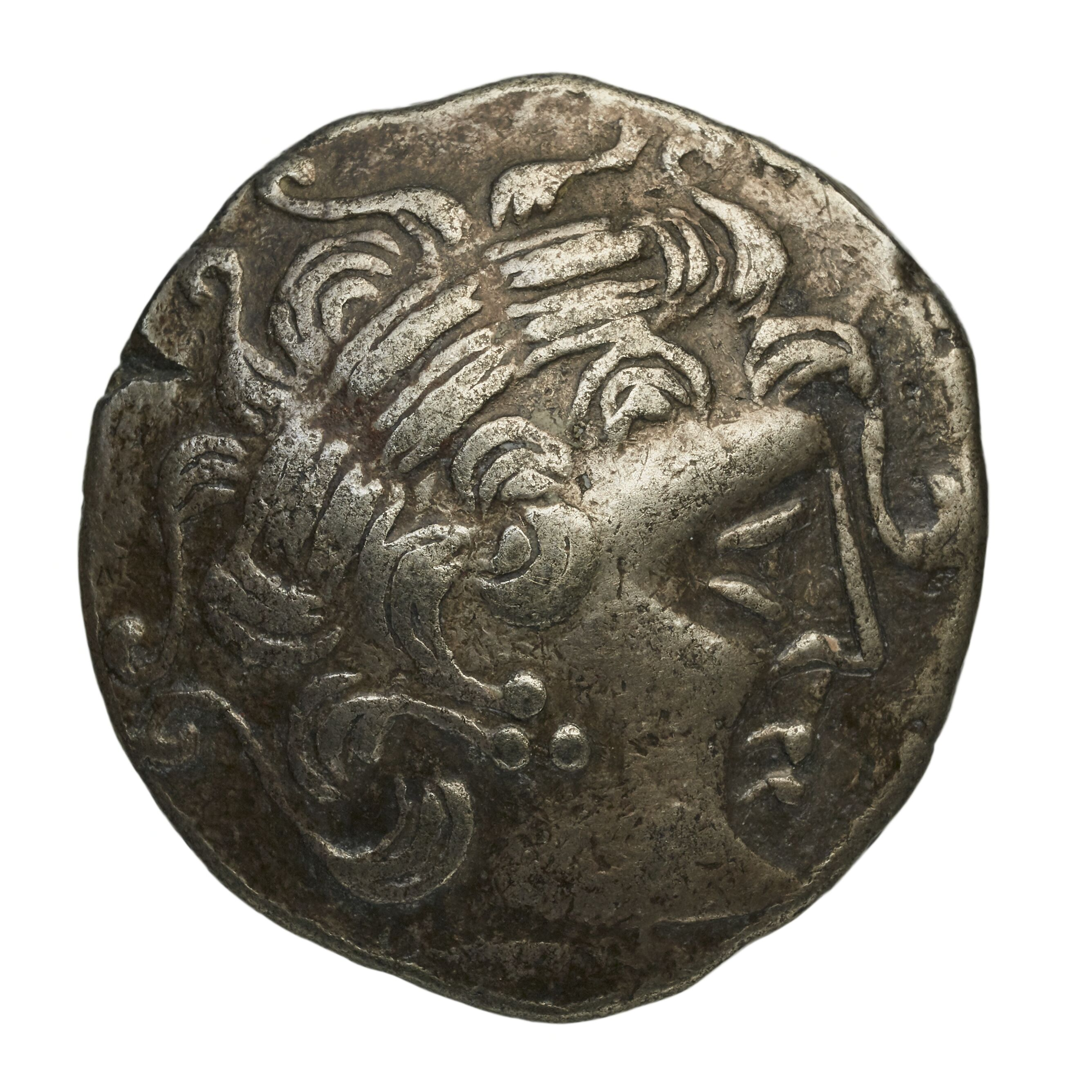
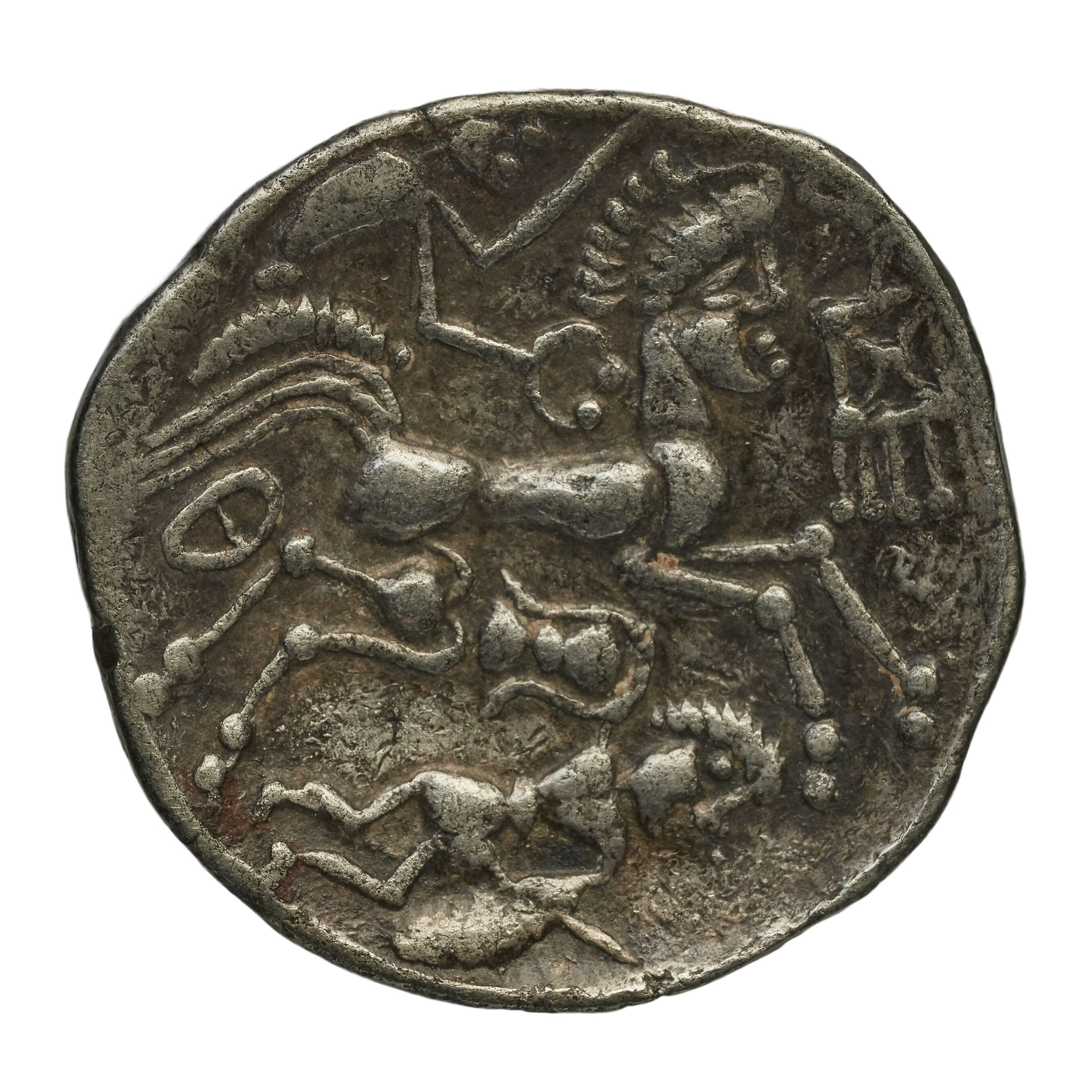
Silver coin of the Diablintes with a laureate head of the Apollo type and a fantastical scene of chariot racing: holding a torc and extending a vexillum that dangles in front, the charioteer drives a biga drawn by a man-headed horse that surmounts a prone spiky-haired figure (perhaps a genius) under a vessel

The Diablintes or Aulerci Diablites (also Diablintres or Diablindes) were a Gallic tribe dwelling in the north of the modern Mayenne department during the Iron Age and the Roman period. They were part of the Aulerci.

== Name ==
They are named as Diablintes (var. Diablintres, Diablindes) by Caesar (mid-1st c. BC), Diablinti by Pliny (1st c. AD), Aúlírkioi hoi Diablítai or Diaultai (Αύλίρκιοι οἱ Διαβλίται/Διαυλται) by Ptolemy (2nd c. AD), and as Diablentas by Orosius (early 5th c. AD).

The meaning of the name is unclear. Pierre-Yves Lambert has proposed a connection with the Proto-Celtic root *dwēblo- ('double'; cf. Old Irish díabul), attached to an -e-nt- participial suffix, or perhaps to *anto-/*ento- ('face'; cf. Old Irish étan; also Bret. Daou-dal 'two-faced').

Other peoples named Aulerci are also mentioned by ancient sources: the Aulerci Cenomani, Aulerci Eburovices, and Aulerci Brannovices. The relationship that linked them together remains uncertain. According to historian Venceslas Kruta, they could have been pagi that got separated from a larger ethnic group during the pre-Roman period.

The city of Jublains, attested ca. 400 as civitas Diablintum ('civitas of the Diablintes', Jublent ca. 1100) is named after the Gallic tribe.

== Geography ==
Map of the peoples of Armorica (northwest France) around the time of Julius Caesar

Julius Caesar (B. G. iii. 9) mentions the Diablintes among the allies of the Veneti and other Armoric states whom Caesar attacked. The Diablintes are mentioned between the Morini and Menapii. The territory of the Diablintes seems to have been small, and it may have been included in that of the Cenomanni, or the former diocese of Mans. (D'Anville, Notice, &c.; Walekenaer, Géog., &c. vol. i. p. 387.)

Their position can be calculated from Pliny's enumeration, Cariosvelites, Diablindi, Rhedones. The capital of the Diablintes, according to Ptolemy, was Noeodunum, probably the Nudium of the Table. The Notitia of the Gallic provinces, which belongs to the beginning of the fifth century, mentions Civitas Diablintum among the cities of Lugdunensis Tertia. A document of the seventh century speaks of condita Diablintica as situated in Pago Cenomannico (about modern Le Mans), and thus one location of the Diablintes is clear. This document also helps explain why Ptolemy used the name Aulerci for both the Diablintes and Cenomanni. Another document of the seventh century speaks of oppidum Diablintes juxta ripam Araenae fiuvioli; where the Arena (araenae) is recognised as the Aron, a tributary of the Mayenne. The small town of Jublains (or Jubleins), where Roman remains have been found, not far from the town of Mayenne to the southeast, is probably the site of the Civitas Diablintum and Noeodunum (also rendered Noiódounon; Νοιόδουνον).

A wooden tablet found in London records the sale of one Fortunata, a Diablintian slave girl.

== See also ==
- Jublains archeological site
