= Tour de Grisset =

Gallo-Roman temple remains

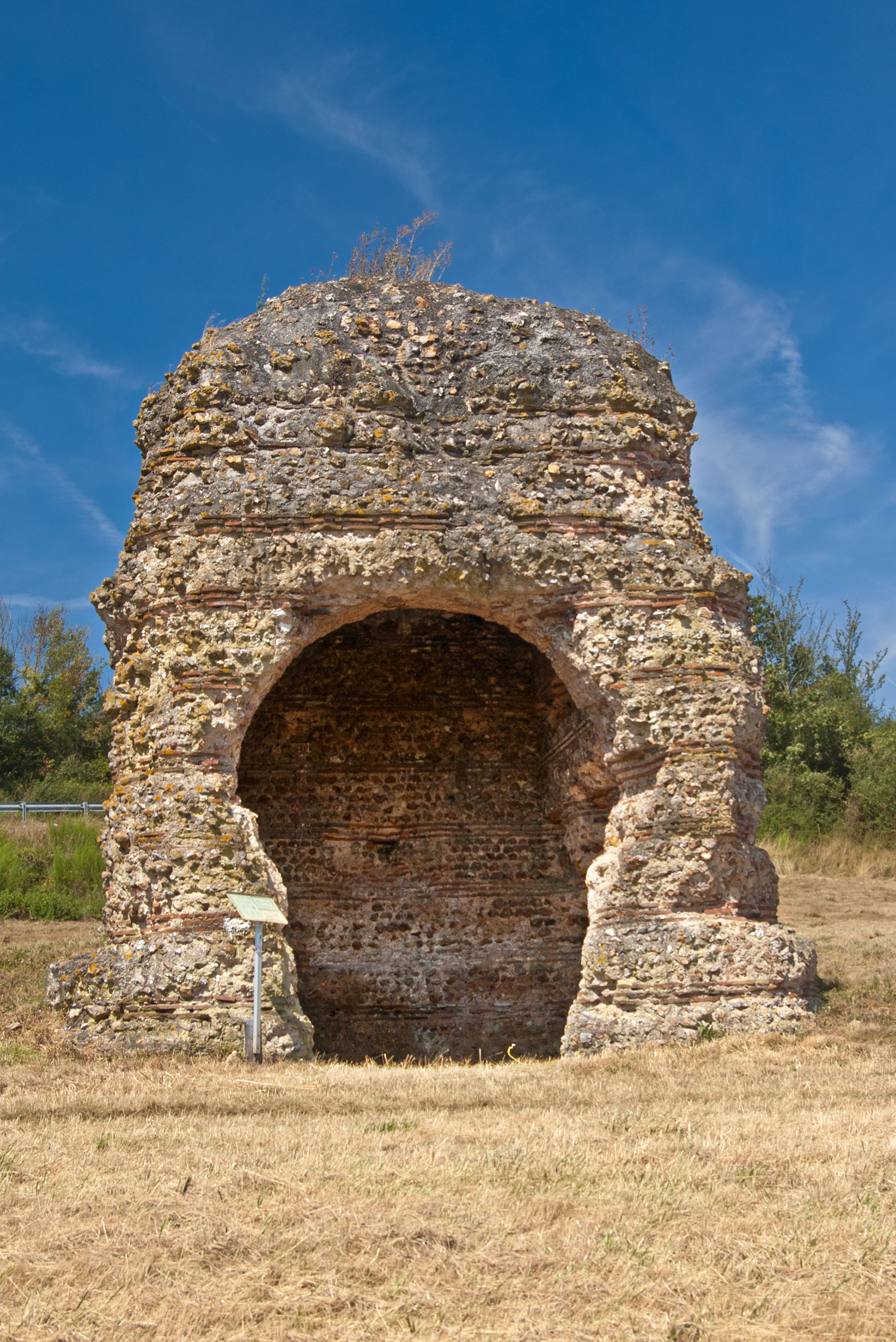
- Eastern façade

- Location within France
- 47°53′47″N 1°11′01″E
- Type: Romano-Celtic Temple
- Periods: Classical Antiquity
- Cultures: Gallo-Roman
- Location: Fréteval, Loir-et-Cher, France
- Region: Centre-Val de Loire

History
- Built: 2nd to 3rd century CE

Site notes
- Material: Limestone, sandstone, terracotta
- Elevation: 103 m (338 ft)
- Excavation dates: 1964-65, 1995
- Condition: Ruined
- Owner: Commune
- Public access: Yes

Monument historique
- Designated: 1948, 1991

The Tour de Grisset (Grisset Tower) is the remains of a small, Gallo-Roman temple or fanum located in Fréteval, Loir-et-Cher, France. It is one of the few Gallo-Roman fana to still be standing, and perhaps the only one with its brick vault still in place. Excavations in the 1960s revealed a bath complex and series of other structures at the site, and it has been proposed that a small, secondary agglomeration of structures (possibly additional fana) may also exist there.

== Location ==
Tour de Grisset is located in the commune of Fréteval. It sits on the left bank of the Loir, halfway up a gentle slope.

== Research history ==
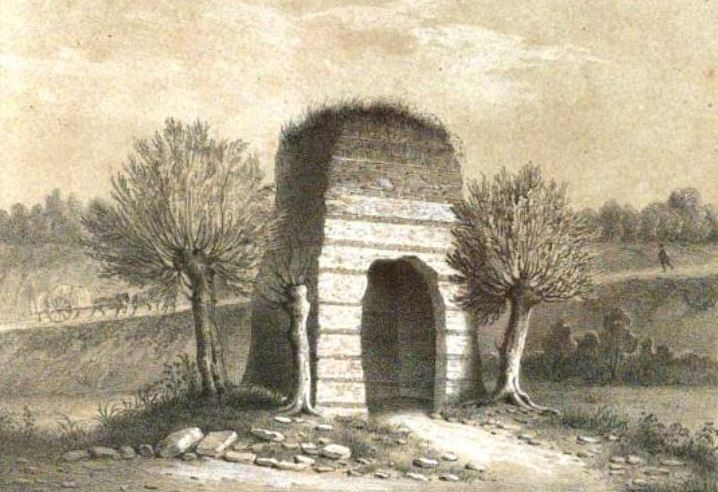
Tour de Grisset, by Gervais Launay (1849)

No mention of the tower is known before the 19th century, and it was in 1849 that a description and drawing of the fanum was first published. At the beginning of the 20th century, sections of walls belonging to other ancient buildings at the site could still be seen and were studied there. But after the First World War, interest declined and the remains of the fanum were not registered as historical monuments until 1948.

In 1963, the president of the Archaeological Society of Vendômois was alerted to the possible existence of architectural remains other than the fanum. Excavations took place in 1964 and 1965, at what turned out to be a bath complex. From 1968, aerial surveys revealed the presence of other buildings which were not excavated, allowing the filing of an application for protection with the Ministry of Culture, which resulted in the registration of the entire site in 1991. An exhaustive architectural survey was carried out in 1995.

== Description ==
=== The fanum ===
Tour de Grisset makes up the remains of an ancient fanum's cella. It is one of only a handful still standing, and is noted for being the only known example whose vaulted ceiling survives.

The monument's exterior measures 6.80 × 6.15 m (22.31 × 20.18 feet), for interior dimensions of 3.65 by 3.60 metres (12.0 ft × 11.8 ft), and a ceiling height of 7.15 metres (23.5 ft).

The fanum is an example of Roman architecture that is adapted to the resources of the site. The walls are blockage clad with small sandstone or limestone rubble siding, alternating with beds of two to three rows of terracotta. The walls reach 1.3 metres (4 ft 3 in) in thickness. It is possible, though difficult to prove due to the façade's deterioration, that Tour de Grisset's masonry had geometric patterns made by arrangements of stones with different colors. This practice has been found elsewhere in the region, such as on the temple at Cherré and the Roman city walls of Le Mans.

The temple is estimated to have been built towards the end of the second century, or the first half of the third. In the late 1990s, its cella was found to be exactly in the center of a very small cadastre (12 m × 10 m [39 ft × 33 ft]), which could be the survival of an ancient structure accompanying the cella, perhaps the peripheral gallery of the shrine. Surrounding this on at least three sides is a wall, interpreted as part of the peribolos (court enclosure) of the temple.

=== Environment ===
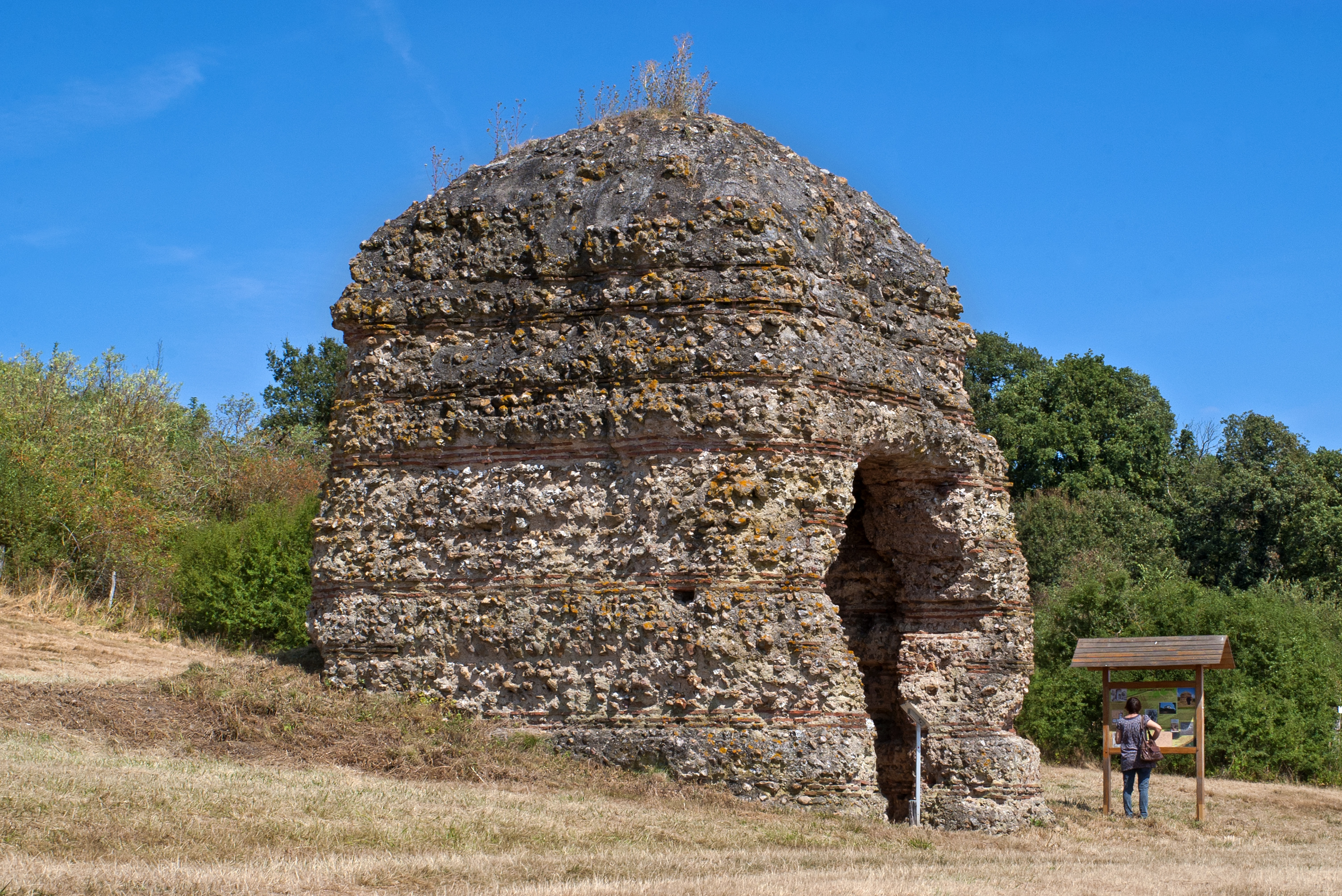
Side view of exterior.

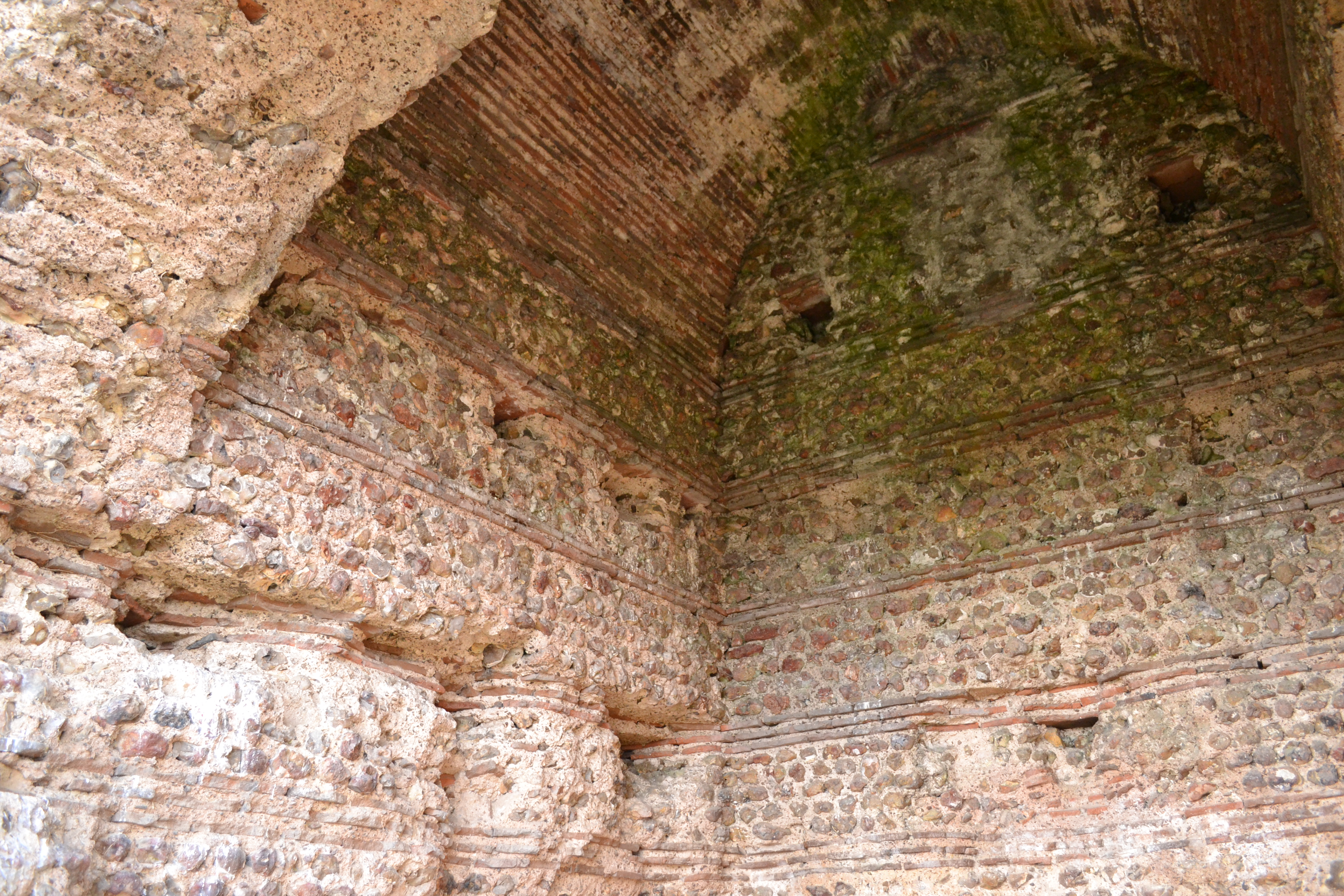
View of interior vault and stonework.

The temple, of which Tour de Grisset is a remnant, was only one part of a vast complex comprising thermal baths partially excavated further south, a system for supplying or draining water, and buildings of still indeterminate function that were detected through aerial surveys. Two of the structures could possibly be fana as well.

The site as a whole suggests the existence of a small, ancient secondary agglomeration, because of the spatial distribution of the remains found so far, which could have arose piecemeal around the sanctuary. An ancient road from Le Mans to Chartres probably ran near the site.

An adjoining site to the north had been called "La Cohue" in medieval times, suggesting it may have served as a place for meetings or fairs, i.e. a conciliabulum.

== See also ==
- Saint-Martin-au-Val Sanctuary

== Bibliography ==
- Fauduet, Isabelle (1993). Les temples de tradition celtique en Gaule romaine (in French). Paris: Errance. p. 159. ISBN 2877720748.
- Lambert, Claude; Rioufreyt, Jean (2006), "Le sanctuaire d'Aubigné-Racan (Sarthe)", in Brouquier-Reddé, Véronique (ed.), Mars en Occident : actes du Colloque International (in French), Rennes: Presses universitaires de Rennes, p. 225, ISBN 9782753502079
- Leymarios, Claude (1965). "Un polissoir inédit près de la Tour de Grisset, commune de Fréteval (Loir-et-Cher)". Bulletin de la Société préhistorique française (in French). 2 (65): 81–84.
- Leymarios, Claude (1999), "Fréteval (Loir-et-Cher)", in Bellet, Michel-Edouard; Cribellier, Christian; Ferdière, Alain (eds.), Agglomérations antiques en région Centre, Supplément à la Revue archéologique du centre de la France (in French), vol. 17, Tours: FERACF, pp. 161–166
- Provost, Michel (1988). Loir-et-Cher. Carte archéologique de la Gaule (in French). Vol. 41. Paris: Éditions de la Maison des sciences de l'homme. pp. 112–113. ISBN 2877540030.

=== External links ===
- "Vestiges archéologiques". pop.culture.gouv.fr. Ministère de la culture. 1992.
