= Aulerci =

Group of Gallic peoples

The Aulerci were a group of Gallic peoples inhabiting regions of Gaul during the Iron Age and the Roman period.

They were divided into the Cenomani, the most powerful of them, the Eburovices, the Diablintes, and the Brannovices.

== Name ==
The Gaulish ethnonym Aulerci is generally interpreted as meaning 'those who are far away from their traces' (tracks, paths), composed of the ablative prefix au- ('out of, away from') attached to the root lerg- ('trace', cf. MIr. lorg, OBret. lerg). Pierre-Yves Lambert has also proposed a comparison with the Old Irish lerg ('slope, brink'), or with the Welsh/Breton alarch ('swan').

== History ==
According to Livy, they joined Bellovesus' legendary migrations towards Italy ca. 600 BC, along with the Aeduii, Ambarri, Arverni, Carnutes and Senones.

The relationship that linked the different tribes together remains uncertain. According to historian Venceslas Kruta, they could have been pagi that got separated from a larger ethnic group during the pre-Roman period.
