= Fortunata (enslaved person) =

Roman enslaved person

Fortunata was a young woman enslaved in the late first-century or early second-century, known from a surviving deed of sale from Londinium (London, UK). This deed of sale was featured as one of the objects in the BBC's A History of the World in 100 Objects.

== Biography ==
Fortunata was a member of the Diablintes people of northwestern Gaul. Her age is not known, but she was sold as a slave in London between AD 80 and 120 (possibly under the reign of Domitian (AD 81–96)) for the price of 600 denarii. Roger Tomlin has argued that she was likely a young adult rather than a child.

=== Deed of sale ===
Enslavement was a legal institution during the Roman Empire. The deed of sale of Fortunata was handwritten into a wax tablet. The text became inscribed into the wooden casing and so its content survived, and the case was discovered during a 1994 excavation at 1 Poultry, London. The text was written in 11 lines into a wooden tablet cut from silver fir. Unusually, some of the black wax survives adhered to the tablet. A translation of the surviving text reads:

Vegetus, assistant slave of Montanus the slave of the August Emperor and sometime assistant slave of Iucundus, has bought and received by mancipium the girl Fortunata, or by whatever name she is known, by nationality a Diablintian, from Albicianus ... for six hundred denarii. And that the girl in question is transferred in good health, that she is warranted not to be liable to wander or run away, but that if anyone lays claim to the girl in question or to any share in her, ... in the wax tablet which he has written and sworn by the genius of the Emperor Caesar ....

The text is revealing for both showing that an enslaved person could themselves own another slave, but also that the cost incurred was significant—600 denarii was equal to two years' salary of a legionary at the time.

== Reception and public display ==
The Fortunata tablet is in the collection of the Museum of London (inventory number: ONE94[18195]<5160>). It featured as one of the objects in the BBC's A History of the World.
