= Treasure of Puteaux =

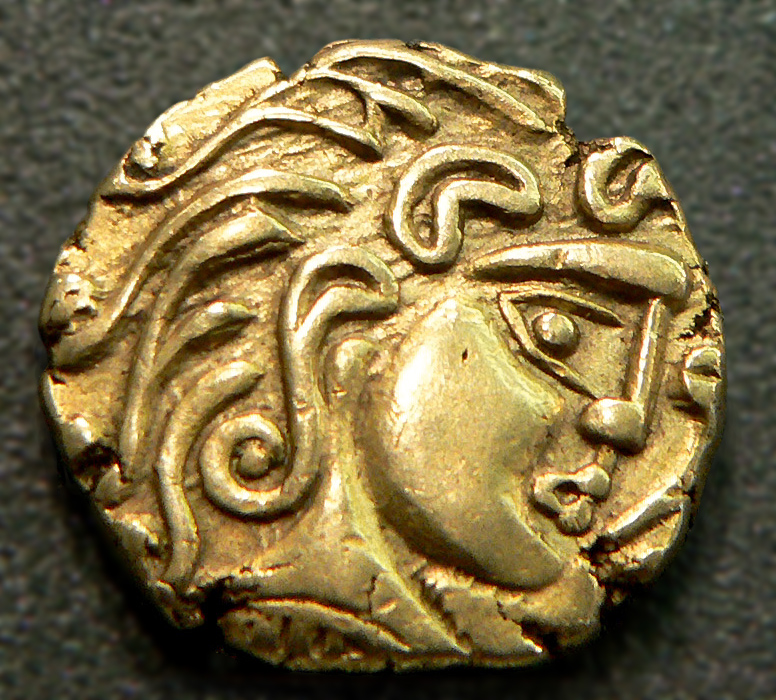
Front side of a coin

The Treasure of Puteaux is a collection of Gallic coins discovered by chance in 1950 at Puteaux, Hauts-de-Seine, France. Most of the coins are from the Parisii tribe.

The coins were discovered in November 1950, when construction was taking place to widen a street in Puteaux. At that time some workers discovered a container with many gold coins, weighing about 800 grams. The exact circumstances of the discovery remain imprecise according to the Department of Coins and Medals in France.

The collection consists of 120 coins, most of which depict the head of Apollo. This find is the largest number of Parisii coins discovered at one time, and sheds light on the history of the subject. The coins were eventually auctioned, and their prices reached records paid for Gallic coins.

== Sources ==
- Monique Mainjonet, Le Trésor de Puteaux. Revue Numismatique, VIe série, tome IV, 1962.
- Jean-Baptiste Colbert de Beaulieu, Les Monnaies gauloises des Parisii, Imprimerie nationale, 1970
- Henri de La Tour, Atlas de monnaies gauloises, préparé par la Commission de topographie des Gaules. Plon, Paris 1892.
