= Eburovices =

Gallic tribe

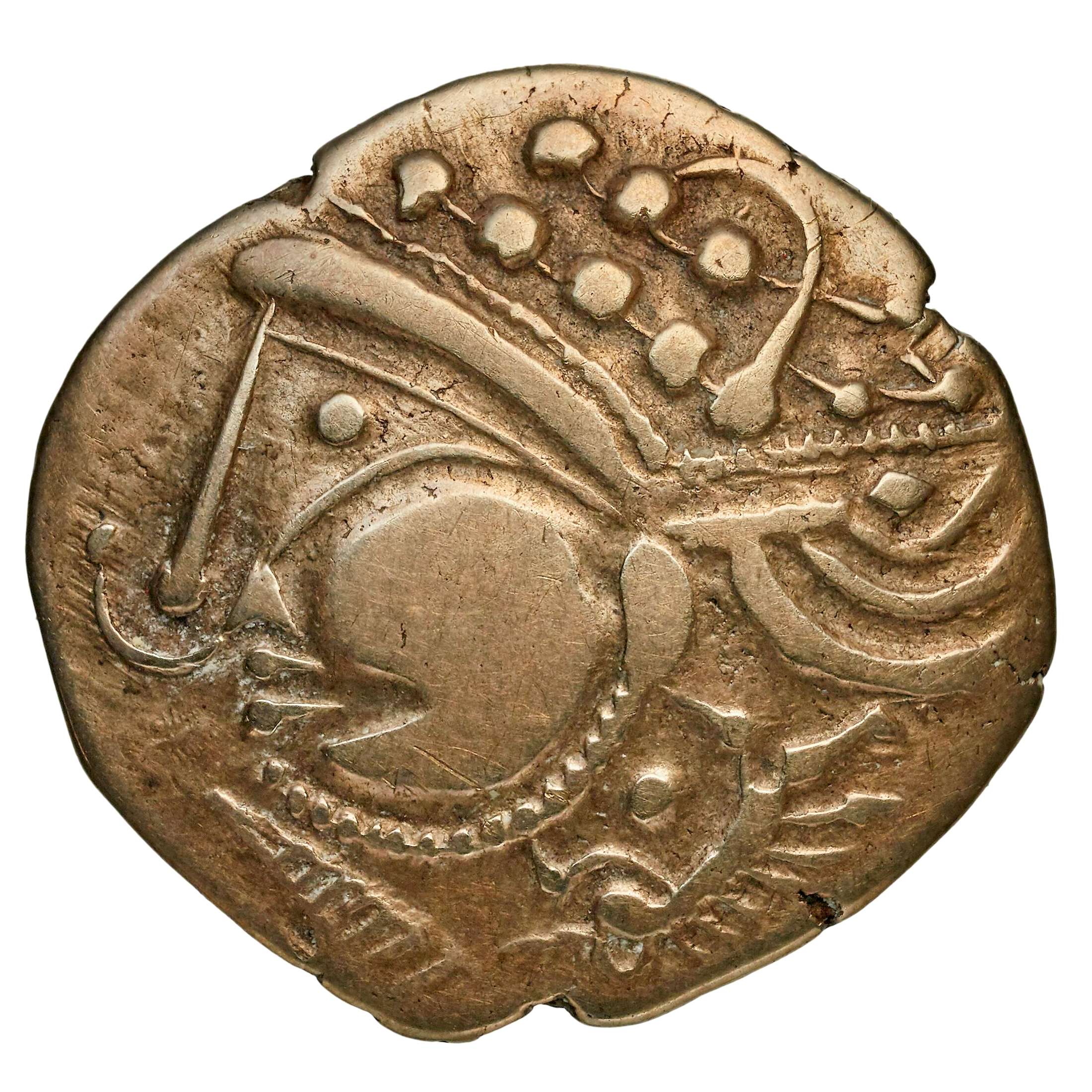
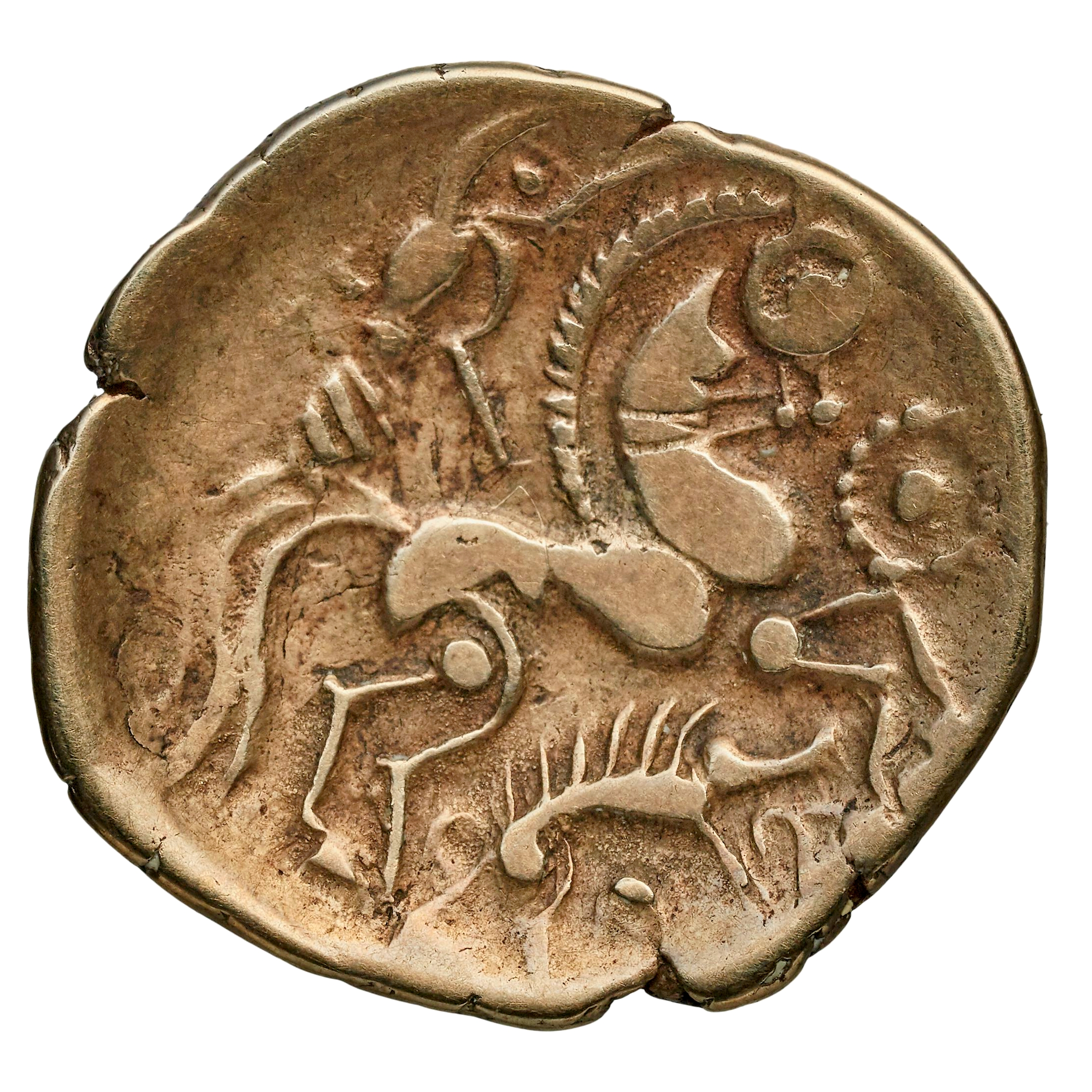
Gold hemistater of the Eburovices

The Eburovices or Aulerci Eburovices (Gaulish: *Eburouīcēs, 'those who vanquish by the yew') were a Gallic tribe dwelling in the modern Eure department during the Iron Age and the Roman period. They were part of the Aulerci.

== Name ==
They are mentioned as Aulerci Eburovices by Caesar (mid-1st c. BC), Aulerci qui cognominantur Eburovices by Pliny (1st c. AD), and as Au̓lírkioioi̔ E̓bourouikoì (Αὐλίρκιοιοἱ Ἐβουρουικοὶ) by Ptolemy (2nd c. AD).

The Gaulish ethnonym *Eburouīcēs means 'those who vanquish by the yew', probably in reference to the wood used to make their bows or spears. It stems from the root eburo- ('yew'; cf. OIr. ibar 'yew', or Middle Welsh efwr 'cow parsnip, hog-weed') attached to the suffix -uices ('combatants, victors').

Other peoples named Aulerci are also mentioned by ancient sources: the Aulerci Cenomani, Aulerci Diablintes, and Aulerci Brannovices. The relationship that linked them together remains uncertain. According to historian Venceslas Kruta, they could have been pagi that got separated from a larger ethnic group during the pre-Roman period.

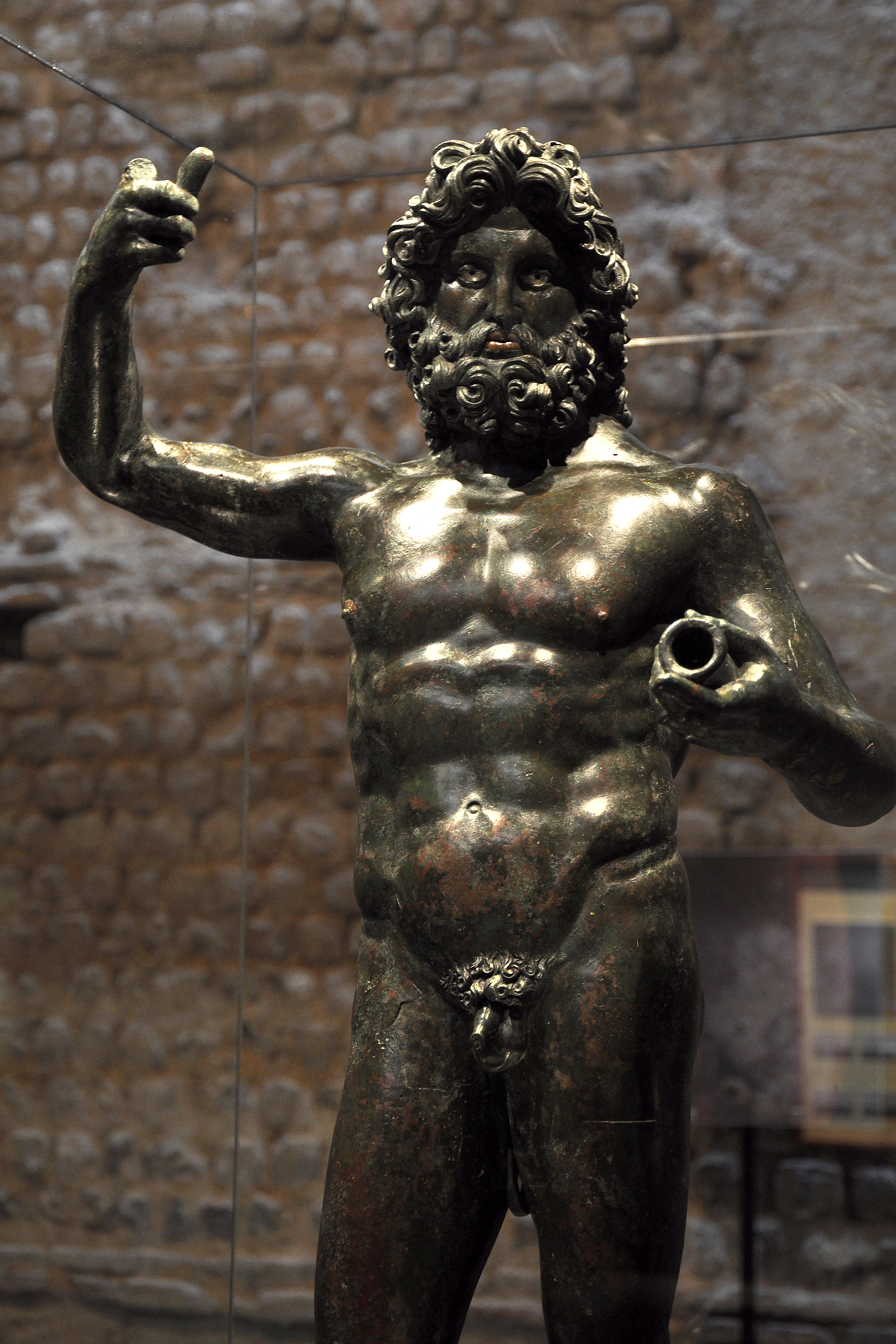
Statue of Jupiter Stator from Gisacum (Vieil-Évreux), 1st c. AD.

The city of Évreux, attested ca. 400 AD as civitas Ebroicorum ('civitas of the Eburovices'; Ebroicas in 511, Ebroas ca. 1034), is named after the tribe.

== Geography ==
During the Roman period, their chief town was Mediolanum Aulercorum (modern Évreux, in Normandy). The limits of their civitas corresponded to those of the later diocese of Évreux.

== Religion ==
A votive altar with a dedication to a deus Gisacos was found in a sanctuary at Gisacum (Le Vieil-Évreux).

[A]ug(usto) deo Gisaco/ [Ta]uricius Agri/[co]la de suo po/suit

— Le Vieil-Évreux inscription.

== See also ==
- Gallic Wars
