= Senones =

Ancient Gallic tribe

The Senones or Senonii were an ancient Gallic tribe dwelling in the Seine basin, around present-day Sens, during the Iron Age and the Roman period. The Senones remained an independent people, ruled by a king and a senate, until the Roman conquest of Gaul. They joined the revolts against Caesar, among them the rising of Vercingetorix in 52 BC. Under Roman rule they formed a civitas of Gallia Lugdunensis, and their capital Agedincum developed into the city of Sens, to which they gave their name.

A part of the people migrated to the Italian peninsula, settling on the Adriatic coast between Ariminum (modern-day Rimini) and Ancona, displacing the Umbrians. According to later Roman accounts, the Senones of Cisalpine Gaul led the Gallic war-band which defeated the Romans at the Battle of the Allia and sacked Rome around 390 BC, and were finally subjugated by Rome in 283 BC.

== Name ==
They are mentioned as Sḗnōnes (Ancient Greek: Σήνωνες) and Sḗnōnas (Σήνωνας) by Polybius (2nd century BC), Senonii by Caesar (mid-1st century BC), Sénnōnes (Σέννωνες) by Diodorus Siculus (1st century BC), Sénōnes (Σένωνες) by Strabo (early 1st century AD), Senones by Pliny (1st century AD), Sénones (Σένονες) by Ptolemy (2nd century AD), and as Senones by Ammianus (4th century AD).

The Gaulish ethnonym Senones is generally interpreted as meaning 'the ancient ones', by deriving the name from the Proto-Celtic root *sen- ('old'; cf. Old Irish sen; Middle Welsh hen 'old') extended by the suffix *-on-es. Pierre-Yves Lambert has also proposed an etymology from the root *sen(H)-, meaning 'to gain, vanquish'. In ancient times, Servius compared the name to the Greek ξενός (xenos; 'guest-friend, host, stranger').

The city of Sens, France, is attested in the 4th century AD as Senonas oppidum ('oppidum of the Senones'), is named after the Gallic tribe.

== Geography ==
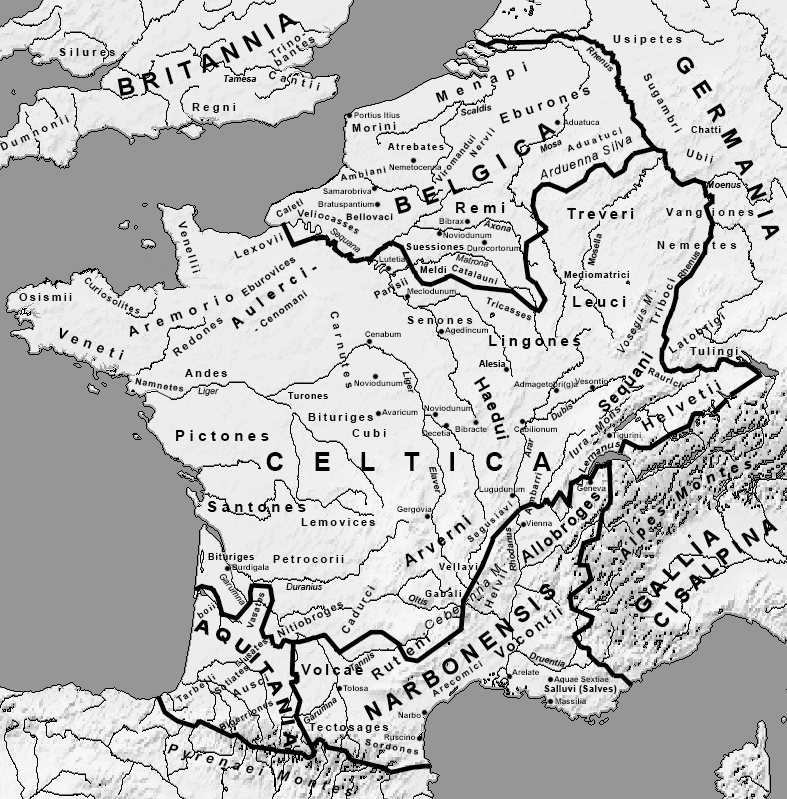
A map of Gaul in the 1st century BC, showing the relative positions of the Celtic tribes.

The Senones of Gauls dwelled around their capital Agedincum (present-day Sens), which Caesar referred to as an urbs in mid-first century BC, a term suggesting a genuine city rather than a mere settlement. Over the first centuries AD, the city's name remained in use, and inscriptions attest to its role as the civic capital. By the later 4th century, however, the name had shifted to Senonas (the origin of the modern name Sens). Under the administrative reforms of the late Roman Empire, Sens became the capital of the new province called Lugdunensis Quarta or Lugdunensis Senonia.

Their territory, whose exact boundaries have been much discussed, broadly corresponded to the ancient regions of Sénonais, Gâtinais, Melunois, Stampois, southern Brie, and Provinois. It encompassed the lower course of the Yonne River and a large segment of the Seine between modern-day Nogent and Melun. Over time, parts of this territory separated to form new cities, notably that of the Tricasses, in the area of modern Troyes.

== History ==
=== Origins ===
The Senones of the Seine basin were the parent stock of a branch that settled in Italy, the Senones of Cisalpine Gaul. The tradition for that migration is preserved chiefly by Livy, who set it in the reign of Tarquin the Elder, around 600 BC: the Biturigan king Ambigatus, whose land was overcrowded, sent his nephew Bellovesus into Italy at the head of a coalition of Gallic peoples.

The place of the Senones in this account is uncertain. The manuscripts of Livy list them among Bellovesus's followers, but editors tend to strike the name, because Livy elsewhere calls the Senones the last of the Gauls to reach Italy, the recentissimi advenarum. That tradition of a late arrival is in turn resisted on archaeological grounds. Livy's early date is generally rejected as well, having been explained as a misdating of his source, and the historical settlement of the Gauls in Italy is placed in the 4th century BC.

=== Gallic Wars ===
On the eve of the Roman conquest the Senones formed an independent people in the Seine basin, ruled by a king and possessing a senate. The Parisii, their neighbours to the northwest, had at one time been joined with them in a single state.

Moritasgus was king in 58 BC. Caesar installed Moritasgus's brother Cavarinus in his place, but the Senones later deposed and banished him. In 53 BC the noble Acco led a revolt against Roman authority. When it collapsed, Caesar had him executed at the assembly of the Gauls convened at Durocortorum.

The Senones joined the general rising led by Vercingetorix in 52 BC and supplied a contingent of 12,000 men. During the campaign Caesar took the Senonian oppidum of Vellaunodunum on his march toward Cenabum (modern Orléans). His lieutenant Labienus seized the Senonian oppidum of Metlosedum (Melun), set on an island in the Seine, and made it a base for his operations against Lutetia. After the conquest the Senones became a peregrine community subject to tribute, within the province of Gallia Lugdunensis.

=== Roman period ===
Caesar's Agedincum was an open settlement at the confluence of the Yonne and the Vanne, occupied without a break through the late La Tène period. A separate large oppidum stood about ten kilometers to the south, at "Château" in Villeneuve-sur-Yonne, but it was short-lived and did not displace the settlement at the confluence.

Around the turn of the era much of the older settlement was given up for a new foundation on the right bank of the Vanne, about one kilometer to the northeast. Its regular street grid was set out along the road from Lyon to Boulogne, the so-called Road to the Ocean, which formed the city's main axis and belonged to the network ascribed to Agrippa.

The new town developed slowly. Through the 1st century AD its buildings were mostly of earth and timber, and masonry spread only from the 120s AD, in the wealthiest houses. The grid covered around 110 hectares, but the city reached its full extent of about 220 hectares only at the end of the 2nd or the start of the 3rd century AD. The countryside followed the same rhythm. The rural population, in place before the conquest, showed little of the growth seen among the neighboring Lingones and Aedui in the 1st century AD. Substantial aristocratic villae appeared only in the 2nd and 3rd centuries.

== Economy ==
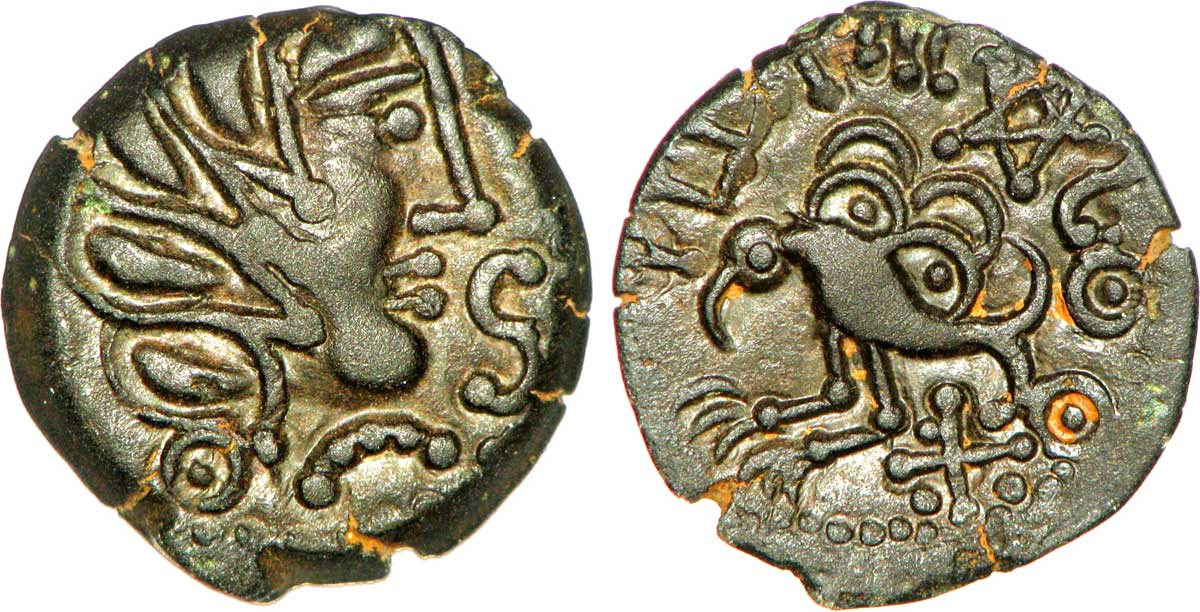
Bronze coin with a bird, struck by the Senones (c. before 52 BC)

The late La Tène settlement at the confluence was a center of craft production. Its Saint-Paul quarter has yielded traces of metalworking, pottery, and the striking of coins, including clusters of potin coins still in production.

The Senones issued their own coinage. The bronze type BN 7417 is commonly assigned to them, though the attribution is disputed, since the coins are found far beyond Senonian territory across the whole middle Seine basin. A workshop striking this type was identified at Sens, which confirms at least partial local production. A series of decorated gold globules (BN 7374–7386) is shared between the Senones and the neighboring Carnutes.

Under the Empire the craft quarters lay on the edges of the city. The pottery workshops of the Sablons quarter were active from the reign of Claudius into the 3rd century AD.

== Society ==
Senonian society is known mainly from its funerary monuments. About fifty survive, most of them of the 2nd and 3rd centuries AD, with very few earlier than the middle of the 1st century AD. They include a marked number of veterans and of freedmen, among them imperial freedmen.

The names recorded on these monuments are strongly local. About 13% are Celtic, 21% Latinized Gaulish, and 19% Latin but characteristic of the Gauls, so that more than half belong to the regional stock. Roman citizens bearing the tria nomina account for about 13% of the corpus, and few of them can be traced to the Julio-Claudian period or earlier.

The wealth of the civic elite is clearest in the city's mosaics, known from some thirty find-spots spread fairly evenly across the town. Most date to the 3rd century AD, and none has been recognised as earlier than the 2nd.
