= Blannovii =

Ancient Gallic tribe

The Blannovii were an ancient Gallic tribe.

== Name ==
They are mentioned as Blannovii by Caesar (mid-1st c. BC).

Their name may possibly be preserved in the toponym Blanot (Côte-d'Or), attested as Blaanou in 1273 AD.

Some scholars have proposed to identify them to the Aulerci Brannovices. According to Andreas Hofeneder, the name Blannovii is probably a corrupted form of Brannovices, inadvertently introduced twice into Caesar's text by later scribes as a lectio duplex (dittography).

== Geography ==
The exact location of their territory remains unclear.

Both the Aulerci Brannovices and Blannovii are traditionally located in areas bordering the territory of the Aedui, often in the Saône valley, in the Beaunois or the Mâconnais region.

== History ==
During the Gallic Wars (58–50 BC), they are mentioned by Caesar among the clients of the Aedui.
