= Parisii (Gaul) =

Gallic tribe

Location of the Parisii.

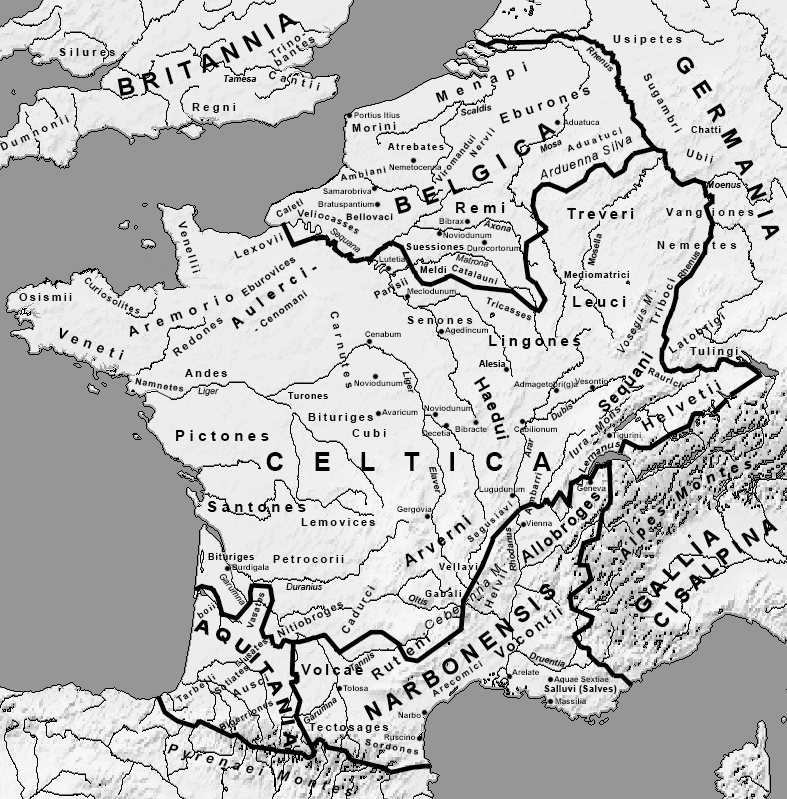
A map of Gaul in the 1st century BC, showing the relative positions of the Celtic tribes.

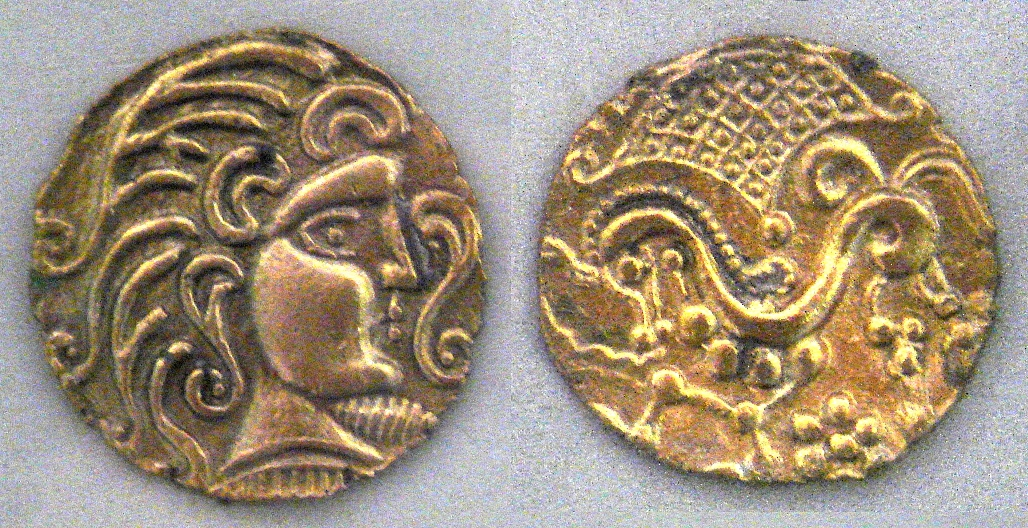
Gold coins of the Parisii, 1st century BC (Cabinet des Médailles, Paris).

The Parisii (Gaulish: *Parisioi; Greek: Παρίσιοι, romanized: Parísioi) were a Gallic tribe that dwelt on the banks of the river Seine during the Iron Age and the Roman era. They lived on lands now occupied by the modern city of Paris; that name is a derivation of their ethnonym.

== Name ==
They are mentioned as Parisii by Caesar (mid-1st c. BC), Parísioi (Παρίσιοι; var. Παρήσιοι) by Strabo (early 1st c. AD) and Ptolemy (2nd c. AD), Parisi by Pliny (mid-1st c. AD), and as Parisius and Parisios in the Notitia Dignitatum (5th c. AD). Another tribe named Parisii is also documented (with only one attestation) in Britain.

The ethnic name Parisii is a latinized form of Gaulish Parisioi (sing. Parisios). Its meaning has been debated. According to linguist Xavier Delamarre, it may derive from the stem pario- ('cauldron'). Alfred Holder interpreted the name as 'the makers' or 'the commanders', by comparing it to the Welsh peryff ('lord, commander'), both possibly descending from a Proto-Celtic form reconstructed as *kwar-is-io-. Alternatively, Pierre-Yves Lambert proposed to translate Parisii as the 'spear people', by connecting the first element to the Old Irish carr 'spear', derived from an earlier *kwar-sā.

The city of Paris, attested as Lutetiam Oppidum Parisiorum by Caesar (Parision in the 5th c. AD, Paris in 1265), is named after the Gallic tribe.

== Geography ==
Lutetia was the central oppidum of the civitas of the Parisii. It was located on an island in the Seine traditionally identified with the Île de la Cité.

The Parisii lived south of the Bellovaci, west of the Suessiones, Meldi and Senones, east of the Veliocasses and Carnutes.

Their small territory controlled major river confluences and long-distance trade routes between northern Gaul and the Mediterranean, giving their civitas significant economic leverage. Although closely linked to the neighbouring Senones and Carnutes, they appear politically autonomous at the time of the conquest: they did not join the conspiracy of 54–53 BC but chose to take part in Vercingetorix's uprising in early 52 BC.

== History ==
According to Caesar, the Parisii originally formed a single political community with the neighbouring Senones. Archaeological evidence suggests that the Parisii emerged as a distinct group during the 3rd century BC, when new cemeteries appear in the previously sparsely populated Paris basin, likely reflecting a demographic expansion. Their separation from the Senones may have resulted from this population growth. Archaeological evidence indicates that a distinct political entity had already formed by the early 2nd century BC, sustained by cultural and commercial exchanges.

In 53 BC, Lutetia is mentioned for the first time as the place where Caesar convened an assembly of the Gallic tribes. The following year, the Parisii were among the first tribes to join the general uprising of Vercingetorix against Julius Caesar. Their territory became a theatre of operations during Labienus's campaign against the Gauls, including a battle against the Aulercian commander Camulogenus, who decided to burn down Lutetia. Despite the burning of their chief town, they later contributed 8,000 men to the Gallic relief army sent to the Battle of Alesia.

Once part of the Roman Empire the Parisii oppidum later became the site of Lutetia, an important city in the Roman province of Gallia Lugdunensis, and ultimately the modern city of Paris. An ancient trade route between Germania and Hispania existed at the area, by way of the meeting of the Oise and Marne rivers with the Seine.

== See also ==
- Parisi (Yorkshire), tribe of similar name in East Yorkshire, UK, possibly associated with the Parisii of Gaul
- Treasure of Puteaux, Gallic coins discovered at Puteaux, Hauts-de-Seine, France and most of the coins are from the Parisii tribe.

== Bibliography ==
- Busse, Peter E. (2006). "Belgae". In Koch, John T. (ed.). Celtic Culture: A Historical Encyclopedia. ABC-CLIO. pp. 195–200. ISBN 978-1-85109-440-0.
- Delamarre, Xavier (2003). Dictionnaire de la langue gauloise: Une approche linguistique du vieux-celtique continental. Errance. ISBN 9782877723695.
- Falileyev, Alexander (2010). Dictionary of Continental Celtic Place-names: A Celtic Companion to the Barrington Atlas of the Greek and Roman World. CMCS. ISBN 978-0955718236.
- Ginoux, Nathalie (2017). "Organisation et structuration territoriale des Parisii continentaux. Un état de la recherche". Études celtiques. 43 (1): 7–34. doi:10.3406/ecelt.2017.1091.
- Kruta, Venceslas (2000). Les Celtes, histoire et dictionnaire. Robert Laffont. ISBN 2-221-05690-6.
- Nègre, Ernest (1990). Toponymie générale de la France. Librairie Droz. ISBN 978-2-600-02883-7.
