= Tasgetius =

Ruler of the Carnutes

Tasgetios
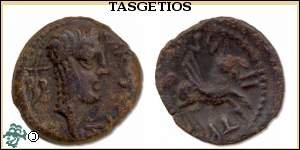
- Bronze coin bearing the name of Tasgetius

King of the Carnutes
- In office 57 BC – 54 BC

Personal details
- Born: c. 1st century BC Gaul
- Died: 54 BC Gaul
- Cause of death: Assassination
- Military career
- Allegiance: Roman Republic; Carnutes
- Service years: c. 57–54 BC
- Conflicts: Gallic Wars

Tasgetius, the Latinized form of Gaulish Tasgetios or Tasgiitios (d. 54 BC), was a ruler of the Carnutes, a Celtic polity whose territory corresponded roughly with the modern French departments of Eure-et-Loir, Loiret, and Loir-et-Cher. Julius Caesar says that as Roman proconsul he made Tasgetius king in reward for his support during the Gallic Wars. His reign would have begun in late 57 BC, following Caesar's campaign against the Belgic civitates in northern Gaul that year; it ended with his assassination in 54 BC. The overthrow of a king appointed by Caesar was one of the precipitating events that led to the pan-Gallic rebellion of 52 BC under the Arvernian leader Vercingetorix.

== Caesar's account ==
Caesar gives only a succinct account of Tasgetius's reign and death:

Tasgetius was born a man of highest rank among the Carnutes. His ancestors used to control the kingship in their country. Because of his quality as a person and his goodwill toward Caesar, and because in all his military campaigns Caesar had made use of his exceptional capability, Caesar had restored Tasgetius to his ancestral rank. In the third year of his reign, he was killed by his enemies. Many men from his own country were among the instigators, without any pretense of secrecy. These events were reported to Caesar, who was concerned, since so much was at stake, that under the influence of these men the community as a whole would defect. He ordered Lucius Plancus to take a legion and advance rapidly from Belgian territory to the Carnutes. Plancus was to establish winter quarters there and investigate the actions of those who had killed Tasgetius. These men were to be arrested and sent to Caesar.

== Political background ==
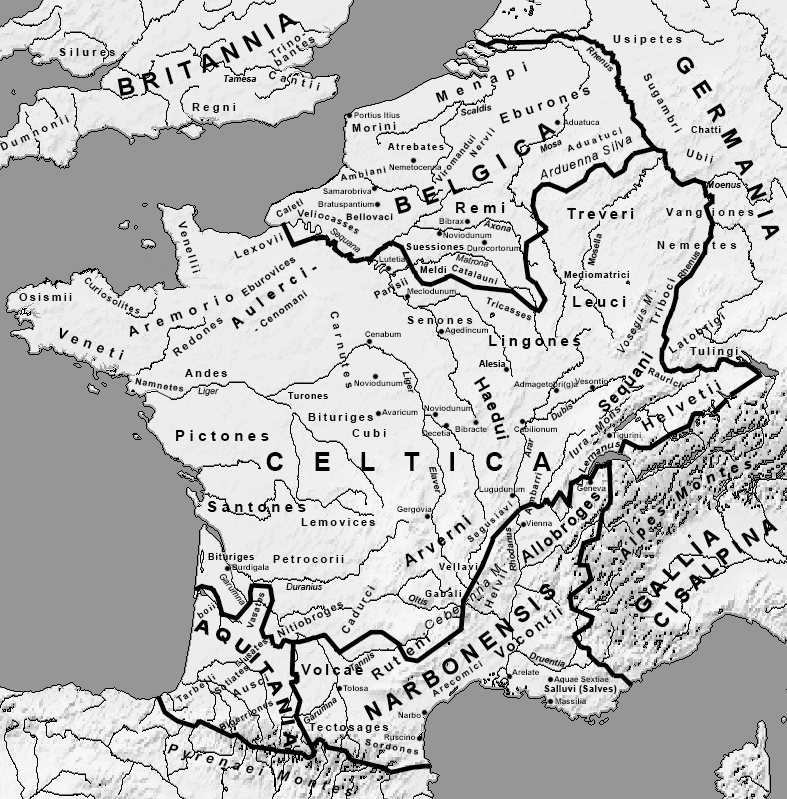
The Carnutes held territory in Celtica on both sides of the Loire River (Latin Liger)

The land of the Carnutes was regarded as the sacred center of Gaul where each year the druidry held their pan-Gallic synod. Like several other of the larger polities in Gaul, the Carnutes had once been ruled by kings, but seem to have adopted an oligarchic or proto-republican form of government. Rome often found it more convenient to deal with client states through centralizing power in a king rather than a fractious council or "senate," as Caesar often refers to such bodies on analogy with the Roman Senate. The ancestors of Tasgetius had held supreme power, and his ascent was presented as a restoration. The Carnutes had perhaps preferred not to live under a monarchy again, since Caesar's royal appointment was assassinated by his fellow citizens. Caesar attributes opposition to Tasgetius to an anti-Roman faction among the Carnutes, but it has been argued that the normal internal politics of Gaul were at play, which Caesar chose to exploit for his own purposes and propagandize as symptoms of a brewing rebellion.

Caesar says that the Carnutes were assigned to the Remi, Rome's most loyal Belgic ally, as a client state; George Long thought this was probably a consequence of Tasgetius's murder. These formal relations existed usually among contiguous polities, but the territory of the Remi (roughly modern-day Champagne) was at some remove from that of the Carnutes.

== Personal characteristics ==
Caesar acknowledged the loss of Tasgetius by taking note of the goodwill (benevolentia) he had shown the proconsul. The word benevolentia appears only twice in the Bellum Gallicum; in Book 7, Caesar insists on his own goodwill toward the Aedui, despite their having joined the opposition to Rome. In Latin usage contemporary with Caesar, the word is common in the letters and philosophical works of Cicero, who prefers it to the benignitas ("kindness") more likely to be encountered in other sources. Beneficia are kindnesses or good deeds, favors or good works; benevolentia is a cast of mind, a voluntary state of inclination that makes friendship possible. Writing about ten years after the death of Tasgetius, Cicero defines friendship as "a relationship based on agreement about all human and divine matters, together with goodwill (benevolentia) and affection." But benevolentia, as a predisposition to form social relationships, also has an inherently utilitarian side, and after noting the benevolentia of Tasgetius, Caesar immediately remarks on his usefulness (usus).

Tasgetius is one of only six individuals that Caesar praises in his Gallic war commentaries for virtus, the quality of true manhood (Latin vir, "man"), usually translated as "virtue" or "valor." The only other man from independent Gaul said to possess virtus is Commius of the Atrebates, whom Caesar also installed as king but who chose during the Gallic uprising to assert the sovereignty of his people. Although virtus is an active and potentially aggressive quality, benevolentia belongs to a class of Roman virtues characteristic of those who are kind, generous, and humane.

== Name and Celtic badger lore ==
The name Tasgetius derives from Gaulish tasgos, also tascos or taxos, "badger," an element found in many other Celtic personal names from inscriptions, such as Tascos, Tasgillus, Tassca, and Tasciovanus ("Badger Killer"), as well as in place names. Moritasgus ("Great Badger" or "Sea Badger") was the name of a ruler of the Senones contemporary with Tasgetius, and was also the name of a Celtic healing deity in territory within the Aeduan sphere of influence (see Moritasgus). Another Celtic word for "badger," broccos, also yields a number of personal and place names.

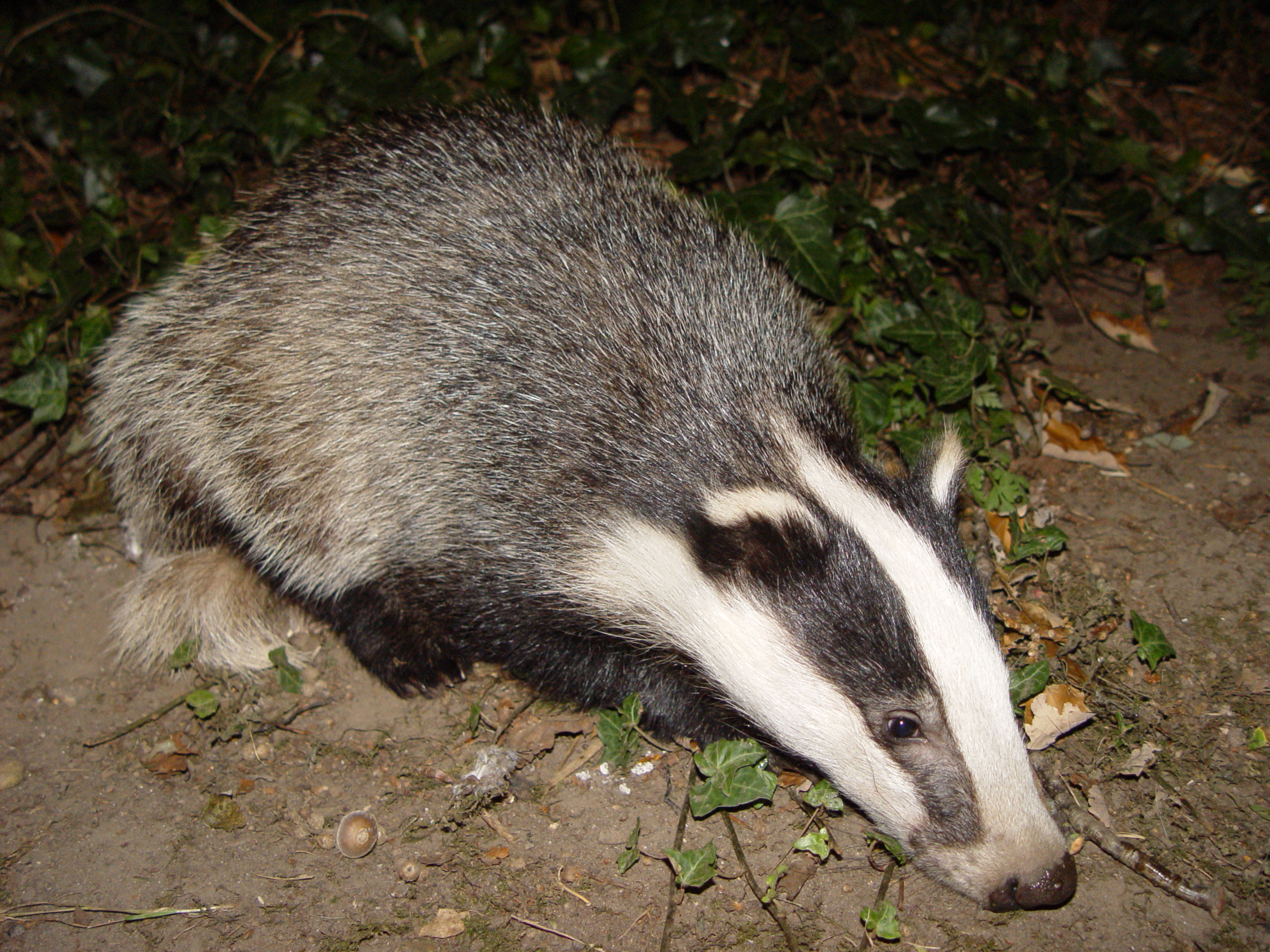
The European badger, in Gaulish tasgos: source for the pharmacological ingredient taxea

The substance taxea or adeps taxonina, "badger fat," was regarded as medically potent and traded by Germanic and Celtic peoples to the Greeks and Romans. The 4th-century medical writer Marcellus, who was from Bordeaux and whose book De medicamentis is a unique source for Gallic herbology and lore, includes badger fat as an ingredient in his pharmacological recipes. A short 5th-century treatise De taxone deals with the magico-medical properties of the badger, and prescribes the correct incantations to utter when dissecting the animal. It is perhaps a reference to the badger's medicinal or mythic properties that the Irish saint Molaise descended to hell dressed in badger skins to rescue a leper.

Although Isidore of Seville understands the word as equivalent to Latin lardum, "bacon, lard," taxea is a secretion of the badger's subcaudal glands comparable in its medicinal use to the better-known castoreum, an ingredient from the scent sacs of the beaver. Only the European species of badger possesses these subcaudal glands, which produce a pale-yellow fatty substance with a gentle musky scent. Like the beaver, the badger was regarded in the classical tradition as one of the hermaphroditic animals.

Primary among the medical uses of taxea was the treatment of impotence, which casts a different swagger on a phrase from the Latin comic poet Afranius: "The cloaked Gaul, fattened up on badger grease." The Gaulish word tasgos may be related to an Indo-European root meaning "peg, stake," because of the badger's pointed nose; it has been argued that the root can also have a phallic meaning, and that the use of taxea for impotence was thus a form of sympathetic magic.

Although its cultural significance among the Celts of Gaul is murky, the badger appears much later as a totem animal for Tadhg mac Céin, a legendary insular Celtic king whose name contains an Old Irish form for "badger." In Welsh lore, a number of games involved "playing badger," including in the first book of the Mabinogion where the game Broch ygkot ("a badger in a bag") is explained cryptically as "let him who is a head be a bridge." The narrative is presented as an aetiology of the game, involving two rivals for Rhiannon, her first husband Pwyll who carelessly loses her to Gwawl, and a magic bag that is Rhiannon's gift to Pwyll. The bag cannot be filled no matter how much food is put in it, and generosity can meet only with insatiability. Gwawl thinks that he can gain some infinite quality by climbing into the bag himself; thus captured, he receives beatings instead.

== Numismatics ==
Drawing of bronze coin issued by Tasgetius (Tasgiitios)

Tasgiitios, with the double i representing vowel lengthening, appears on numerous examples of a bronze coin assumed to be issued by Caesar's friend. The coin depicts on its obverse a crowned head of "Apollo" with a three-lobed ivy leaf, a usual symbol of Dionysus, and the name or cult title ΕΛΚΕSΟΟΥΙΞ (Elkesovix). A winged horse, usually called "Pegasus" in numismatic literature, appears on the reverse with the name Tasgiitios.

The obverse has been seen as imitating a Roman denarius of the gens Titia. Although a winged horse appeared on Celtic coins as early as the 3rd century BC, during the period 60–50 BC the Roman moneyer Quintus Titius issued a series of denarii with Pegasus on the reverse and various figures on the obverse, including Apollo, a winged Victory, and a bearded figure sometimes identified as the Roman phallic god Mutunus Tutunus. The Apollo denarius of Titius may have been the model for Tasgetius's issue, and the name Elkesovix has been interpreted as an epithet of Apollo, or as that of Tasgetius's grandfather or other ancestor. The appearance of an Apollo on the coin of the badger-named Tasgetius, and the "badger" semantic element in the name Moritasgus for a god equated with Apollo, raises the question of whether the god of healing was associated in Celtic religion and myth with an animal used in healing.

A coin of the Suessiones dated ca. 60–50 BC — that is, roughly contemporary with that of Tasgetius — also depicts a winged horse on the reverse, which appears with the name Cricironus. The profile of the helmeted head on the obverse faces left instead of right. Tasgetius's series has been studied in connection with the coins of Commius, the Atrebatan king also supported by Caesar.

A hoard discovered in 1956 at the fork of a Gallic road included coins of Tasgetius. It is estimated to have been buried in 51 BC. The coins may have been hidden by refugee Carnutes during the last campaigns of the Gallic Wars in Belgica, as narrated by Aulus Hirtius in his continuation (Book 8) of Caesar's commentaries.
