= Segovesus =

Legendary Gallic chief

Segovesus (Gaulish: 'Worthy of Victories') is a legendary Gallic chief of the Bituriges, said to have lived ca. 600 BC. According to a legend recounted by Livy, the king Ambigatus sent his sister's sons Bellovesus and Segovesus in search of new lands to settle because of overpopulation in their homeland. While Bellovesus is said to have led the Gallic invasion of northern Italy, Segovesus reportedly headed towards the Hercynian Forest, in Western Central Europe.

According to an ancient tradition, modern southern Germany was settled by Celts as a consequence of this migration. Although the historicity of this legend is highly disputed, the essence of the myth may have been based on actual events, for migrations actually occurred towards Bohemia and bordering regions of Central Europe during the first quarter of the 4th century BC.

== Etymology ==
The Gaulish personal name Sego-uesus literally means 'worthy of victories'. It is made up of the prefix sego- ('strength, victory') attached to uesus, meaning 'worthy, good, deserving', itself from Proto-Celtic *wesus ('excellent, noble'; cf. Old Irish feib 'in excellence', fó 'goodness', Welsh gwiw 'worthy, valuable').

== Story ==
The legend is recounted by the Roman historian Livy in his Ab Urbe Condita Libri, written in the late 1st century BC:

... Gaul under [Ambigatus'] sway grew so rich in corn and so populous, that it seemed hardly possible to govern so great a multitude. The king, who was now an old man and wished to relieve his kingdom of a burdensome throng, announced that he meant to send Bellovesus and Segovesus, his sister's sons, two enterprising young men, to find such homes as the gods might assign to them by augury; and promised them that they should head as large a number of emigrants as they themselves desired, so that no tribe might be able to prevent their settlement. Whereupon to Segovesus were by lot assigned the Hercynian highlands; but to Bellovesus the gods proposed a far pleasanter road, into Italy.

— Livy 2019. Ab Urbe Condita Libri, 5.34.

== See also ==
- Hercynian Forest
