= Bellovesus =

Legendary Gallic chief

Bellovesus (Gaulish: 'Worthy of Power') is a legendary Gallic chief of the Bituriges, said to have lived c. 600 BC. According to a legend recounted by Livy, the king Ambigatus sent his sister's sons Bellovesus and Segovesus in search of new lands to settle because of overpopulation in their homeland. While Segovesus headed towards the Hercynian Forest, Bellovesus is said to have led the Gallic invasion of the Po Valley during the legendary reign of the fifth king of Rome, Tarquinius Priscus (616–579 BC), where he allegedly conquered the Etruscans and founded the city of Mediolanum (Milan).

== Etymology ==
The Gaulish personal name Bello-uesus literally means 'Worthy of Power'. It is formed with the stem bello- ('strong, powerful') attached to uesus, meaning 'worthy, good, deserving', itself from Proto-Celtic *wesus ('excellent, noble'; cf. Old Irish feib 'in excellence', OIr. fó 'goodness', OIr. fíu, Welsh gwiw 'worthy, valuable').

== Origin ==
Although the background of the story is anachronistic, for the historical Celtic invasion of the Italian Peninsula occurred between the end of the 5th century and the middle of the 4th century BC, in the context of the Battle of the Allia (387 BC), the essence of the myth was most likely inspired by actual events. According to historian Venceslas Kruta, the story of Bellovesus "is probably the legendary construction of a 'myth of origins', likely Insubrian, which integrates various elements borrowed from Celtic, Cisalpine and Transalpine traditions, as well as Massaliote and Etrusco-Italian." The Gallic tribes mentioned in the legend were probably arranged freely out of names current at the time of Livy in the late 1st century BC.

== Story ==
The Roman historian Livy mentioned that he was the son of the sister of the king Ambicatus. His family belonged to the tribe of Bituriges, then the most powerful Gallic people. At that time, the Bituriges were suffering from overpopulation, so it became necessary to open new settlement areas. Bellovesus and his brother Segovesus were entrusted with this task:

Whereupon to Segovesus were by lot assigned the Hercynian highlands; but to Bellovesus the gods proposed a far pleasanter road, into Italy. Taking out with him the surplus population of his tribes, the Bituriges, Arverni, Senones, Haedui, Ambarri, Carnutes, and Aulerci, he marched with vast numbers of infantry and cavalry into the country of the Tricastini.

— Livy 2019. Ab Urbe Condita Libri, 5.34.

The Alps represented an insurmountable hurdle since no road had been built across them yet. Only after they gave support to the Greeks, who in the area of the Salyes had landed and established ca. 600 BC the colony of Massalia (Marseille), did Bellovesus and his followers succeed in crossing the mountain range through Taurine passes and the pass of the Duria. Having arrived in Italy, the Gauls defeated the Etruscans near the Ticino River, then settled in an area later called Insubria and, according to Livy, "bore the same name as an Haeduan canton". Here, Bellovesus decided to build a new city and to call it Medhelanon, later Latinized by the ancient Romans into Mediolanum, the modern Milan.

Another group made up of Cenomani and led by Etitovius followed their track and, with the approval of Bellovesus, crossed the Alps by the same pass before settling around the present-day cities of Brescia and Verona. They were followed by the coming of Libui, Salyes, Boii, and Lingones in the Po Valley, driving both the Etruscans and Umbrians away from their lands.

== See also ==
- Cisalpine Gaul
- Insubres
