= Brannovices =

Gallic tribe

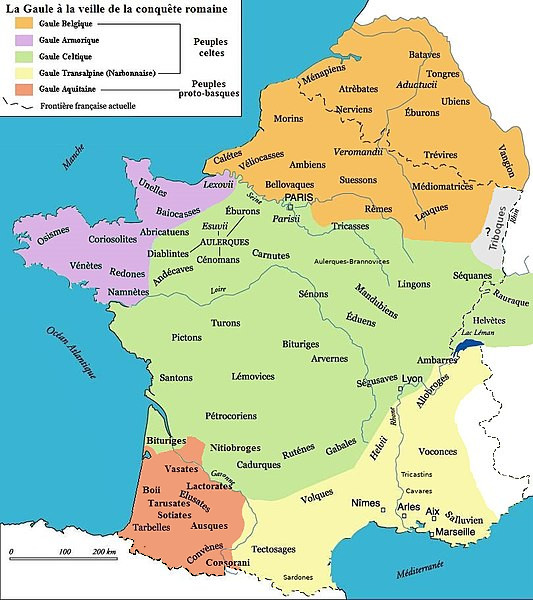
Map of the Gallic peoples (in French). The Aulerci (‘Aulerques’) are shown in the north of the green area, to the north of the Loire river.

The Brannovices or Aulerci Brannovices (Gaulish: *Brannouīcēs) were a Gallic tribe living in the Saône valley or south of the modern Yonne department before the Roman period. They were part of the Aulerci.

== Name ==
They are mentioned as Aulercis Brannovicibus by Caesar (mid-1st c. BC). They may be the same people as the Blannovii mentioned in the same passage by Caesar. According to Andreas Hofeneder, the name Blannovii is probably a corrupted form of Brannovices, inadvertently introduced twice into Caesar's text by later scribes as a lectio duplex (dittography).

The Gaulish tribal name *Brannouīcēs means 'those who vanquish by (or like) the crow'. It stems from the root brano- ('crow', cf. OIr., Welsh bran) attached to the suffix -uices ('victors').

Other peoples named Aulerci are also mentioned by ancient sources: the Aulerci Cenomani, Aulerci Diablintes, and Aulerci Eburovices. The relationship that linked them together remains uncertain. According to historian Venceslas Kruta, they could have been pagi that got separated from a larger ethnic group during the pre-Roman period.

== Geography ==
Both the Aulerci Brannovices and Blannovii are traditionally located in areas bordering the territory of the Aedui, often in the Saône valley, in the Beaunois or the Mâconnais region. Kruta also mentions a possible location south of the modern Yonne department.

== History ==
During the Gallic Wars (58–50 BC), they are mentioned by Caesar among the clients of the Aedui.
