= Bituriges Cubi =

Gallic tribe

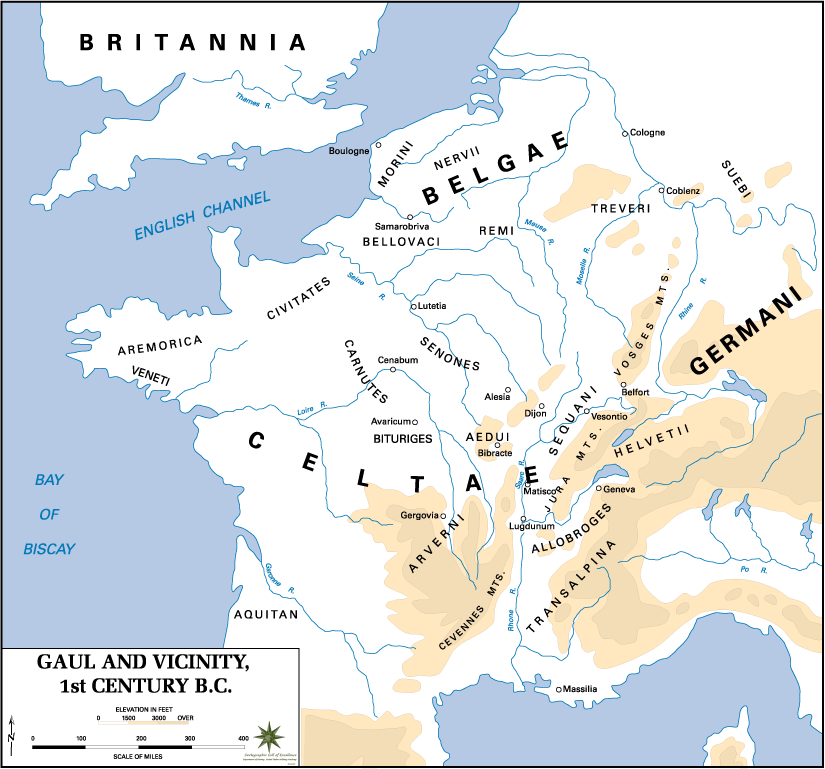
A map of Gaul in the 1st century BC, showing the relative positions of the Celtic tribes. The term Germani (Germania = the fertile land) is a description of territory populated by various ethnicities - not of a tribe.

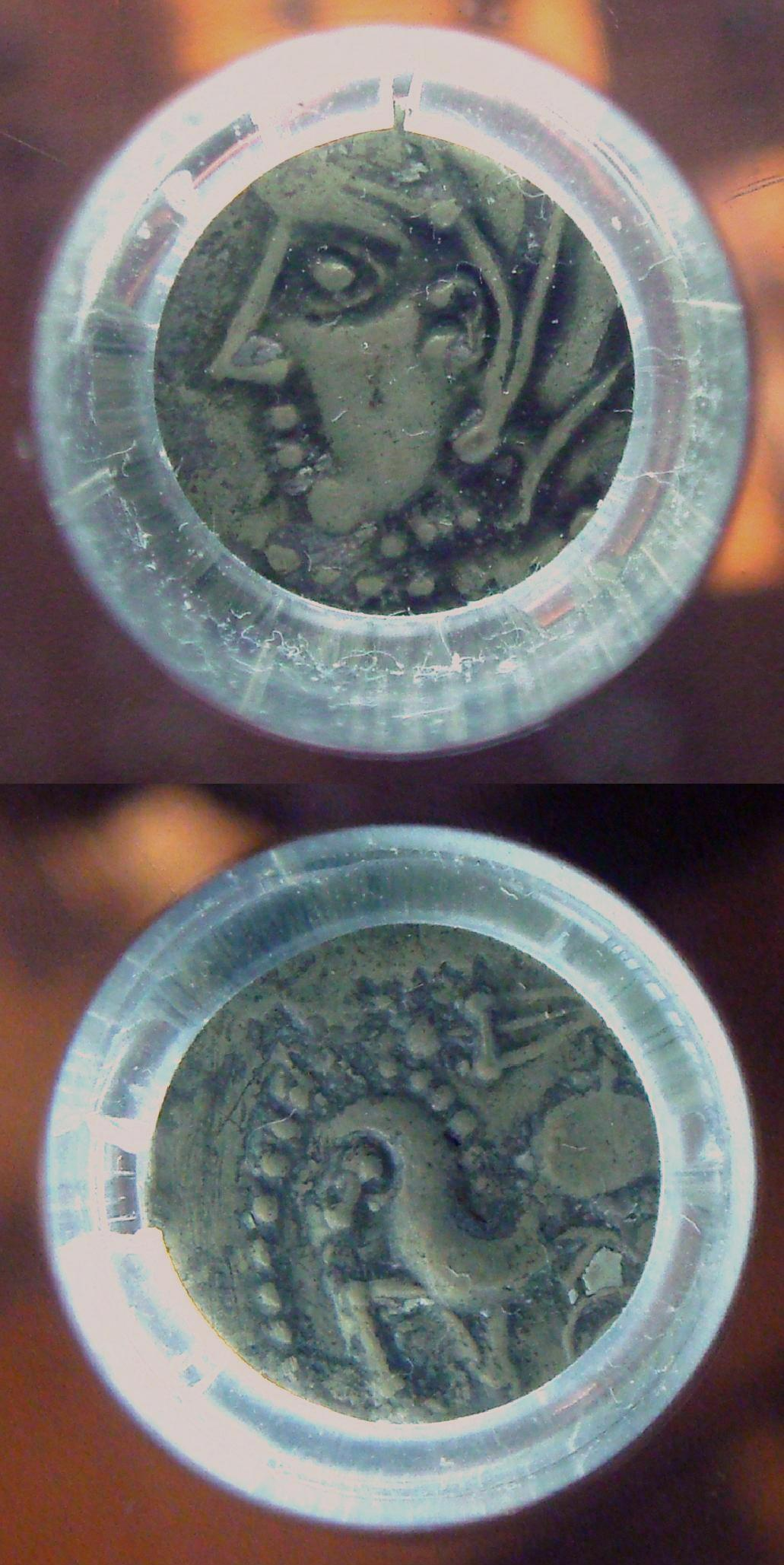
Silver denier of the Bituriges Cubi, 1780 mg. Hotel de la Monnaie.

The Bituriges Cubi (Gaulish: Biturīges Cubi) were a Gallic tribe dwelling in a territory corresponding to the later province of Berry, which is named after them, during the Iron Age and the Roman period. They had a homonym tribe, the Bituriges Vivisci, in the Bordelais region, which could indicate a common origin, although there is no direct evidence of this.

== Name ==
They are mentioned as Bituriges by Caesar (mid-1st c. BC), Bitoúriges oi̔ Kou͂boi (Βιτούριγες οἱ Κοῦβοι) and Koúbois Bitoúrixi (Κούβοις Βιτούριξι) by Strabo (early 1st c. AD), Bituriges ... qui Cubi appellantur by Pliny (1st c. AD), and as Bitoúriges oi̔ Kou͂boi (Βιτούριγες οἱ Κοῦβοι) by Ptolemy (2nd c. AD).

The Gaulish ethnonym Biturīges means 'kings of the world', or possibly 'perpetual kings'. It derives from the stem bitu- ('world', perhaps also 'perpetual'; cf. OIr. bith 'world, life, age', bith- 'eternally', Old Welsh bid 'world') attached to riges ('kings'). Whether the meaning 'perpetual' was already associated with bitu- in ancient Celtic languages or appeared later in Old Irish remains uncertain. In any case, the Celtic meaning 'world' probably emerged from the notion of 'living world, place of the livings', since *bitu- derives from Proto-Indo-European *gʷiH-tu-, meaning 'life'.

The city of Bourges, attested ca. 400 AD as civitas Biturigum ('civitas of the Bituriges', Bituricas in 844, Bituris in 1182), and the region of Berry, attested in 860 as pagus Biturigus ('pagus of the Bituriges'), are named after the Gallic tribe.

The same name was borne by the Bituriges Vivisci of southwestern Gaul. Venceslas Kruta sees this homonymy as a possible sign of shared origin. Michel Bats cautions that a shared ethnonym alone does not necessarily point to a common origin or to any movement of population, since a prestige self-designation such as 'kings of the world' could be taken up independently by unrelated peoples.

== Geography ==
Their chief town during the pre-Roman era was the oppidum of Avaricum Biturigum (modern Bourges). Their dwelled west of the Aedui, south of the Carnutes and Cenomani, north of the Pictones, Lemovices and Arverni, and east of the Turones.

== History ==
According to a legend recounted by Livy, the Bituriges ruled over all of Gaul ca. 600 BC. Faced with overpopulation in their homeland, the Biturigian king Ambigatus sent his sister's sons Bellovesus and Segovesus in search of new territories to settle. Segovesus headed towards the Hercynian Forest, while Bellovesus is said to have led the Gallic invasion of northern Italy.

While Tarquinius Priscus reigned at Rome, the Celts, who make up one of the three divisions of Gaul, were under the domination of the Bituriges, and this tribe supplied the Celtic nation with a king. Ambigatus was then the man, and his talents, together with his own and the general good fortune, had brought him great distinction; for Gaul under his sway grew so rich in corn and so populous, that it seemed hardly possible to govern so great a multitude.

— Livy 2019. Ab Urbe Condita Libri, 5.34.

Many Greek ceramics and amphoras imported from Massalia, as well as local productions of fine art pottery dated to the second part of the 6th century BC were found on the site Bourges, which, according to historian Venceslas Kruta, gives archeological credit to the essence of the tradition reported by Livy evoking the power of the people of the region well before his own time.

In the 1st century BC, the Bituriges Cubi were client of the Aedui as part of their confederation headed. During the Gallic Wars, they supported the Arverni in their fight against Caesar, and suffered great losses in the siege of their oppidum named Noviodunum, followed by their chief town Avaricum in 52 BC, the only oppidum in their territory spared by the scorched-earth tactics of Vercingetorix. They also took part in the defence of Alesia during the siege of the oppidum by the Romans. After the defeat of Vercingetorix, Rome had to suppress a Gallic revolt in the territory of the Bituriges in 51 BC. Their submission to Rome was reportedly quick, and they asked Caesar to intervene against their neighbours the Carnutes only a few weeks later.

== Legacy ==
A passage from Livy, summa imperii penes Biturges ('all the power in the hands of the Bituriges'), has become the motto of the city of Bourges.

== See also ==
- List of peoples of Gaul
- Saint-Benoît-du-Sault

== Primary sources ==
- Livy (2019). History of Rome. Loeb Classical Library. Translated by Yardley, J. C. Harvard University Press. ISBN 978-0674992566.

=== Bibliography ===
- Bats, Michel (2005). "Strabon, les Bituriges Vivisques et l'Aquitaine de César et d'Auguste". In Bouet, Alain; Verdin, Florence (eds.). Territoires et paysages de l'âge du Fer au Moyen Âge: Mélanges offerts à Philippe Leveau. Mémoires. Vol. 16. Bordeaux: Ausonius Éditions. pp. 13–17. ISBN 978-2-910023-65-2.
- Busse, Peter E.; Koch, John T. (2006). "Biturīges". In Koch, John T. (ed.). Celtic Culture: A Historical Encyclopedia. ABC-CLIO. ISBN 978-1-85109-440-0.
- Delamarre, Xavier (2003). Dictionnaire de la langue gauloise: Une approche linguistique du vieux-celtique continental. Errance. ISBN 9782877723695.
- Falileyev, Alexander (2010). Dictionary of Continental Celtic Place-names: A Celtic Companion to the Barrington Atlas of the Greek and Roman World. CMCS. ISBN 978-0955718236.
- Kruta, Venceslas (2000). Les Celtes, histoire et dictionnaire : des origines à la romanisation et au christianisme. Robert Laffont. ISBN 2-221-05690-6.
- Lambert, Pierre-Yves (1994). La langue gauloise: description linguistique, commentaire d'inscriptions choisies. Errance. ISBN 978-2-87772-089-2.
- Matasović, Ranko (2009). Etymological Dictionary of Proto-Celtic. Brill. ISBN 9789004173361.
- Nègre, Ernest (1990). Toponymie générale de la France. Librairie Droz. ISBN 978-2-600-02883-7.
