= Ariolica (Alpes Graiae) =

Ariolica was an ancient station and village on the road over the Graian Alps (Alpes Graiae), immediately at the foot of the passage of the mountain itself. The Tabula, in which alone the name occurs, places it 6 M. P. (9 km) from the station on the summit of the pass (in Alpe Graia), and 16 from Arebrigium (modern Pré-Saint-Didier, Aosta Valley, Italy); but this last distance is greatly overstated, and should certainly be corrected into 6, as the distances in the Table would in this case coincide with those in the Antonine Itinerary, which gives 24 miles in all from Arebrigium to Bergintrum (modern Bourg-Saint-Maurice, Savoie, France), and this is just about the truth. Ariolica probably occupied the same site as La Thuile, Italy in the first little plain or opening of the valley which occurs on the descent into Italy. The name is erroneously given as Artolica in the older editions of the Tabula, but the original has Ariolica.
