= Fustuarium =

Roman military execution method

In the military of ancient Rome, fustuarium (Greek ξυλοκοπία, xylokopia) or fustuarium supplicium ("the punishment of cudgeling") was a severe form of military discipline in which a soldier was cudgeled to death.

It is described by the Greek historian Polybius in a passage observing that Roman soldiers were motivated to stand fast and maintain their posts by the fear of harsh punishments such as public disgrace, flogging, and death. As a form of discipline imposed on a soldier, fustuarium thus reflected Roman doubts that courage alone was sufficient to ensure the steadfastness of the average soldier—an awareness that Julius Caesar shows in his war commentaries.

Fustuarium was the penalty when a sentry deserted his post and for stealing from one's fellow soldiers in camp. A soldier who committed an act of theft (furtum) against civilians by contrast had his right hand cut off. The fustuarium was also the punishment for falsifying evidence and lying under oath, or for committing the same offence three times.

It is sometimes thought that homosexuality incurred this punishment, but Polybius refers only to "adult men who have abused their persons".

All the behaviors punishable by the fustuarium—desertion, stealing, false witness, sexual misconduct and repeating three times a same offense—thus violate trust (fides) among fellow soldiers, and the cudgeling was administered communally.

Fustuarium was inflicted on a single soldier who committed an offense, and thereby differs from decimatio, when a unit that had mutinied or disgraced itself by cowardice was compelled to randomly select every tenth man and stone, club or stab him to death by their own hands. The distinction between fustuarium and decimatio, however, may be illusory and is difficult to discern in passing references by literary sources.

Fustuarium is a strikingly archaic form of punishment at odds with Roman legal practice in the historical era; stoning was also alien to the Romans, except in a military setting, perhaps suggesting the conservatism of martial tradition. Fustuarium may have originated as a religious rite of purification by means of which the unit purged itself through something like a scapegoat or pharmakos ritual. Germanicus, for instance, permitted mutinous soldiers to butcher their leaders to clear themselves of their guilt.

Fustuarium in combination with decimatio is relatively rare in the historical record. Incidents include Marcus Crassus, punishing forces defeated by Spartacus early in his command of the war; Apronius, deserters against Tacfarinas; and four occasions during the civil wars between 49 and 34 BC.

== See also ==
- Roman military decorations and punishments
- Running the gauntlet
