= Ambicatus =

Legendary Gallic king

Ambicatus or Ambigatus (Gaulish: 'He who fights in both directions') is a legendary Gallic king of the Bituriges, said to have lived ca. 600 BC. According to a legend recounted by Livy, he sent his sister's sons Bellovesus and Segovesus in search of new lands to settle because of overpopulation in their homeland. Segovesus headed towards the Hercynian Forest, while Bellovesus is said to have led the Gallic invasion of the Po Valley during the legendary reign of the fifth king of Rome, Tarquinius Priscus (616–579 BC), where he allegedly conquered the Etruscans and founded the city of Mediolanum (Milan).

== Name ==
The Gaulish personal name Ambigatus is a variant form of an earlier Ambicatus, meaning 'the one who fights in both directions'. It is a compound formed with the root ambi- ('around, on both sides') attached to -catu- ('combat, battle'). Peter E. Busse and John T. Koch note that Gaulish names that entered Latin through the Etruscan language often show this confusion between /k/ and /g/, since Etruscan did not distinguish between the two sounds (e.g. Lat. gladius < Gaul. *cladios).

== Origin ==
Although the background of the story is anachronistic, for the historical Celtic invasion of the Italian Peninsula occurred between the end of the 5th century and the middle of the 4th century BC, in the context of the Battle of the Allia (387 BC), the essence of the myth was most likely inspired by actual events. Many Greek ceramics and amphoras imported from Massalia, as well as local productions of fine art pottery dated to the second part of the 6th century BC were found on the site of Bourges, which, according to historian Venceslas Kruta, gives archeological credit to the essence of the tradition reported by Livy evoking the power of the people of the region well before his own time. Kruta further contends that the story "is probably the legendary construction of a 'myth of origins', likely Insubrian, which integrates various elements borrowed from Celtic, Cisalpine and Transalpine traditions, as well as Massaliote and Etrusco-Italian."

== Story ==
The legend is recounted by the Roman historian Livy in his Ab Urbe Condita Libri, written in the late 1st century BC:

While Tarquinius Priscus reigned at Rome, the Celts, who make up one of the three divisions of Gaul, were under the domination of the Bituriges, and this tribe supplied the Celtic nation with a king. Ambigatus was then the man, and his talents, together with his own and the general good fortune, had brought him great distinction; for Gaul under his sway grew so rich in corn and so populous, that it seemed hardly possible to govern so great a multitude. The king, who was now an old man and wished to relieve his kingdom of a burdensome throng, announced that he meant to send Bellovesus and Segovesus, his sister's sons, two enterprising young men, to find such homes as the gods might assign to them by augury; and promised them that they should head as large a number of emigrants as they themselves desired, so that no tribe might be able to prevent their settlement. Whereupon to Segovesus were by lot assigned the Hercynian highlands; but to Bellovesus the gods proposed a far pleasanter road, into Italy.

— Livy 2019. Ab Urbe Condita Libri, 5.34.
