= Saint-Martin-au-Val Sanctuary =

Gallo-Roman Sanctuary

Saint-Martin-au-Val
- Location within France
- 48°26′17″N 1°29′45″E
- Type: Gallo-Roman Sanctuary
- Periods: Classical Antiquity
- Cultures: Carnutes, Gallo-Roman
- Location: Chartres, France
- Region: Centre-Val de Loire

History
- Built: 1st century CE
- Abandoned: 2nd century CE

Site notes
- Material: White limestone, marble
- Elevation: 130 m (430 ft)
- Area: 6 ha (15 acres)
- Excavation dates: 2006 – present
- Condition: Ruined
- Public access: Yes

The Saint-Martin-au-Val Sanctuary is a monumental Gallo-Roman temple complex still undergoing excavation in Chartres. It is one of the largest sanctuaries from Roman Gaul and is notable for its rare preservation of an ornate wooden ceiling. It featured a cult site to Diana and Apollo.

== Location ==
The sanctuary is part of the monumental complex known today as Saint-Martin-au-Val, which lay outside the limits of the ancient city of Autricum, in modern-day Chartres. It is beneath what is now the Saint-Brice district. Autricum was a principle settlement in the territory of the Carnutes.

The site was a swamp that fell within the floodplain of the river Eure at the time construction originally began. Workers raised and cleared the low-lying wetland with thousands of tons of backfill from nearby quarries.

== Architecture ==
=== Main Sanctuary ===
The massive sanctuary forms a quadriporticus 6 hectares (200 by 300 m) in size. The inner courtyard is 4.5 hectares, enclosed by walls and galleries with a pavilion at each of the four corners. The exterior facade is punctuated with alternating rectangular exedras and semi-circular apses, with the northern exedra providing direct access to the pavilion.

A temple is built in the center of the western facade while the eastern facade featured a monumental fountain.

What remains of the temple's floor is white limestone. The remaining base of the walls is marble, with elevations indicating decorated frescoes or sculpted stone patterns.

=== Wooden ceiling ===
More than 1,500 pieces of building 2's painted and engraved wooden ceiling have been uncovered at the site. The wood has been preserved by first being charred and hardened in a fire from building 2 being razed, after which it was extinguished and submerged when it fell into the white marble basin of a monumental fountain. Flooding from the Eure helped to seal the wood in sustainable conditions for its preservation.

The wood, along with the fountain that preserved it, dates to the first half of the 2nd century. The large pieces recovered so far are the beams, joists, and planks of a hexagonal coffered ceiling. 90% of the structural elements are constructed from fir wood and 10% from oak, while the decorations are sculpted in linden. The decorations include sculpted acanthus leaves, ovals, spearheads, rais-de-cœurs, as well as pearls and pirouettes

This is one of only two instances of such significant amounts of wooden architecture surviving from antiquity, offering a rare glimpse into joinery techniques and other wood craftsmanship from the period.

=== Additional structures ===
Outside the sanctuary walls, a series of structures extends the religious complex towards the river valley. One such religious structure, excavated in 2013, is an approximately square temple (fanum) that was built on an older gallery that had been refitted several times. Built on a high podium, only the base of its walls and parts of the floor remain. Its facade features eight columns and opens the central room (cella) towards the Eure.

The floor of the building was paved with limestone and its walls decorated with colored rock. Either an altar or idol of the god worshiped there occupied the back of the cella.

== History ==
Ground broke on construction of the sanctuary sometime around 70-80 CE. The rectangular and semi-circular rooms (exedra and apses) along the facade appeared half a century later. In the northeast portion that has been studied so far, construction seemingly ground to a premature halt by 130. The absence of wall lighting and painted plaster, the scarcity of roofing elements, as well as some major defects, suggest the sanctuary complex had possibly not even started to function. That part of the building appears to have been totally abandoned from that point until the early decades of the 3rd century, when plundering for materials began. This abandonment and decline took place quite early compared to similar major temple sites. A century later, lime kilns were installed at the site.

The fanum outside of the sanctuary was built and demolished at around the same time as the sanctuary itself. Fragments of statues found outside the fanum indicate that Diana and Apollo were worshiped there.

By the 3rd century, the religious purpose of the sanctuary had changed. A large recovery pit outside the north-eastern corner pavilion was the burial site of more than one hundred bodies between 270 and 280 CE, thought to have died in an epidemic. People of all ages were buried along with domestic artifacts like game tokens, dishes, ornaments, and pottery, as well as with animal remains.

The fire that burned the wooden ceiling of building 2 probably took place at the end of the 3rd century or beginning of the 4th. The fire was set to eliminate vegetation that had overgrown the site so that the masonry could be plundered for reuse.

== Archaeology ==
Research has been conducted by the municipal archaeological service of the city of Chartres since 2006, with excavations focusing primarily on the north-east corner of the site so far. The site receives benefits such as annual grants to support its research, after interest led to it getting programmed by the Ministry of Culture in 2011.

== Bibliography ==
- Bazin, Bruno; Hérouin, Stéphane; Joly, Dominique (2014). "Démantèlement et Abandon Précoce d'un Grand Sanctuaire à Chartres/Autricum". Gallia (in French). 71 (1): 13–24. JSTOR 43608974.
- Bazin, Bruno (2017). "Chartres – Sanctuaire de Saint-Martin-au-Val : Fouille programmée (2017)". ADLFI. Archéologie de la France - Informations (in French). 28 (2017). OpenEdition Journals.
- Pichon, Blaise (2018). "La fin des cultes et des sanctuaires païens urbains en Belgique et en Lyonnaise (IIIe s. – début du Ve s. apr. J.- C.)". Revue de l'histoire des religions (in French). 2 (2018). OpenEdition Journals.

=== External links ===
- "Le sanctuaire gallo-romain". archeologie.chartres.fr (in French). Archéo ville de Chartres.
- "Patrimoine: Les archéologues proposent, pour la première fois, des visites du bassin du temple d'Apollon à Chartres". lechorepublicain.fr (in French). L'écho républicain. September 18, 2020.
- "Archéologie: Ce qu'ont découvert les archéologues sur les vestiges en bois exceptionnels du site de Saint-Martin-au-Val à Chartres". lechorepublicain.fr (in French). L'écho républicain. September 27, 2021.
- "Le sanctuaire de Saint-Martin-au-Val (28) en 3D". culture.gouv.fr (in French). Ministère de la culture. January 31, 2013.
