= Carnutes =

Ancient Gaulish people

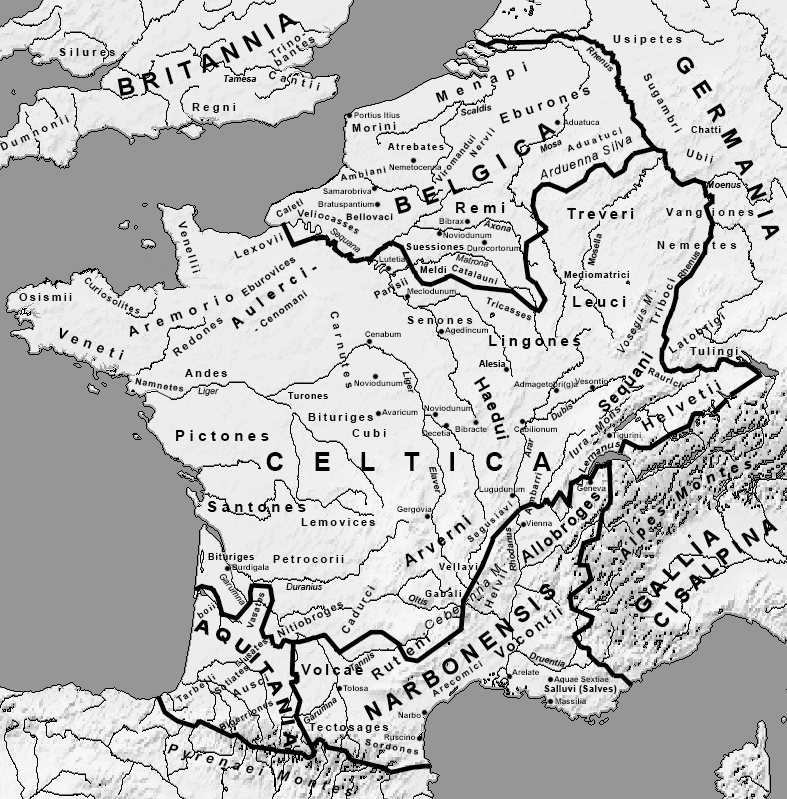
Map of Gaul with tribes, 1st century BC; the Carnutes are circled.

The Carnutes were a Gallic people whose territory lay in the middle Loire basin, in what is now the Centre-Val de Loire region of France. Their land held two principal centres, Cenabum (Orléans) and Autricum (Chartres), and archaeology shows a civitas organised around two distinct cultural poles from the 2nd century BC. Caesar placed among the Carnutes the annual assembly of the druids, held at a consecrated place in what he reckoned to be the centre of Gaul. The great revolt of 52 BC broke out in their chief town of Cenabum, where the Carnutes killed the Roman traders settled there.

== Name ==
They are mentioned as Carnutes by Caesar (mid-1st c. BC) and Livy (late-1st c. BC), Carnūti by Tibullus (late-1st c. BC), Karnoútōn (Καρνούτων) and Karnoúntōn (Καρνούντων) by Strabo (early 1st c. AD), Karnoũtai (Καρνοῦται) by Ptolemy (2nd c. AD), and as Carnunta in the Notitia Dignitatum (5th c. AD).

The Gaulish ethnonym Carnutes literally means 'the horned ones', probably in reference to their combat helmets, from the Gaulish stem carno- ('horn'). It is linguistically related to the Brittonic *Kornouii and the Welsh Kernyw, both designating the Cornwall region.

The city of Chartres, attested ca. 400 as Carnotum (Carnotis ca. 650, Cartis in 930), is named after the Gallic tribe.

== Geography ==
=== Territory ===
The Carnutes occupied a large territory in the middle Loire basin, across the modern departments of Eure-et-Loir, Loiret and Loir-et-Cher. It reached the Eure in the north-west. To the south the Loire formed its boundary with the Bituriges. The country formed a zone of transition between the basins of the Loire and the Seine.

The sheer extent of their territory brought the Carnutes into contact with many neighbours: the Veliocasses, the Parisii, the Senones, the Aedui, the Bituriges, the Turones, the Aulerci Cenomani, the Esuvii and the Aulerci Eburovices.

The civitas was not culturally uniform. Sandrine Riquier has argued that it comprised two distinct entities, one in the north and one in the south, set apart by their material culture, their coin types and their burial rites. This bipolar structure was already present in the 2nd century BC, and it may lie behind the division of the civitas into two parts at the end of the 3rd or the beginning of the 4th century AD.

=== Settlements ===
From the early 2nd century BC (La Tène C), population began to gather into open lowland agglomerations, and in several cases such a settlement was followed by a fortified oppidum on a nearby height in the 1st century BC (La Tène D).

The chief centre was Cenabum (Orléans), a bridge town on the Loire that was drawn into the trade networks from La Tène C, and which Caesar names as an oppidum and Strabo as an emporion. Its bridge is dated by dendrochronology to 159 BC, and an urban fabric took shape there between about 150 and 130 BC. Venceslas Kruta takes Cenabum to be the economic centre of the people but doubts that it was their central place, given its position on the Bituriges frontier, and assigns that role rather to the oppidum of Chartres. At Autricum (Chartres) the Iron Age occupation is poorly known, and no fortified oppidum has been demonstrated. A large ditch enclosing about 300 ha, once thought protohistoric, is now held to be probably Roman, so that any Iron Age oppidum there would have been a smaller spur or plateau site.

Several other sites are known. At Châteaudun a spur above the Loir was cut off by a rampart and has yielded coins of the Carnutes and of other peoples, probably marking an oppidum of about 25 ha. Fort Harrouard, on the northern edge of the civitas, struck potin coins in La Tène D2 but did not become an oppidum, and was more probably an aristocratic residence near chariot burials of the same period. At Saumeray a lowland agglomeration combined domestic, craft and cultic quarters yet stood apart from the import networks, its pottery being mostly local.

== History ==
Little is recorded of the Carnutes before the middle of the 1st century BC. A legendary tradition counted them among the peoples that joined the migration of Bellovesus into Italy. Their earlier history is otherwise known mainly from archaeology, which shows open lowland agglomerations multiplying across the territory from the early 2nd century BC.

=== Gallic Wars ===
At the time of the Gallic Wars the Carnutes were clients of the Remi. In 57 BC Roman legions wintered in their territory, and Caesar set over them as king Tasgetius, a man of royal descent and a loyal ally. Tasgetios was killed by some of his own people in 54 BC, in the third year of his reign, and the Carnutes submitted the year after.

The Carnutes were among the chief instigators of the general revolt of 52 BC, and the decisive meeting of the conspirators may have been held on their territory, the seat of the druidic assembly. At the very start of that year, at Cenabum, they killed the Roman traders settled in the town, an act led by two of their number, Cotuatos and Conconnetodumnos, and so gave the signal for the rising. Caesar took Cenabum soon afterwards and plundered and burned it. The Carnutes nonetheless sent a contingent of 12,000 men to the army that marched to relieve Alesia. A further campaign was fought in their country at the very beginning of 51 BC, and Caesar later returned to put to death the gutuater, whom he calls "the chief author and instigator of the war", perhaps one of the two leaders of the previous year's rising.

=== Roman period ===
Under Roman rule the civitas had two centres. Cenabum (Orléans), which had been the more important place before the conquest, lay in the south. Autricum (Chartres), in the north, became the capital. This bipolar territory has been described as without parallel in Gaul.

== Religion ==
The Carnutes are chiefly known for the assembly of the druids that Caesar located in their land. According to Caesar, at a fixed time of year the druids sat in a consecrated place (locus consecratus) in the country of the Carnutes, which was held to be the centre of the whole of Gaul, and there people from every quarter who had disputes came to accept their rulings and judgements.

Caesar does not say that this place was a wood or a forest. Sophie Krausz notes that the familiar image of a 'forest of the Carnutes' may be a modern construction of the 19th or early 20th century, and links it in part with Camille Jullian, who regarded a sacred wood as likely while conceding that Caesar had made no mention of one. The Latin locus ('place') and lucus ('sacred grove') had long been confused. Jean-Louis Brunaux has argued, from the sanctuaries of Gournay-sur-Aronde, Ribemont-sur-Ancre and Saint-Maur, that sacred woods appeared only late among the Celts, probably not before the 3rd century BC.

Caesar's statement that the Carnutes lay at the centre of Gaul does not fit the geography of Gaul as he himself defined it. Drawing on Jean-Louis Brunaux, Krausz argues that the notion is not a mistake but probably goes back to Posidonius, and that the Carnutes stood rather at the centre of the area combining two of Caesar's three parts of Gaul, Celtica and Belgica. It was in this zone that druids were attested, and not in Aquitania or Narbonensis. Krausz sets the assembly within a wider Celtic and Belgic community that held common gatherings at a consecrated place.

The site of the locus consecratus is unknown. Krausz reviewed the many hypotheses catalogued by Alain Ferdière, among them the Carnute sanctuaries of Pithiviers-le-Vieil, Saint-Benoît-sur-Loire and Neuvy-en-Sullias, but found no archaeological evidence to decide between them. The monumental Saint-Martin-au-Val sanctuary at Chartres has been proposed as a possible candidate in an urban setting.

== Material culture ==
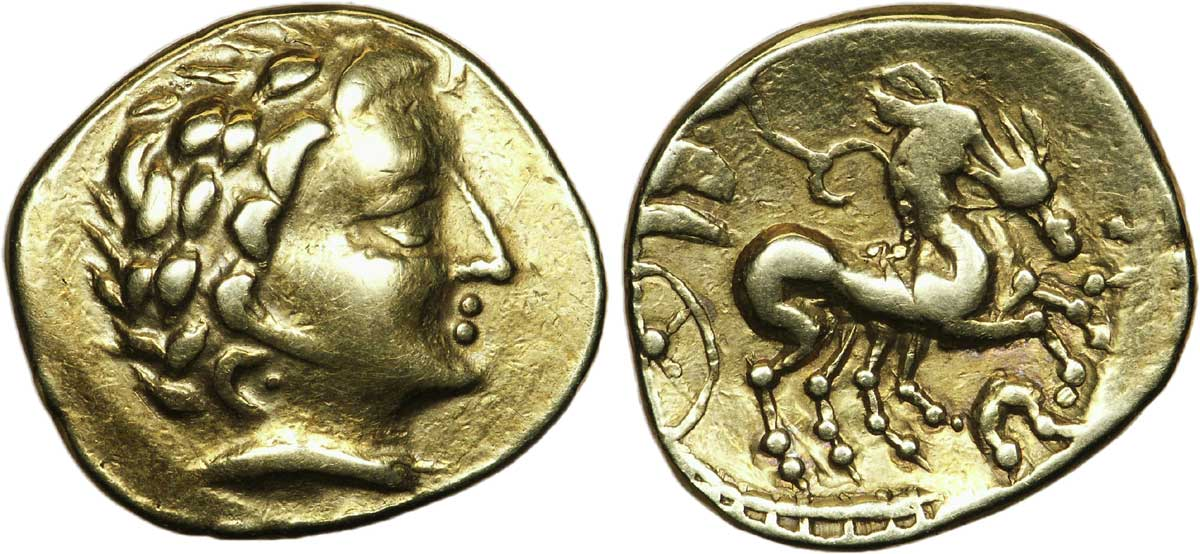
Gold stater of the Carnutes, 1st century BC

The Carnutes struck potin and bronze coins. Names appearing on their bronze coinage include that of the king Tasgetios, paired with the name Elkesovix, on issues whose images are borrowed from Roman denarii. The name Acutios is also found on bronze coins, attributed either to the Carnutes or to the neighbouring Turones. No murus gallicus is known in their territory, in contrast with the neighbouring Bituriges, and its absence has been taken to raise the question whether the civitas marks the northern limit of that type of rampart.

At Chartres the sanctuary of Saint-Martin-au-Val, laid out around a monumental quadriportico measuring 300 by 200 m and covering some 6 ha, was built between the 1st and 3rd centuries AD. It is one of the largest sanctuaries known in Roman Gaul, and has been interpreted as the civic sanctuary of the Carnutes.
