= Venceslas Kruta =

French archeologist and historian (1939–2026)

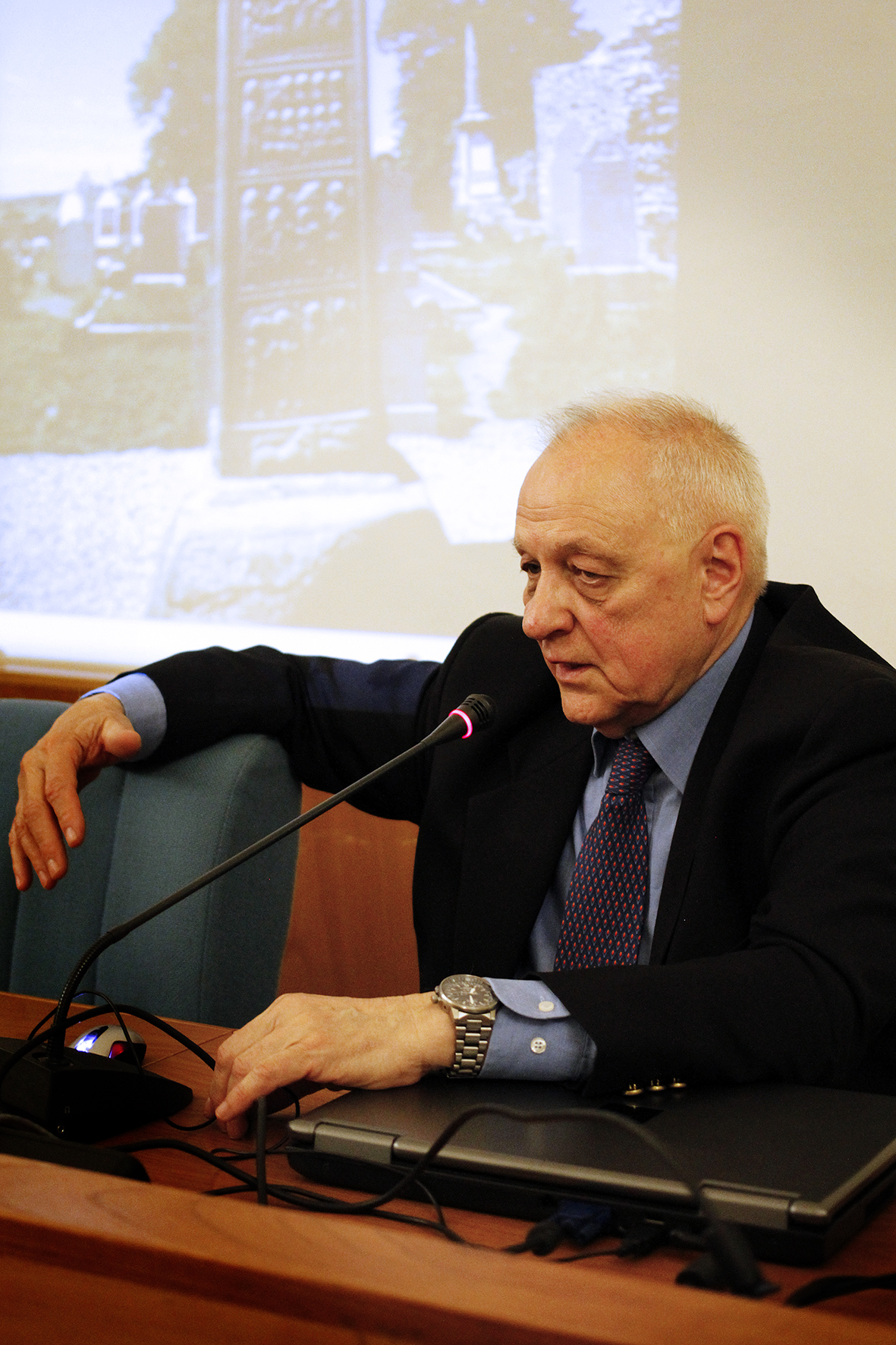
- Kruta in 2015
- Born: 4 November 1939; Saumur, France
- Died: 19 July 2026 (aged 86)
- Citizenship: French
- Occupations: Archaeologist, historian

Academic background
- Education: Sorbonne University

Academic work
- Institutions: Sorbonne University; École pratique des Hautes Études
- Notable works: Les Celtes, histoire et dictionnaire (2000)

Venceslas Kruta (4 November 1939 – 19 July 2026) was a French archaeologist and historian. He was the director of European protohistory studies at the École pratique des Hautes Études (EPHE), and Professor emeritus at the Sorbonne University. Kruta has also directed the Centre d'Études Celtiques in Paris and the journal Études Celtiques, and has chaired the editorial board of the journal Gallia (CNRS).

Kruta specialised in the protohistory of Europe, more specifically the commercial and cultural relations between Central Europe and the Mediterranean. He has directed numerous excavation sites, most notably the parvis of Notre-Dame and the Square Court of the Louvre in Paris. Kruta was a member of the German Archaeological Institute, the Real Academia de la Historia, the Istituto Nazionale di Studi Etruschi ed Italici, and the Académie de Versailles.

== Life and career ==
Venceslas Kruta was born on 4 November 1939 in Saumur, Pays de la Loire. He studied prehistory and archeology at Masaryk University in Czechoslovakia between 1956 and 1961, then worked as an assistant at the Czech Academy of Sciences between 1963 and 1971. He obtained a doctorate in history from Sorbonne University in 1974.

In 1991, he directed an international exposition on the Celts in Venice, then another in Tokyo in 1998. His 2000 book Les Celtes, histoire et dictionnaire received the Grand Prix d'Histoire from the Académie Française and the Prix Estrade-Delcros from the Académie des Inscriptions et Belles-lettres.

Kruta died on 19 July 2026, at the age of 86.
