= Gaulish Dis Pater =

Gaulish god described by Caesar

In Book 6 of his Commentaries on the Gallic War, Julius Caesar refers to a Gaulish god whom the druids believed that all the Gauls were descended from. He does not give this god's name, but (following the practice of interpretatio romana) refers to him under the name of a Roman god he deemed comparable: Dis Pater, Roman god of prosperity and of the underworld.

The identification of the god behind Caesar's description has been a long-standing subject of Celtic religious research. The most often cited candidate for "Gaulish Dis Pater" is Sucellus, a mallet-wielding god of the Gauls. The arguments for this identification are largely based on iconographic parallels with mallet-wielding figures in Etruscan, Greek, and Roman mythology. Other major candidates include Taranis, the only Celtic god elsewhere identified with Dis Pater in classical literature, and Cernunnos, a Celtic god who perhaps had chthonic/fertility associations.

The passage in which Caesar described Gaulish Dis Pater has also been appreciated for the light it throws on Celtic date-keeping, and its innovative ethnographic methods. Greco-Roman ethnography prior to Caesar usually attempted to fit the origins of barbarian peoples into Greek mythological frameworks. Caesar broke with this in reproducing a native Gaulish tradition about their descent. Elias Bickerman deemed this passage a "Copernican discovery" in the history of Greco-Roman ethnography.

== Caesar and Gaulish Dis Pater ==
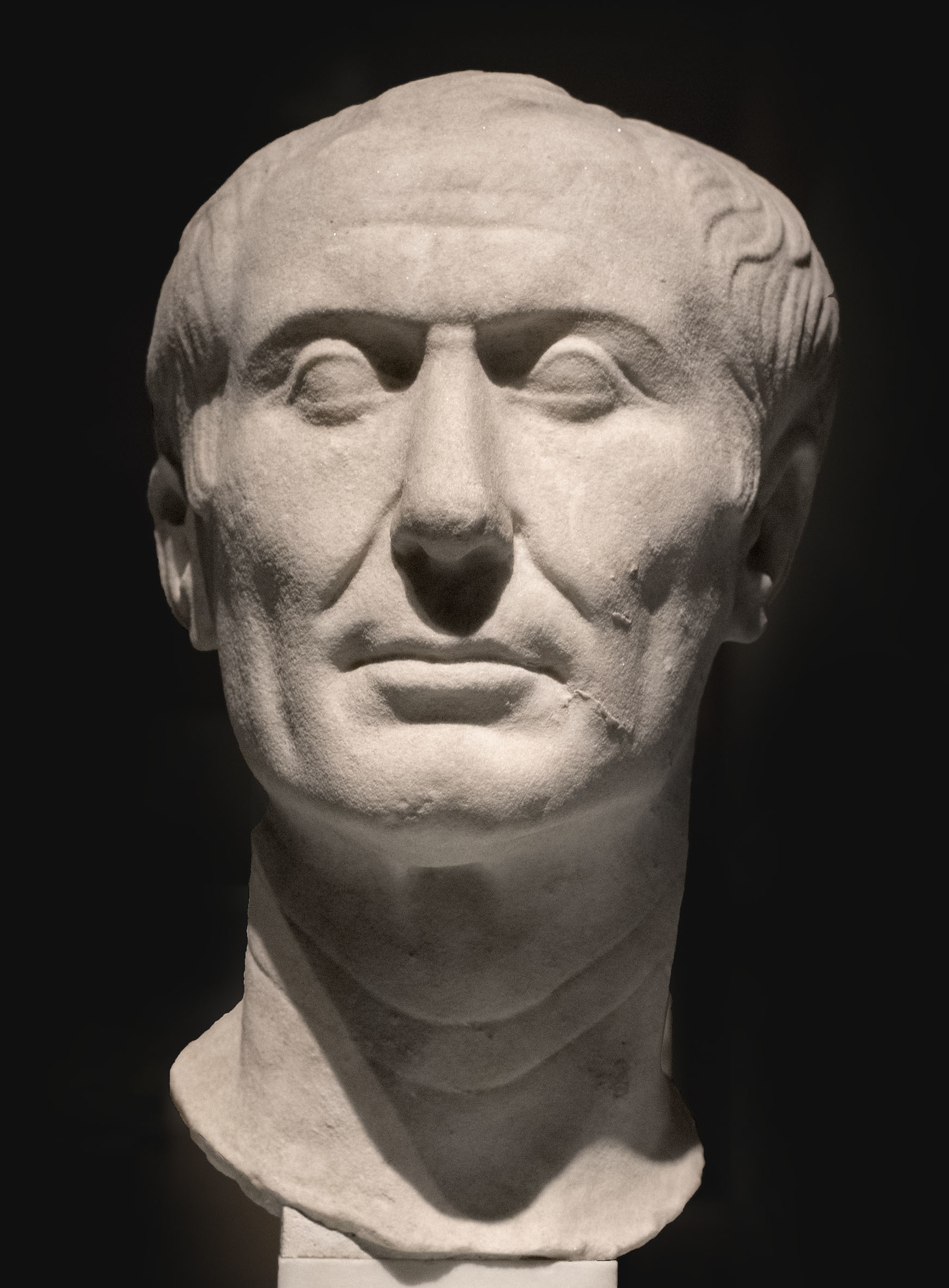
Julius Caesar

The Commentaries on the Gallic War is Caesar's first-hand account of the Gallic Wars (58–50 BCE), written during or shortly after those wars. His first-hand acquaintance with the Gauls (as well as his access to earlier, now-lost, works on the Celts) makes the work an invaluable source for Gaulish religion, although not an unproblematic one. In Book 6 of the Commentaries, Caesar describes (under Roman names) the five main deities worshipped in Gaul (§6.17); in the following section (§6.18) he adds one more to this pantheon:

The Gauls affirm that they are all descended from a common father, Dis Pater, and say that this is the tradition of the Druids. For that reason they determine all periods of time by the number, not of days, but of nights, and in their observance of birthdays and the beginnings of months and years day follows night.

Caesar refers to the Gaulish god from whom the Celts claimed descendance under the name of a Roman god, Dis Pater. Such a practice, of referring to foreign deities under Roman names, was called by Tacitus the interpretatio romana (Roman interpretation). A foreign god was equated with a Roman one on the basis of their similarity, however superficial; usually it was sufficient that the gods have one sphere of influence in common. The practice was fairly flexible in the Celtic regions, where one Celtic god could have multiple Roman equivalents, and one Roman god many Celtic equivalents. In Roman accounts of Celtic or Germanic religion, the application of interpretatio romana is the rule. Nonetheless, Caesar's application of this device in one of the most detailed surviving accounts of Celtic religion has caused much difficulty for scholars. (Note: Compare the difficulties with identifying Gaulish Mercury.) The identification of Gaulish Dis Pater has been a long-standing subject of Celtic religious research.

An excursus on the origin of Celtic people is a frequent feature of classical ethnographies of the Celts. However, classical ethnographies of barbarian peoples prior to Caesar, as a rule, gave Greek mythological explanations of their origins. Thus, Timaeus explains the Celtic Galatians as descendants of Galates, a son of Polyphemus; and Parthenius explains the Celts as descendants of Keltus, a son of Heracles; among many other such traditions. Caesar broke with this tradition in reproducing, and crediting, a native Celtic tradition about their own origins. Elias Bickerman refers to this a "Copernican discovery" in the history of Greco-Roman ethnography.

Caesar connects the druidic traditions about Gaulish Dis Pater with the Celtic practice of date-keeping by nights. Evidence for this practice among the Celts is otherwise given by the Gaulish words designating three- and ten-day feasts, tri-noxtion ("three nights") and decam-noctiacus ("ten nights"), and the modern Welsh words for week and fortnight, wythnos ("eight nights") and pythefnos ("fifteen nights"). Though unfamiliar to the Romans, such a method of date-keeping is not cross-culturally rare; the Greeks, Arabs, and Germanic peoples all made some use of it (indeed, the English word "fortnight" is a remnant of such a Germanic practice). It is not clear whether the connection between date-keeping and Gaulish Dis Pater is a surmise of Caesar's or a tradition of the druids.

== Dis Pater in Rome and in the Celtic provinces ==
Dis Pater was the Roman god of the underworld and of prosperity. Dis Pater seems to have been invented for the Tarentine Games (a roughly centennial Roman religious celebration, begun in 249 BCE) as a Roman equivalent of the Greek god Pluto (better known as Hades). As even the Romans acknowledged, the name Dis (Latin for "rich") is a direct translation of the Greek name Pluto (from ploûtos, "riches"). Outside of the Tarentine Games, Dis Pater played only a minor part in Roman religion. Only two identifiable images of him have survived. Dis Pater appears most prominently in Latin literature, where he takes the place that Pluto/Hades occupies in Greek literature.

The archaeological evidence for the worship of Dis Pater in the Celtic provinces is very limited. If Gaulish Dis Pater was as important as Caesar made out, the interpretatio Caesar offers cannot have been much adopted. In any case, this evidence is of little help in identifying Gaulish Dis Pater. An inscription from Bregenz perhaps identifies the Celtic god Smertrios with Dis Pater. However, the reading is not very certain, (Note: An altar (AE 1950, 98) found in the church in Großbuch, Klagenfurt, Germany gives a votive inscription to a god; the only portion of this god's name that has clearly survived is ]TI SMER[. Robert Egger proposed to reconstruct this name as [Di]ti Smer[trio] ("Dis Smertrios"), a proposal which has been followed by some. However, Józef Zając proposed to reconstruct it [Mar]ti Smer[trio] ("Mars Smertrios").) and Smertrios is more usually identified with Mars. One heterodox aspect of Dis Pater's cult in the Western provinces (and particularly in Germania Superior) is that he is frequently paired with the goddess Erecura (Note: See the epigraphic evidence collected in the Lexicon Iconographicum Mythologiae Classicae; the sculpture of Dis Pater and Erecura from Sulzbach (CIL XIII, 6322); and (as a unique example of her presence in Rome) the banquet painting from the Hypogeum of Vibia.) (rather than with Proserpina, as he was in Rome). However, little is understood about her cult (which, in any case, was concentrated in a non-Celtic province) so this does not aid much in the identification of Gaulish Dis Pater.

== Candidates ==
=== Sucellus ===
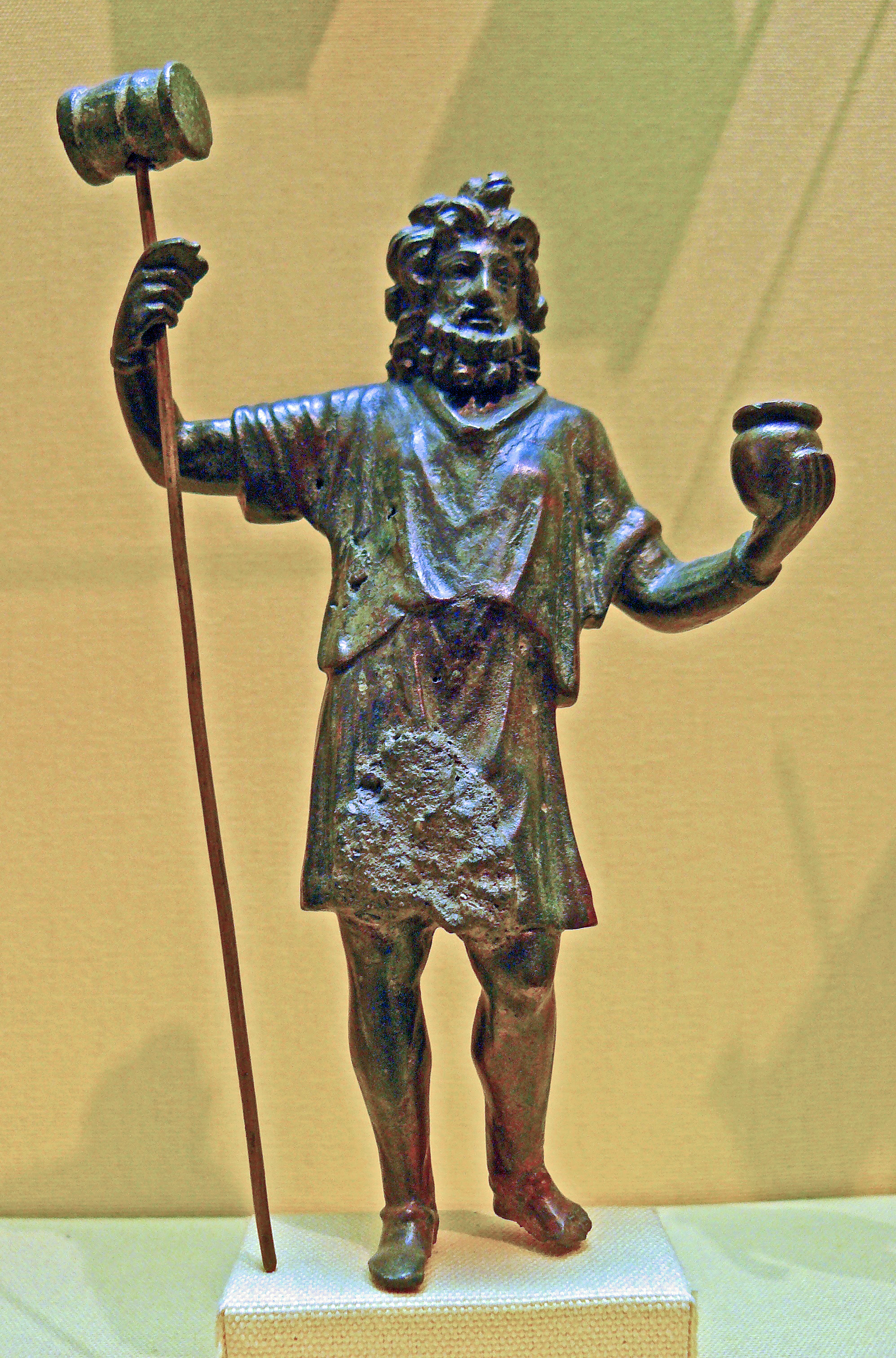
Statue of Sucellus at the National Archaeological Museum, France

Sucellus is a Celtic god is best known from his distinctive and well-attested iconography, in which he is depicted with a mallet and an olla. His nature as a god is not clear. (Note: As Stéphanie Boucher points out, Sucellus has been variously interpreted as a sky god, an underworld god, a god of prosperity, a god of war, an astral god.) The Roman god most closely associated with Sucellus (if not necessarily identified with him) was Silvanus, Roman god of the countryside. In Gallo-Roman iconography, Silvanus occasionally borrows the mallet and olla of Sucellus. In turn, Sucellus's iconography (which appears only after the Roman conquest) borrows from classical models, particularly those of the Roman god Jupiter and the Greek gods Pluto and Charon.

Sucellus is the god most often equated with Gaulish Dis Pater in modern scholarship. The argument for this identity is based on iconographic parallels. Sucellus's mallet plays a central role in such arguments. The characteristic mallet of the Etruscan psychopomp Charun (who was adapted into the Greek ferryman of the underworld Charon) has frequently been cited. The Greek god Dionysius, who had a chthonic aspect, was occasionally depicted with a similar mallet. To show that Dis Pater was similarly associated with the mallet, a passage from Tertullian has frequently been adduced. Tertullian records that, during Roman games, a slave dressed as Dis Pater used a mallet to drag corpses from the arena. Stéphanie Boucher is sceptical of the value of this comparison, arguing that this custom does not prove an association of Dis Pater with the mallet as much as it does an association of Dis Pater with Charun.

Some later myths and customs in Celtic nations have been cited to substantiate the proposed chthonic associations of the mallet among the Celts. (Note: Jan de Vries mentions the Breton myth of a woman with a hammer who put an end to the suffering of the aged. He also cites an English myth along the same lines, where a son was allowed to kill the father at seventy using a holy mallet. Helmut Birkhan cites the Scottish custom of burying a hammer with the deceased, in order that they may break down the gates of the underworld. Françoise Le Roux is sceptical of the worth of this evidence.) Other iconographic features of Sucellus have been incorporated into this interpretation. Some monuments of a mallet-wielding god (perhaps Sucellus) iconographically echo depictions of Hades/Pluto (for example, such a god is flanked by a Cerberus on a few depictions). The tunic of Charon bears a resemblance to the Gallic clothing of Sucellus.

Against this hypothesis, de Vries has pointed to the limited distribution of Sucellus (entirely absent from the west of Gaul) and the fact that the interpretatio romana of Sucellus as Jupiter is favoured by the epigraphic evidence. Boucher argues that the former point has no worth, as all representations of gods (whether Roman or Celtic) are rare in the west of Gaul.

=== Taranis ===
Taranis was a Celtic thunder god, and is one of the few Celtic gods known by his native name in classical literature, referenced as such in the Roman poet Lucan's epic Pharsalia. Lucan's poem was a popular school text, which created a demand for commentaries and scholia dealing with difficulties in grammar and subject matter. The best known collection of such scholia is the Commenta Bernensia, a set of notes to the poem preserved in an 11th-century CE manuscript, and with textual layers which date from the 4th to the 9th century CE. In glossing the passage in which Taranis is mentioned, the Commenta Bernensia notes that the sources available to it give different interpretatios of Taranis: some identify Taranis with Jupiter, and others identify Taranis with Dis Pater.

The Commenta Bernensia is the only other classical text to mention Dis Pater in relation to Celtic religion. It is difficult to evaluate the origin and significance of the Commenta's equation of Taranis with Dis Pater. The equation with Jupiter is better represented in the commentary tradition to Lucan (Note: Two other important early commentaries on Lucan, the contemporary Adnotationes super Lucanum and the slightly later Glossen ad Lucan, offer only the interpretatio of Taranis as Jupiter. The 11th-century Latin lexicographer Papias (who relies on the commentary tradition to Lucan) also offers only this interpretatio.) and confirmed by inscriptions; the parallel between Taranis and Jupiter's role as thunder gods is clear. On the other hand, Manfred Hainzmann points out Dis was associated in Latin literature with the night sky and night thunderstorms. Statius, for example, refers to Dis Pater as the "thunderer of the underworld" (Thebiad, 11.209). Taranis is sometimes identified with the Celtic wheel god (a Celtic god equated with Jupiter, who is only known from Celtic religious iconography). Fritz Heichelheim and Pierre Lambrechts have attempted to substantiate the connection between Taranis and Gaulish Dis Pater through features of this wheel god. (Note: Fritz Heichelheim cited the wheel god of Séguret, who has a snake coiled behind him, as evidence of the chthonic associations of Taranis. Pierre Lambrechts took the Jupiter Columns (monuments from Germania sometimes crowned equestrian depictions of the wheel god) as showing Taranis's dominion over both the underworld and overworld.)

=== Cernunnos ===
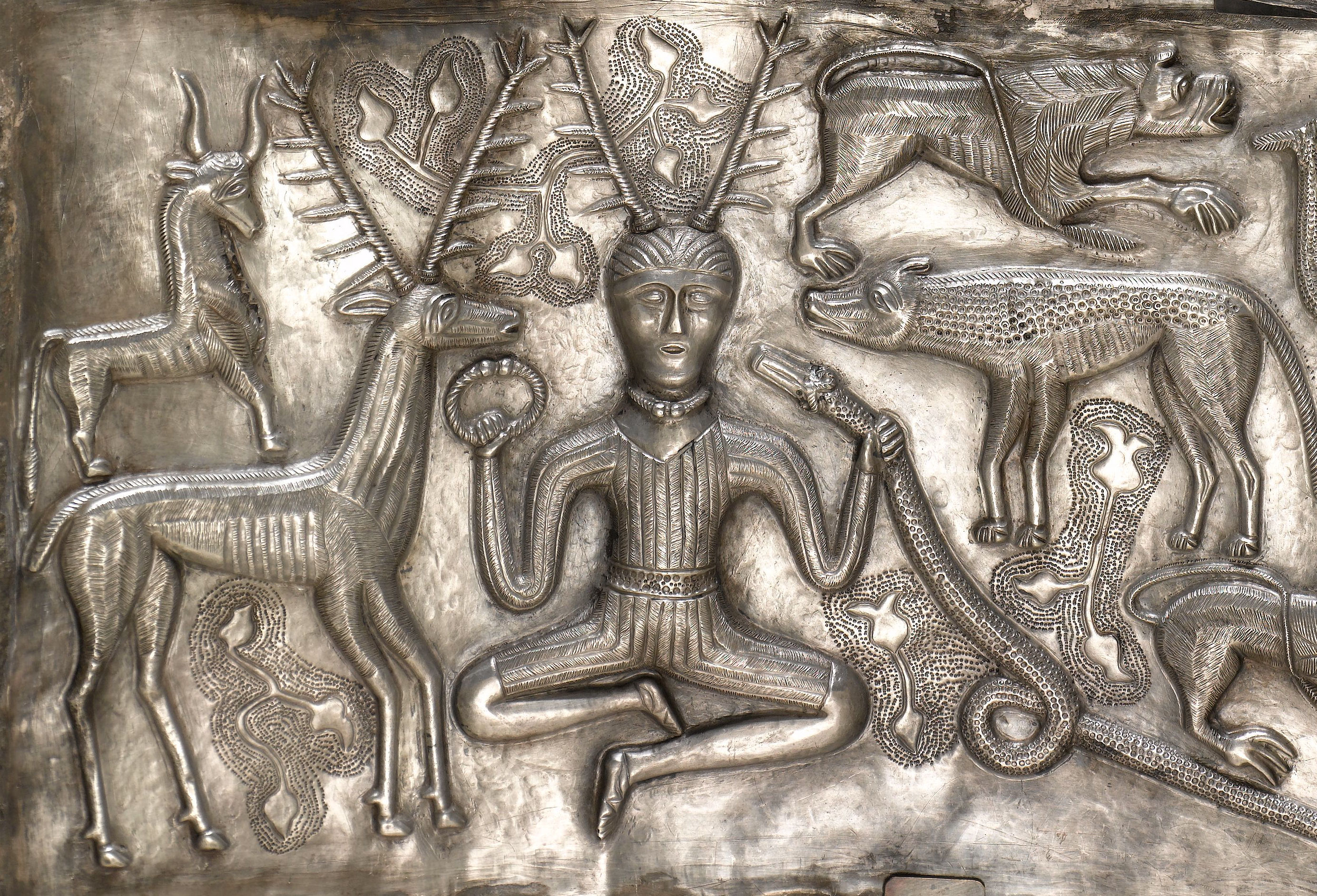
Cernunnos on the Gundestrup Cauldron. In his left hand is a ram-horned serpent, in his right hand is a torc.

Cernunnos is a Celtic god also primarily known from his distinctive iconography, in which he is portrayed as a cross-legged, deer-antlered man adorned with torcs. The surviving evidence does not attest to any interpretatio romana for this distinctly Celtic god, but it does repeatedly associate him with the Roman god Mercury. His attributes (stags, cornucopia, bags of coins) identify Cernunnos as a god of fertility and abundance. A chthonic association for this fertility god (suggested Cernunnos's companions, the ram-horned serpent and Mercury) has also been repeatedly proposed.

Phyllis Pray Bober and Robert Mowat have argued that Cernunnos is a natural candidate for an interpretatio of Dis Pater, as a god with a similar chthonic-fertility character. Bober also compared Cernunnos's association with bags of coins and Dis Pater's with underground metals.

=== Other hypotheses ===
Camille Jullian and Émile Linckenheld proposed that the Celtic tribal god Teutates was Gaulish Dis Pater. Jullian made this link on the basis of Teutates' role as a tutelary deity of Gaulish tribes, whereas Linckenheld made it on the basis of a statuette of Mercury found in the Gaulish sanctuary of Donon.

Francisco Marco Simón suggested that Gaulish Dis Pater was identifiable with the "nameless god" of the Celtiberians mentioned in Strabo's Geographia (3.4.16). This god, of whom little is understood, seems to have been ritually associated with the moon, a fact which Marco Simón connected with nocturnal Celtic date-keeping, and hence with Gaulish Dis Pater. Recently, Marco Simón's argument has been taken up and elaborated by Gabriel Sopeña Genzor and Vicente Ramón Palerm.

Salomon Reinach argued that the ram-horned serpent (a hybrid beast known from Celtic iconography, often accompanying Cernunnos) was a chthonic entity, identifiable as a regionally specific manifestation of Gaulish Dis Pater.

== Gaulish Dis Pater and Insular mythology ==
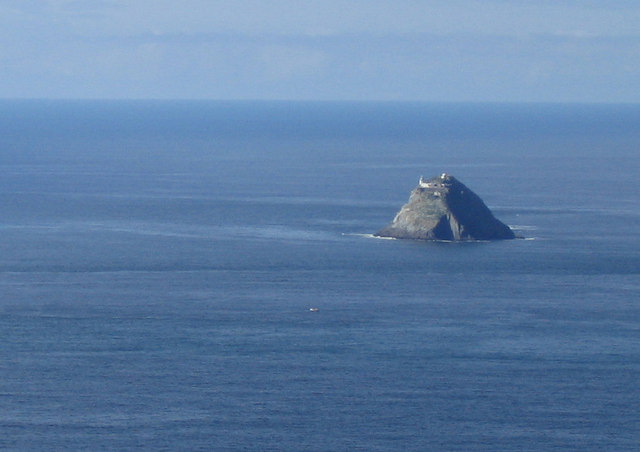
Bull Rock, off the southwest coast of Ireland, is often identified with Tech Duinn (the House of Donn).

Donn (etymologically, "the Dark One") is a figure of Irish mythology. Donn's house was an island called Tech Duinn (perhaps identifiable with Bull Rock). In some traditions, he wishes his descendants to go to the island after their deaths; in others, all the dead go to this island. This has given rise to the hypothesis that Donn was originally a god of the dead and ancestor god, therefore comparable with Gaulish Dis Pater.

Gaulish Dis Pater has also been compared with The Dagda, a figure of Irish mythology and euhemerised god who was nicknamed Ollathair ("father of all"); the Welsh and Irish ancestor-figures, Beli Mawr and Bilé; and the Welsh prince and ruler of the underworld, Pwyll.
