= Taranis =

Celtic god of thunder

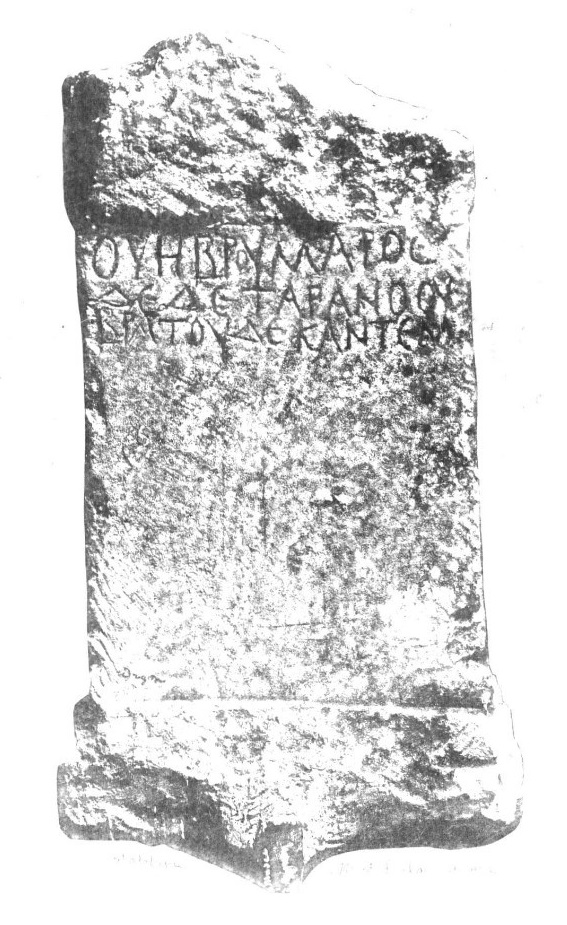
Altar from Orgon, France with a Gaulish inscription recording an offering to Taranis.

Taranis (sometimes Taranus or Tanarus) is a Celtic thunder god attested in literary and epigraphic sources.

The Roman poet Lucan's epic Pharsalia mentions Taranis, Esus, and Teutates as gods to whom the Gauls sacrificed humans. This rare mention of Celtic gods under their native names in a Latin text has been the subject of much comment. Almost as often commented on are the scholia to Lucan's poem (early medieval, but relying on earlier sources) which tell us the nature of these sacrifices: in particular, that the victims of Taranis were burned in a hollow wooden container. This sacrifice has been compared with the wicker man described by Caesar.

These scholia also tell us that Taranis was perhaps either equated by the Romans with Dis Pater, Roman god of the underworld, or Jupiter, Roman god of weather. Scholars have preferred the latter equation to the former, as Taranis is also equated with Jupiter in inscriptions. Both identifications have been studied against Caesar's lapidary remarks about the Gaulish Jupiter and Gaulish Dis Pater.

The equation of Taranis with Jupiter has been reason for some scholars to identify Taranis with the "wheel god" of the Celts. This god, known only from iconographic sources, is depicted with a spoked wheel and the attributes of Jupiter (including a thunderbolt). No direct evidence links Taranis with the wheel god, so other scholars have expressed reservations about this identification.

Various inscriptions attest to Taranis's worship, dating between the 4th century BCE and the 3rd century CE. Scholars have drawn contrary conclusions about the importance of Taranis from the distribution of these inscriptions.

== Name ==
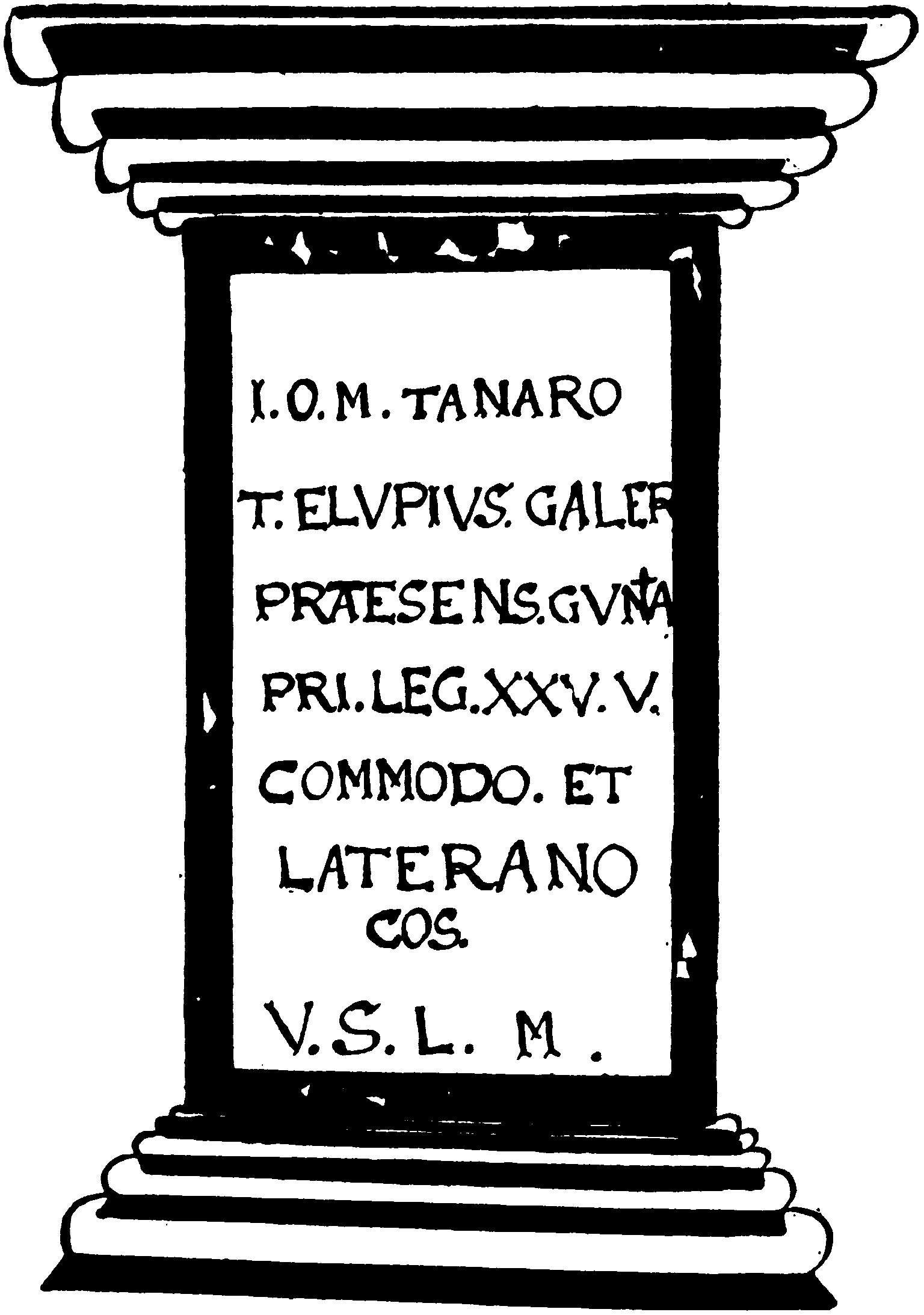
Altar dedicated to Jupiter Tanaris from Chester, England

=== Etymology and development ===
The name Taranis derives from proto-Celtic *torano- ("thunder"), which in turn derives from the proto-Indo-European root *(s)tenh₂- ("to thunder"). Through this proto-Celtic etymon, the theonym is cognate with words for thunder in Old Irish (torann), Old Breton (taran), Middle Welsh (taran), and, as a loanword into a non-Celtic language, the Gascon dialect of French (taram). The Proto-Indo-European s-initial seems to have been retained in Celtiberian steniontes, stenion, and stena.

During the development of Celtic, the word for thunder appears to have undergone a metathesis (transposition of syllables), shifting from *tonaro- to *torano-. For some time, scholars debated whether the Chester altar (154 AD) attests to an unmetathesised form of the god's name, Tanaris. The issue was settled by the discovery of a dedication to Iovi Tanaro ('Jupiter Tanaris') in Dalmatia, which confirms that this form did exist. Ranko Matasović and John T. Koch have also suggested that an old name for the River Po, Tanarus, derives from the unmetathesised form of the god's name.

=== Thunder god ===
The association with thunder, suggested by the etymology of Taranis's name, is confirmed by his equation with Jupiter. Taranis's name corresponds etymologically to that of the Germanic god Donar (i.e., Thor). Peter Jackson has conjectured that the theonyms Taranis and Donar (as well as perhaps the epithet Tonans of Jupiter) originated as a result of the "fossilization of an original epithet or epiklesis" of the proto-Indo-European thunder god *Perkʷūnos. Calvert Watkins compared Taranis's name with the name of the Hittite weather god Tarḫunna. However, Koch pointed out that an etymology linking the two theonyms would reverse the order of the metathesis (so that Taranis precedes Tanaris) and therefore compromise the proto-Indo-European etymology.

== Lucan and the scholia ==
=== Lucan ===
Lucan's Pharsalia or De Bello Civili (On the Civil War) is an epic poem, begun about 61 CE, on the events of Caesar's civil war (49–48 BCE). The passage relevant to Taranis occurs in "Gallic excursus", an epic catalogue detailing the rejoicing of the various Gaulish peoples after Caesar removed his legions from Gaul (where they were intended to control the natives) to Italy. The passage thus brings out two themes of Lucan's work, the barbarity of the Gauls and the unpatriotism of Caesar.

Tu quoque laetatus converti proelia, Trevir,
Et nunc tonse Ligur, quondam per colla decore
Crinibus effusis toti praelate Comatae;
Et quibus inmitis placatur sanguine diro
Teutates horrensque feris altaribus Esus
Et Taranis Scythicae non mitior ara Dianae.

Translation:

Transferral of the warfare pleased you too, Treviri,
and you, Ligures, now shorn of hair but once in all of Long-Haired
Gaul unrivalled for your tresses flowing gracefully over your necks;
and the people who with grim blood-offering placate
Teutates the merciless and Esus dread with savage altars
and the slab of Taranis, no kinder than Diana of the Scythians.

The substance of the last few lines is this: unspecified Gauls, who made human sacrifices to their gods Teutates, Esus, and Taranis, were overjoyed by the exit of Caesar's troops from their territory. The reference to "Diana of the Scythians" refers to the human sacrifices demanded by Diana at her temple in Scythian Taurica, well known in antiquity. That Lucan says little about these gods is not surprising. Lucan's aims were poetic, and not historical or ethnographic. The poet never travelled to Gaul and relied on secondary sources for his knowledge of Gaulish religion. When he neglects to add more, this may well reflect the limits of his knowledge.

We have no literary sources prior to Lucan which mention these deities, and the few which mention them after Lucan (in the case of Taranis, Papias alone (Note: Papias was a Latin lexicographer of the 11th century. His dictionary has entries for Teutates and Taranis, which do no more than give interpretatios of these pagan deities (the origin of whom Papias did not even know). Papias evidently relies on the commentary tradition to Lucan.)) rely on this passage. The secondary sources on Celtic religion which Lucan relied on in this passage (perhaps Posidonius) have not come down to us. This passage is one of the very few in classical literature in which Celtic gods are mentioned under their native names, (Note: For the most part, classical sources describe Celtic gods under Greek or Roman names without further comment. Georg Wissowa emphasises that Lucan "stands almost alone" (steht nahezu allein) apart from this tradition. Epona, the Gallo-Roman horse god, is a notable exception; she appears frequently in classical literature, and never under an interpretatio. Other Celtic gods mentioned under their own name in later literature include Belenus, Ogmios, Grannus, and Andraste.) rather than identified with Greek or Roman gods. This departure from classical practice likely had poetic intent: emphasising the barbarity and exoticness the Gauls, whom Caesar had left to their own devices.

Some scholars, such as Jan de Vries, have argued that the three gods mentioned together here (Esus, Teutates, and Taranis) formed a divine triad in ancient Gaulish religion. However, there is little other evidence associating these gods with each other. Other scholars, such as Graham Webster, emphasise that Lucan may as well have chosen these deity-names for their scansion and harsh sound.

=== Scholia ===
Lucan's Pharsalia was a very popular school text in late antiquity and the medieval period. This created a demand for commentaries and scholia dealing with difficulties in the work, both in grammar and subject matter. The earliest Lucan scholia that have come down to us are the Commenta Bernensia and Adnotationes Super Lucanum, both from manuscripts datable between the 9th and 11th centuries. In spite of their late date, the Commenta and Adnotationes are thought to incorporate very ancient material, some of it now lost; both are known to contain material at least as old as Servius the Grammarian (4th century CE). Also interesting, though less credible, are comments from a Cologne codex (the Glossen ad Lucan), dating to the 11th and 12th centuries. Below are excerpts from these scholia relevant to Taranis:

Commentary	Latin	English
Commenta Bernensia ad Lucan, 1.445	Taranis Ditis pater hoc modo aput eos placatur: in alveo ligneo aliquod homines cremantur.	Taranis Dispater is appeased in this way by them: several people are burned in a wooden tub.
Commenta Bernensia ad Lucan, 1.445	item aliter exinde in aliis invenimus. [...] praesidem bellorum et caelestium deorum maximum Taranin Iovem adsuetum olim humanis placari capitibus, nunc vero gaudere pecorum.	We also find it [depicted] differently by other [authors]. [...] the leader of wars and chief of the heavenly gods, Taranis, [they consider] to be Jupiter, who was once accustomed to be appeased with human heads, but now [is accustomed] to delight in those of animals.
Adnotationes super Lucanum, 1.445.	Taranis Iuppiter dictus a Gallis, qui sanguine litatur humano.	Taranis is called Jupiter by the Gauls, to whom sacrifices are made with human blood.
Glossen ad Lucan, 1.445	Tharanis Iuppiter. hi omnes in Teutonicis partibus colebantur a Taranu. ut feria teutonice dicitur.	Tharanis Jupiter. All of these were worshipped in the Teutonic regions at Taranus (?), as a day of the week is called in Teutonic. (Note: By teutonice ("Teutonic"), the scholiast of the Glossen means German, and the day of the week referred to is presumably Thursday (see *Þunras dag), though the connection is without foundation. The Latin in the Glossen is rather corrupt and the second half of the gloss to "Taranis" is obscure. David Stifter proposes to cut the first sentence off at colebantur, and read the following as: a Taranu V feria teutonice dicitur ("according to Taranus [?], the fifth day of the week is called this in Teutonic").)

The first excerpt, about the sacrifice to Taranis, comes from a passage in the Commenta which details the human sacrifices offered each of to the three gods (persons were suspended from trees and dismembered for Esus, persons were drowned in a barrel for Teutates). This passage, which is not paralleled anywhere else in classical literature, has been much the subject of much commentary. It seems to have been preserved in the Commenta by virtue of its author's preference for factual (over grammatical) explanation. The Adnotationes, by comparison, tell us nothing about the sacrifices to Esus, Teutates, and Taranis beyond that they were each murderous.

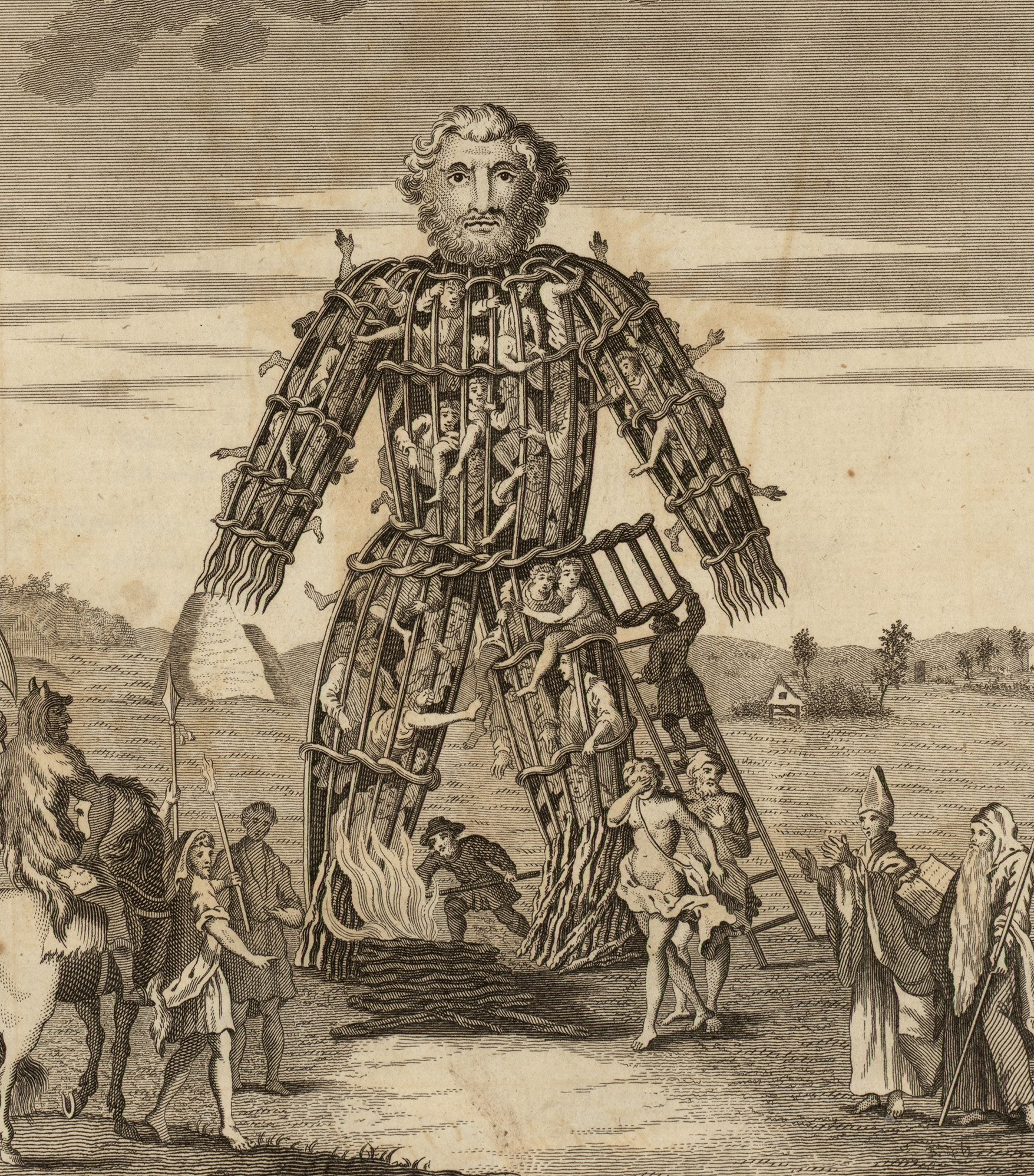
An imaginative 18th-century illustration of the wicker man

The Commenta tells us that as sacrifices to Taranis, several people were burned in a wooden alveus. The Latin word alveus is translated above as "tub", but it could applied to any hollow container. In various settings, the term could be used to mean a ship's hull, a bath tub, a drainage basin, a canoe, or a beehive. Miranda Green linked this sacrifice with the wicker man, the well-known wooden figure in which (according to Caesar and Strabo) the Celts burned humans as sacrifices.

The interpretatio romana of Taranis as Jupiter, given by all three commentaries, is otherwise attested in epigraphy, and agrees with our understanding of Taranis as a thunder god. By contrast, the interpretatio of Taranis as Dis Pater, which only the Commenta gives, (Note: The Commenta offers two sets of interpretatios of the three Celtic gods mentioned in Lucan. In the first set, Teutates is Mercury, Esus is Mars, and Taranis is Dis Pater. In the second set, Teutates is Mars, Esus is Mercury, and Taranis is Jupiter.) is quite obscure. It is not given in any inscription, and we do not know what Taranis had to do with the underworld. (Note: Among those who identify the Celtic wheel god with Taranis, some attempt has been made to substantiate the identification of Taranis with Dis Pater. Fritz Heichelheim cited the wheel god of Séguret, who has a snake coiled behind it, as evidence of the chthonic associations of Taranis. Pierre Lambrechts took the Jupiter columns as showing Taranis's dominion over both the underworld and overworld.) Manfred Hainzmann points out that Dis was associated in Latin literature with the night sky and night thunderstorms. Statius, for example, refers to Dis Pater as the "thunderer of the underworld" (Thebaid, 11.209).

In the course of giving the interpretatio of Taranis as Jupiter, the scholiast of the Commenta mentions that Taranis was "leader of wars". This is an unusual trait to associate with Jupiter rather than Mars (Roman god of war), though the Romans occasionally gave Jupiter martial functions. Hofeneder has associated the comment that Taranis was "appeased with human heads" with this martial function, as the (pre-Roman) Celtic custom of carrying off their foes' heads in battle is well-attested. The scholiast describes a transition from human to animal sacrifice, probably connected to the suppression of human sacrifice in Gaul in the Imperial period.

Caesar states in his Commentaries on the Gallic War that the Gauls regarded a Gaulish god (whom Caesar equated with Dis Pater) as their ancestor. As Taranis is the only Celtic god equated with Dis Pater in an ancient literary source, Taranis has often been a cited as a candidate for Gaulish Dis Pater. On the other hand, Caesar also briefly refers to an unnamed Gaulish god who "rules over all the gods" (imperium caelestium tenere), and whom he equates with Jupiter. It has been suggested that Taranis is behind this description. The similarity between Caesar's description of Gaulish Jupiter, and the Commenta's description of Taranis as "chief of the heavenly gods" (caelestium deorum maximum), has been noted, though this may reflect reliance on Caesar's text or a routine characterisation of the Roman god Jupiter.

== Taranis and the wheel god ==
The wheel god (Radgott) is a figure of Celtic religious iconography, a god wielding a spoked wheel. The wheel god is often depicted with the attributes of Jupiter: thunderbolt, sceptre, and eagle. The spoked wheel was an important religious motif for the Celts. Metal votive wheels (known as rouelles) are known from Iron Age Europe. The Lexicon Iconographicum Mythologiae Classicae lists 15 depictions of the wheel god. Some are statuettes of the god dressed in Gaulish garb, with a wheel in one hand and a thunderbolt in the other. A mosaic from Saint-Romain-en-Gal shows a woman and a man leaving sacrifices to such a statuette. An obscure scene on the Gundestrup cauldron perhaps shows a leaping devotee offering a wheel to the wheel god. The so-called Jupiter columns, religious monuments widespread in Germania, are frequently crowned with an equestrian god, who sometimes wields a wheel.

Because both were identified with Jupiter, Taranis has been repeatedly equated with the wheel god (for example, by Pierre Lambrechts, Jean-Jacques Hatt, and Anne Ross). However, nothing connects the gods directly. No inscription links Taranis with wheel iconography. Some scholars have rejected this equation. Green rejects it, and argues that the wheel god was a solar deity, naturally identifiable with Jupiter, but distinct from the thunder god Taranis. Gerhard Bauchhenß and Peter Noelke both express scepticism in their studies of Jupiter columns in Germany. Árpád M. Nagy described the equation as "probable, but not binding".

The combination of the thunderbolt and wheel as attributes is not unique to one deity. Hercules is occasionally depicted with these attributes in the Latin West; a female deity, perhaps wielding a thunderbolt and wheel, is known from a statue in Autun.

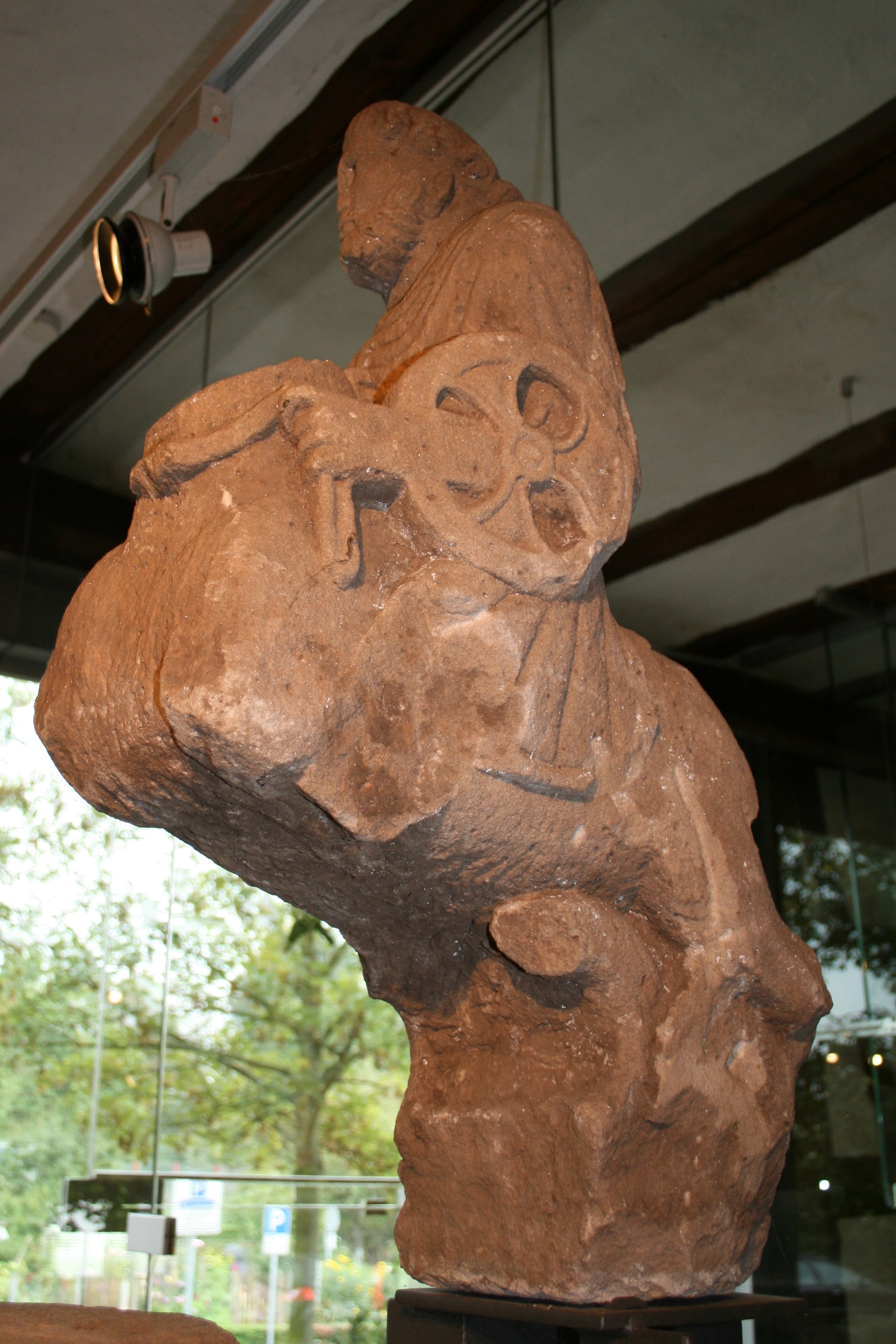
Jupiter Column rider with a wheel from Obernburg.

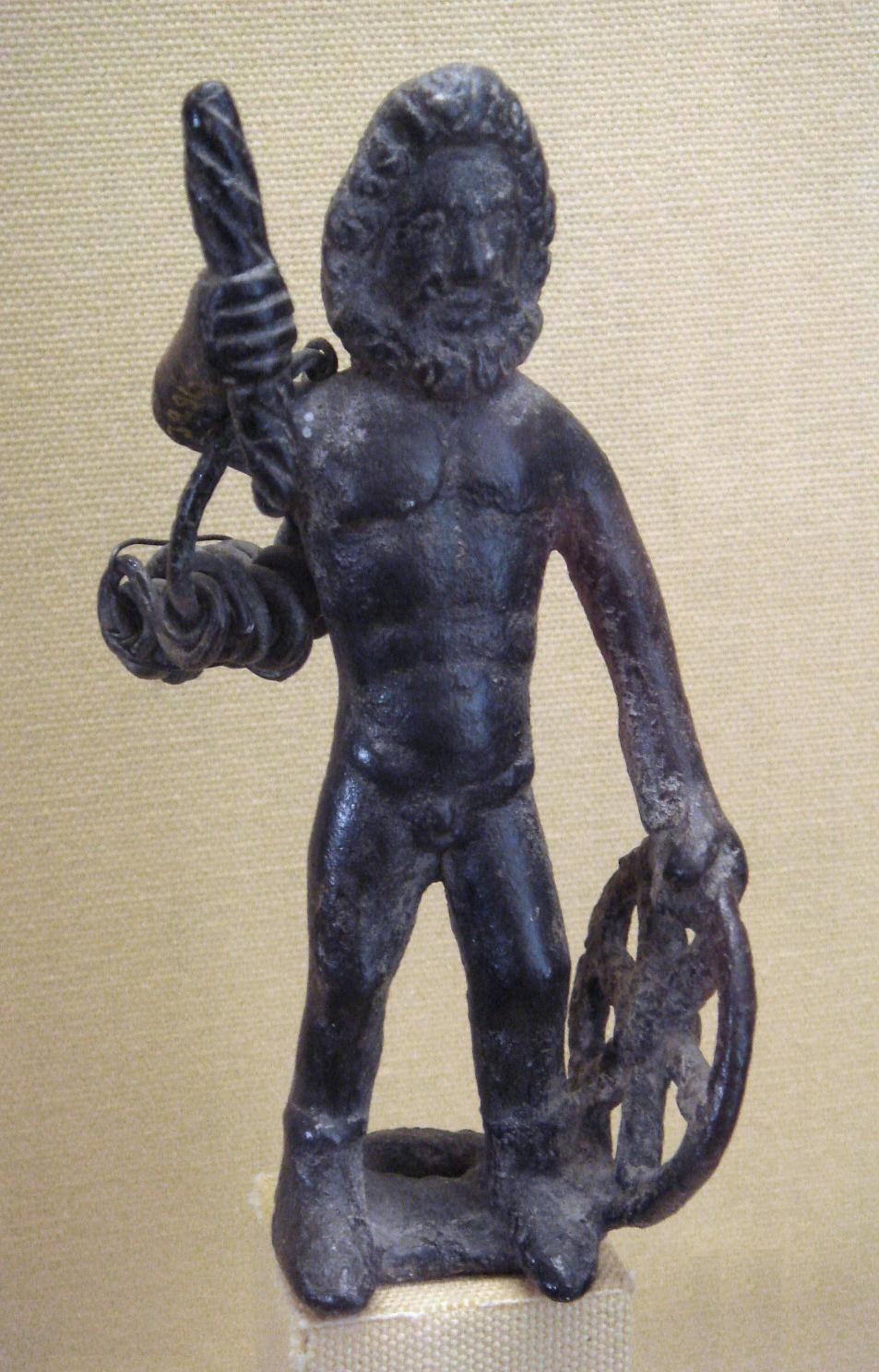
Jupiter with a thunderbolt and a wheel from Le Châtelet de Gourzon.

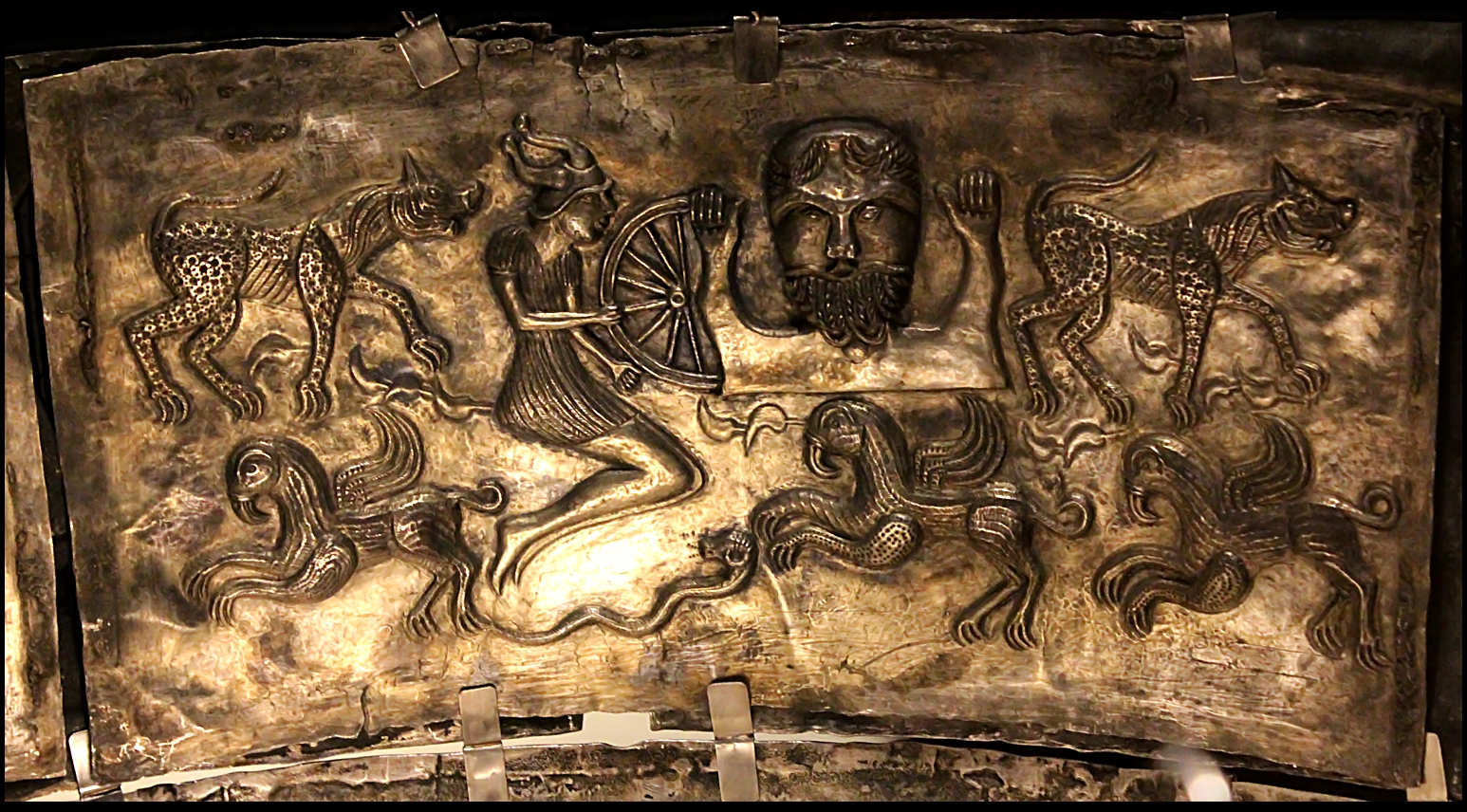
A broken wheel held by a large bearded man and a leaping man on the Gundestrup cauldron (plate C).

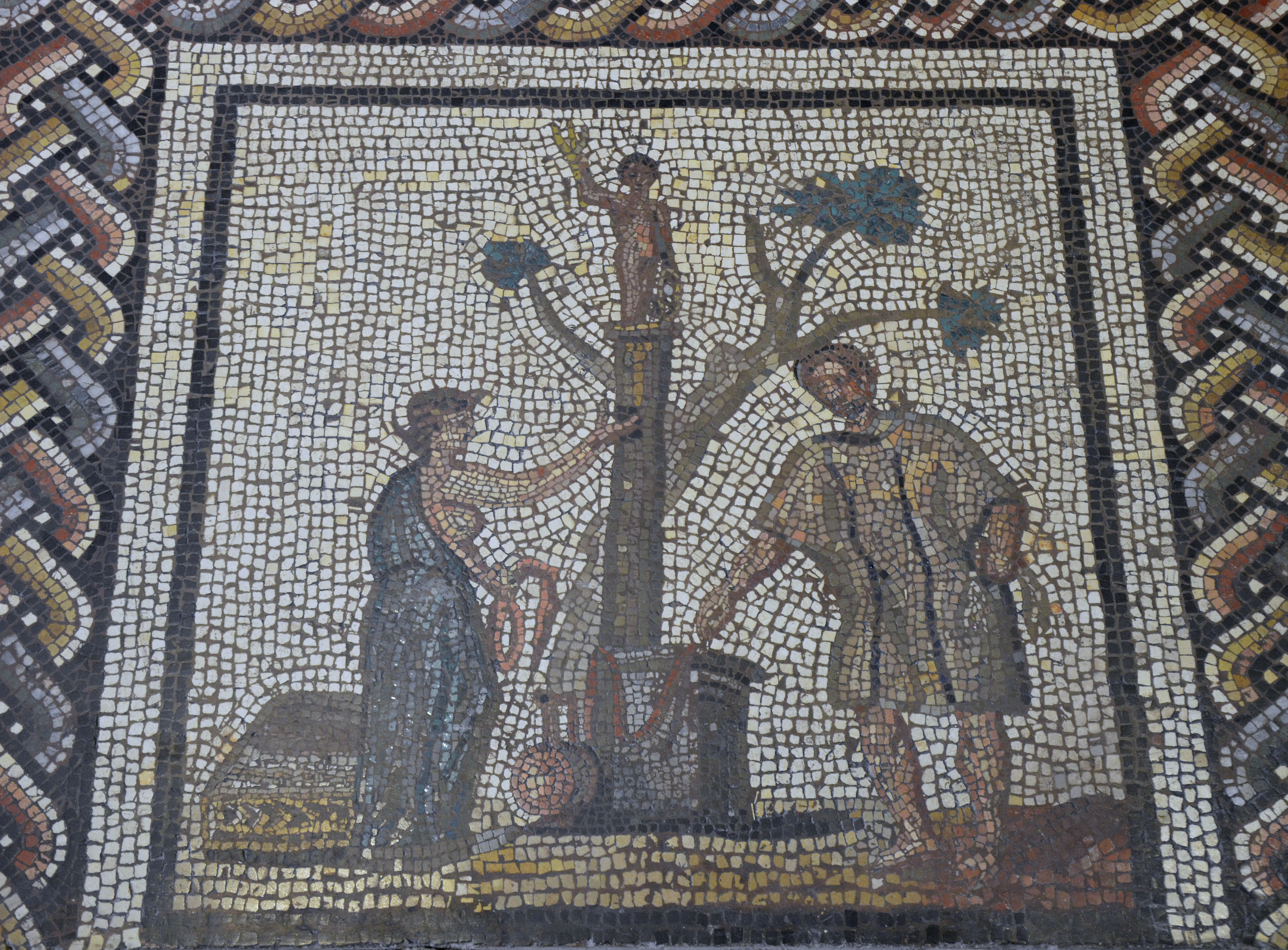
Scene of two people offering sacrifices to the wheel god (wheel in one hand, thunderbolt in the other) on a mosaic from Saint-Romain-en-Gal.

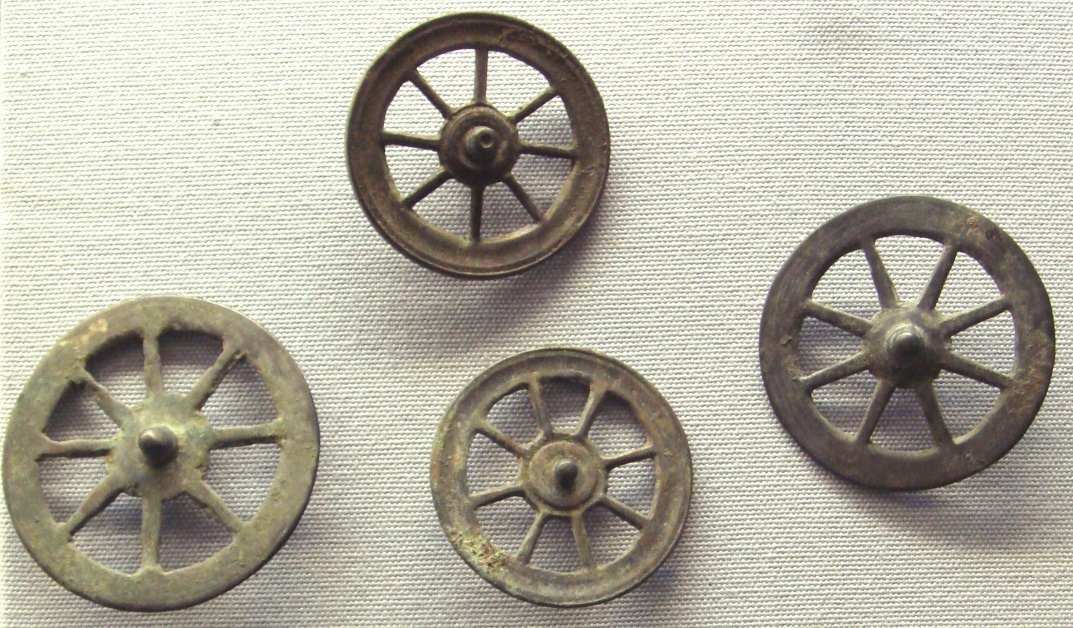
Votive wheels (rouelles) at the Musée d'Archéologie Nationale.

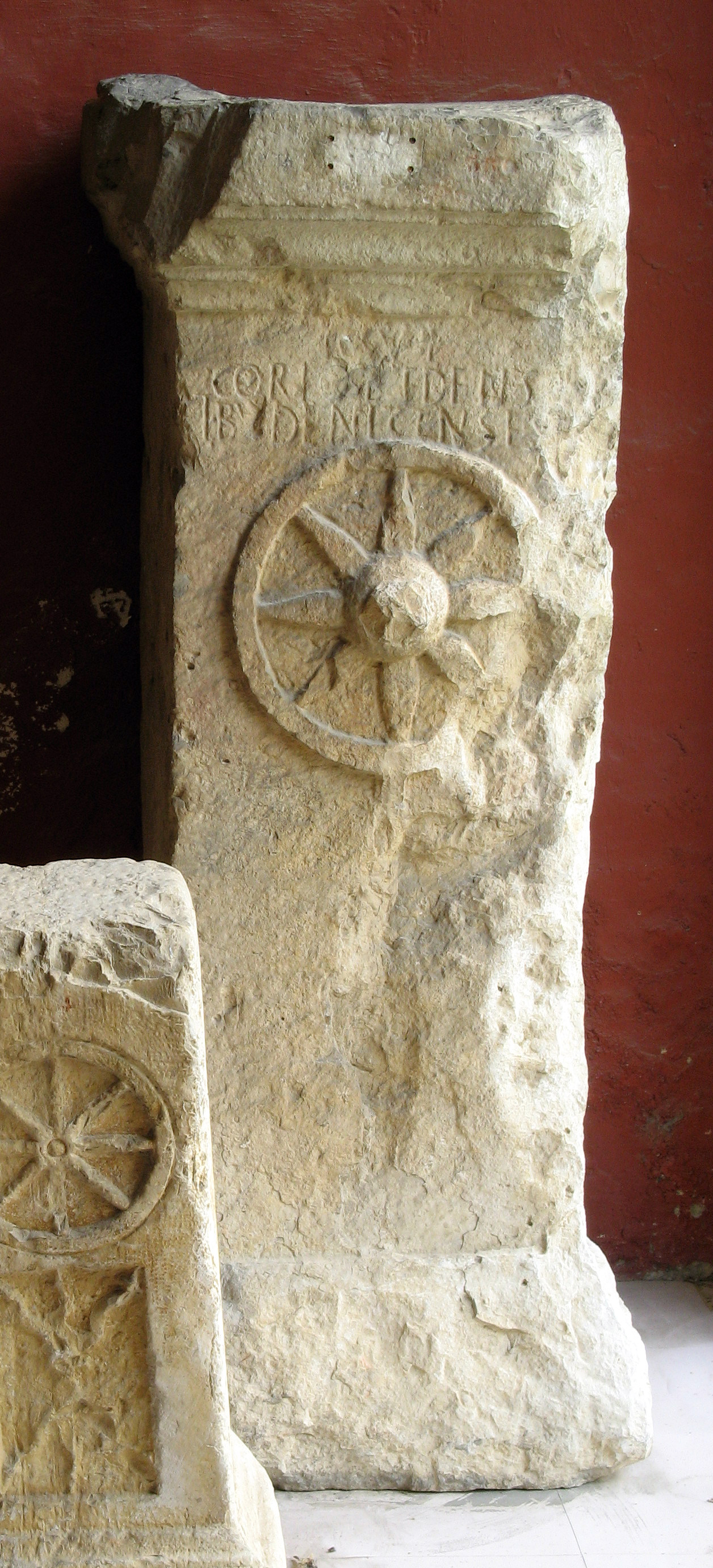
Altar to Jupiter with a relief of a wheel at the Musée de la Romanité.

== Epigraphy ==
Text	Context	Date	Language	Citation	Comments
ṣ a[ / kakaka[(?) / θarani[? / saφ̣ạṇa / θ̣]arani[?}	Inscribed on an object (perhaps a keyhandle) made from staghorn. Found in Sottopedonda, in the Fiemme Valley, Italy.	4th to 3rd century BCE	Raetic	TIR FI-1	The god Taranis (in the form Tarani) is invoked twice in this obscure (perhaps magico-religious) Raetic inscription. Simona Marchesini has argued that the absence of the Celtic final -s suggests "the god's name was well integrated in the Raetic world".
ΟΥΗΒΡΟΥΜΑΡΟΣ / ΔΕΔΕ ΤΑΡΑΝΟΟΥ / ΒΡΑΤΟΥΔΕΚΑΝΤΕΜ (translit. ouibroumaros / dede taranoou / bratoudekantem)	Inscribed on a small cippus. Found in Orgon, Bouches-du-Rhône, France.	2nd to 1st century BCE	Gaulish	RIG I G-27	Lejeune offers the translation "Vebrumaros offered Taranus in gratitude (?) the tithe (?)".
IOVI TAN(ARO) / ]S APER[	Inscribed on an altar. Found in Bribir, Dalmatia, Croatia.	First half of the 1st century CE	Latin	AE 2010, 1225	
TARANUOS	Inscribed on a terracotta jug. Found near Amiens, Somme, France.	1st century CE	Latin	AE 1966, 269	Another inscription found nearby (AE 1966, 268) suggests the find-spot was originally a place of religious significance.
PATE]RNIANUS(?) / V(IVUS) / [ALUM]NO(?) SUO / [PI]O(?) POSUIT / [3]EMIO // ]O[3] / [3]M SA[3] / UXO[RI] / TARANU[TIUS(?)] / COMATUL[LUS(?)	Found in Caesarodunum (Roman Tours), Indre-et-Loire, France	1st century CE	Latin	CIL XIII, 3083	Taranu[ is a personal name.
IOVI TA/RANUCO / ARRIA SUC/CESSA V(OTUM) S(OLVIT)	Found in Scardona (Roman Skradin), Dalmatia, Croatia	1st to first half of the 2nd century CE	Latin	CIL III, 2804	
E[ ]IMO / ESOET IVTRABAVTIO / RVTI DVO ESANA / TARAIN[I] PANOV / DIR FONT MEM / MIDR.MARMAR / EVI IABO . VIII . MV / MVLCOI CARBRVX (Note: This reading follows Jürgen Untermann. Other readings, by Pierre-Yves Lambert and Brigitte Galsterer, are given in the apparatus to RIG L-109.)	Inscribed on a gold lamella. Found in Baudecet, Gembloux, Belgium.	2nd century CE	Latin (perhaps with Gaulish, Greek or Germanic elements)	RIG II.2 L-109	This magico-religious inscription from Belgic Gaul is difficult to interpret. Several lines appear to be meaningless ephesia grammata. In arguing that the inscription has Gaulish elements, Karl Horst Schmidt and Patrizia de Bernardo proposed that line 4 invokes the god Taranis. However, Pierre-Yves Lambert proposed the tablet is an Orphic gold tablet, and reads this line as an Orphic formula in Greek.
NUM(INI) AUG(USTI) / ET I(OVI) O(PTIMO) M(AXIMO) / TARANUEN / D(E) S(UO) P(RO) P(IETATE) P(OSUIT)	Inscribed on an altar. Found in Thauron, Creuse, France.	2nd century CE?	Latin	AE 1961, 159	It is uncertain whether Taranuen is a god name or a personal name.
I(OVI) O(PTIMO) M(AXIMO) TANARO / L(UCIUS) [ELUFRIUS(?)] GALER(IA) / PRAESENS [CL]UNIA / PRI(NCEPS) LEG(IONIS) XX V(ALERIAE) V(ICTRICIS) / COMMODO ET / LATERANO CO(N)S(ULIBUS) V(OTUM) S(OLVIT) L(IBENS) M(ERITO)	Inscribed on an altar. Found in Chester, England.	154 CE	Latin	CIL VII, 168 = RIB 452	This votive inscription to Jupiter Tanarus, by one Lucius Elufrius Praesens from Clunia, was one of the Arundel marbles. The inscription is now badly weathered and illegible, but was read and recorded in the 17th century. The unusual form of the god's name here (Tanarus) has led to repeated suggestions of a misspelling on the part of the engraver or misreading in the original autopsy. However, the discovery of a dedication to Iovi Tanaro in Dalmatia has somewhat obviated these concerns.
IN H(ONOREM) D(OMUS) D(IVINAE) DEO / TARANUCNO // ET RAVINI / QUIBUS EX / COLLATA STIPEN[DIA] / IUL(IUS) IUL[3] / C(AIUS?) COPI[US(?)? EX] / IUSS[U POSU(ERUNT?)]	Inscribed on an altar. Found in Godramstein, Germany.	Second half of the 2nd century CE	Latin	CIL XIII, 6094	
DEO / TARANUCNO / VERATIUS / PRIMUS / EX IUSSU	Inscribed on an altar. Found in Böckingen, Germany.	Second half of the 2nd century to first half of the 3rd century CE	Latin	CIL XIII, 6478	
[...] VALE(N)S TARANIS [...]	Inscribed on a tablet. Found in Nicopolis ad Istrum, Bulgaria.	227 CE	Latin	CIL III, 6150 = CIL III, 7437 = CIL III, 12346	Vale(n)s Taranis is a personal name.

A few different forms of the god's name are known from epigraphy. The spelling "Taranus" (much more common than "Taranis" in epigraphy) is an older form than "Taranis". The un-metathesised form "Tanarus" is older still. There is also "Taranuc(n)us" ("son/descendant of Taranus"), known from two inscriptions of Germania Superior, which attaches a patronymic suffix to Taranis's name.

Scholars have drawn differing conclusions about Taranis's importance, and the geographical extent of his worship, from the epigraphic record. Marion Euskirchen calls the epigraphic evidence "scanty and altogether not unambiguous", which "suggests a rather limited significance of the god within a number of tribal federations". Hofeneder, on the other hand, states that Taranis is "attested surprisingly often" for a Celtic god, a fact which "clearly indicates that he must have been a deity worshipped in large parts of Keltiké and over a long period of time".

== See also ==
- Loucetios
- Sucellus
- Cernunnos
