= Junius Philargyrius =

Junius Philargyrius (Philargirius, Filargirius) was an early commentator on the Bucolica and Georgica of Vergil, dedicated to a certain Valentinianus. He was a member of the Junia gens, active in Milan.

The commentary is preserved in two recensions: one is found in the Berne scholia (ed. H. Hagen, Jahrbuch für classische Philologie Suppl. 4.5 Leipzig, 1867). The other contains Explan. 1 and 2 on the Buc., and the Brevis expositi on the Georg. (ed. Thilo and Hagen 1881).

The text is later than the first quarter of the 5th century, but there is no certain terminus ante quem, and dates in the 6th or 7th century are possible. It has been shown that the Explanationes were known to Adomán, abbot of Iona in the mid-seventh century.

== See also ==
- Titus Gallus
