= Teutates =

Celtic tribal god

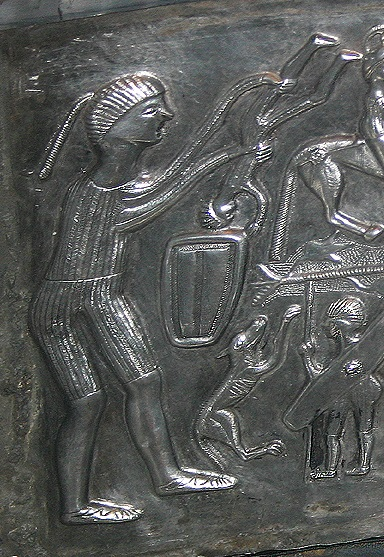
A large man lowers a warrior, headfirst, into a container. This scene from the Gundestrup cauldron may represent a sacrifice to Teutates.

Teutates (spelled variously Toutatis, Totatis, Totates) is a Celtic god attested in literary and epigraphic sources. His name, which is derived from a proto-Celtic word meaning "tribe", suggests he was a tribal deity.

The Roman poet Lucan's epic Pharsalia mentions Teutates, Esus, and Taranis as gods to whom the Gauls sacrificed humans. This rare mention of Celtic gods under their native names in a Latin text has been the subject of much comment. Almost as often commented on are the scholia to Lucan's poem (early medieval, but relying on earlier sources) which tell us the nature of these sacrifices: in particular, that victims of Teutates were immersed headfirst into a small barrel and drowned. This sacrifice has been compared with a poorly understood ritual depicted on the Gundestrup cauldron, some motifs in Irish mythology, and the death of the bog body known as the Lindow Man.

Teutates appears in a number of inscriptions, most of which have been found in border or frontier areas. When these inscriptions pair Teutates with a Roman god, they pair him with Mars. Alongside the inscriptions to Teutates, there are inscriptions to a number of etymologically related deities (Teutanus, Toutanicus, Toutiorix). The presence of these similar deity-names has been used to argue that "Teutates" was a generic name, applied to any tribe's tutelary deity.

Teutates has been linked to Roman rings with TOT inscribed on them (of which over 60 examples are known, concentrated in Lincolnshire, England) as these letters have been conjectured to be an abbreviation of "Totatis", a late variant of Teutates's name.

== Name ==
=== Etymology and development ===
The name Teutates derives from proto-Celtic *teutā ("tribe"). This proto-Celtic word is otherwise attested by Old Irish túath ("tribe"), Middle Welsh tut ("people, country"), and Cornish tus ("people"). Sometimes, Teutates is explained as a reflex of proto-Celtic *teuto-tatis ("father of the tribe"). However, this explanation is problematic, insofar as it assumes haplology (omission of a syllable) in the development of the word and requires that the "a" be short (which conflicts with Lucan's scansion).

In line with general Celtic vowel changes, the first vowel in the deity's name developed from /eu/ to /ou/ to /o/. Of the spellings attested in the epigraphic record, "Toutatis" attests to the second stage of this development, and "Totates" attests to the third. Given its date, the spelling "Teutates" in Lucan probably does not attest to the first stage. Latin lacked the diphthong /ou/ of Gaulish, so Latin speakers approximated this diphthong with /eu/ (the only u-diphthong in Latin). The epithet "Teutanos" (known from the Danube Valley) does, however, preserve this first stage. If it is an attestation of the god's name, the spelling "Tutate" on a 5th-century CE inscription from Poitiers may show a later vowel development from /o/ to /u/.

=== Protector of the tribe ===
It has been repeatedly suggested (for example, by Wolfgang Meid and Patrizia de Bernardo Stempel) that the theonym Teutates was a general title applied to tribal tutelary deities. Each tribe would therefore have its own Teutates. As evidence for this interpretation, scholars have pointed to the number of bynames similar to Teutates in the epigraphic record (Teutanus, Toutanicus, Toutiorix) and the inconsistency with which these bynames were associated with Roman deities. Jürgen Zeidler argues against this contention on the grounds that the suffix "-ati-" is uncommon; if the name was derived independently in each case, we would expect more variants along the lines of "tribal father" (for example, *teut-ater-, *teut-atta-, or *teuto-genos).

In his capacity as tribal deity, Teutates has been compared with the oath taken by several heroes of medieval Irish mythology: Tongu do dia toinges mo thúath ("I swear by the god by whom my tribe swears").

== Lucan and the scholia ==
=== Lucan ===
Lucan's Pharsalia or De Bello Civili (On the Civil War) is an epic poem, begun about 61 CE, on the events of Caesar's civil war (49–48 BCE). The passage relevant to Teutates occurs in "Gallic excursus", an epic catalogue detailing the rejoicing of the various Gaulish peoples after Julius Caesar removed his legions from Gaul (where they were intended to control the natives) to Italy. The passage thus brings out two themes of Lucan's work, the barbarity of the Gauls and the unpatriotism of Caesar.

Tu quoque laetatus converti proelia, Trevir,
Et nunc tonse Ligur, quondam per colla decore
Crinibus effusis toti praelate Comatae;
Et quibus inmitis placatur sanguine diro
Teutates horrensque feris altaribus Esus
Et Taranis Scythicae non mitior ara Dianae.

Translation:

Transferral of the warfare pleased you too, Treviri,
and you, Ligures, now shorn of hair but once in all of Long-Haired
Gaul unrivalled for your tresses flowing gracefully over your necks;
and the people who with grim blood-offering placate
Teutates the merciless and Esus dread with savage altars
and the slab of Taranis, no kinder than Diana of the Scythians.

The substance of the last few lines is this: unspecified Gauls, who made human sacrifices to their gods Teutates, Esus, and Taranis, were overjoyed by the exit of Caesar's troops from their territory. The reference to "Diana of the Scythians" refers to the human sacrifices demanded by Diana at her temple in Scythian Taurica, well known in antiquity. That Lucan says little about these gods is not surprising. Lucan's aims were poetic, and not historical or ethnographic. The poet never travelled to Gaul and relied on secondary sources for his knowledge of Gaulish religion. When he neglects to add more, this may well reflect the limits of his knowledge.

We have no literary sources prior to Lucan which mention these deities, and the few which mention them after Lucan (in the case of Teutates, Lactantius (Note: Lactantius's Christian apologia The Divine Institutes (c. 303-311 CE), in discussing human sacrifice among the pagans, very briefly mentions Esus and Teutates as pagan gods to whom the Gauls sacrificed humans. It is almost universally agreed that Lactantius borrows from Lucan here. He is known to have read Lucan's poem, and Lactantius's testimony does not go beyond Lucan's.) and Papias (Note: Papias was a Latin lexicographer of the 11th century. His dictionary has entries for Teutates and Taranis, which do no more than give interpretatios of these pagan deities (the origin of whom Papias did not even know). Papias evidently relies on the commentary tradition to Lucan.)) rely on this passage. The secondary sources on Celtic religion which Lucan relied on in this passage (perhaps Posidonius) have not come down to us. This passage is one of the very few in classical literature in which Celtic gods are mentioned under their native names, (Note: For the most part, classical sources describe Celtic gods under Greek or Roman names without further comment. Georg Wissowa emphasises that Lucan "stands almost alone" (steht nahezu allein) apart from this tradition. Epona, the Gallo-Roman horse god, is a notable exception; she appears frequently in classical literature, and never under an interpretatio. Other Celtic gods mentioned under their own name in later literature include Belenus, Ogmios, Grannus, and Andraste.) rather than identified with Greek or Roman gods. This departure from classical practice likely had poetic intent: emphasising the barbarity and exoticness the Gauls, whom Caesar had left to their own devices.

Some scholars, such as Jan de Vries, have argued that the three gods mentioned together here (Esus, Teutates, and Taranis) formed a divine triad in ancient Gaulish religion. However, there is little other evidence associating these gods with each other. Other scholars, such as Graham Webster, emphasise that Lucan may as well have chosen these deity-names for their scansion and harsh sound.

=== Scholia ===
Lucan's Pharsalia was a very popular school text in late antiquity and the medieval period. This created a demand for commentaries and scholia dealing with difficulties in the work, both in grammar and subject matter. The earliest Lucan scholia that have come down to us are the Commenta Bernensia and Adnotationes Super Lucanum, both from manuscripts datable between the 9th and 11th centuries. In spite of their late date, the Commenta and Adnotationes are thought to incorporate very ancient material, some of it now lost; both are known to contain material at least as old as Servius the Grammarian (4th century CE). Also interesting, though less credible, are comments from a Cologne codex (the Glossen ad Lucan), dating to the 11th and 12th centuries. Below are excerpts from these scholia relevant to Teutates:

Commentary	Latin	English
Commenta Bernensia ad Lucan, 1.445	Mercurius lingua Gallorum Teutates dicitur, qui humano apud illos sanguine colebatur. Teutates Mercurius sic apud Gallos placatur: in plenum semicupium homo in caput demittitur, ut ibi suffocetur.	In the language of the Gauls, Mercury is called Teutates, who was worshipped by them with human blood. Teutates Mercury is appeased by the Gauls in this way: a man is lowered headfirst into a small barrel (Note: The word used for the container that Teutates's victims were lowed into is semicupium. This word posed some difficulties for 19th century Celticists, as it is not found at all in classical Latin literature. It can be analysed as semi- ("half of a", diminutive-forming prefix) + cupa ("barrel"), and so probably denotes either a small barrel or half-barrel.) so that he suffocates there.
Commenta Bernensia ad Lucan, 1.445	item aliter exinde in aliis invenimus. Teutates Mars "sanguine diro" placatur, sive quod proelia numinis eius instinctu administrantur, sive quod Galli antea soliti ut aliis deis huic quoque homines immolare.	We also find it [depicted] differently by other [authors]. Teutates Mars is appeased with "grim blood-offering," either because the battles are directed by the impulse of his divine will, or because the Gauls used to sacrifice men to him as well as to other gods.
Adnotationes super Lucanum, 1.445	Teutates Mercurius sic dicitur, qui a Gallis hominibus caesis placatur.	Teutates is the name given to Mercury, who is appeased by the Gauls by killing people.
Glossen ad Lucan, 1.445	Teutates id est Mercurius, unde Teutonici.	Teutates, that is Mercury, whence the Teutons. (Note: The scholiast of the Glossen asserts some relationship between the god Teutates and the Germanic Teutons, but it is unclear what. Whatever his claim, it is certainly without foundation.)

The first excerpt, about the sacrifice to Teutates, comes from a passage in the Commenta which details the human sacrifices offered each of to the three gods (persons were suspended from a tree and dismembered for Esus, persons were burned in a wooden tub for Taranis). This passage, which is not paralleled anywhere else in classical literature, has been much the subject of much comment. It seems to have been preserved in the Commenta by virtue of its author's preference for factual (over grammatical) explanation. The Adnotationes, by comparison, tell us nothing about the sacrifices to Esus, Teutates, and Taranis beyond that they were each murderous.

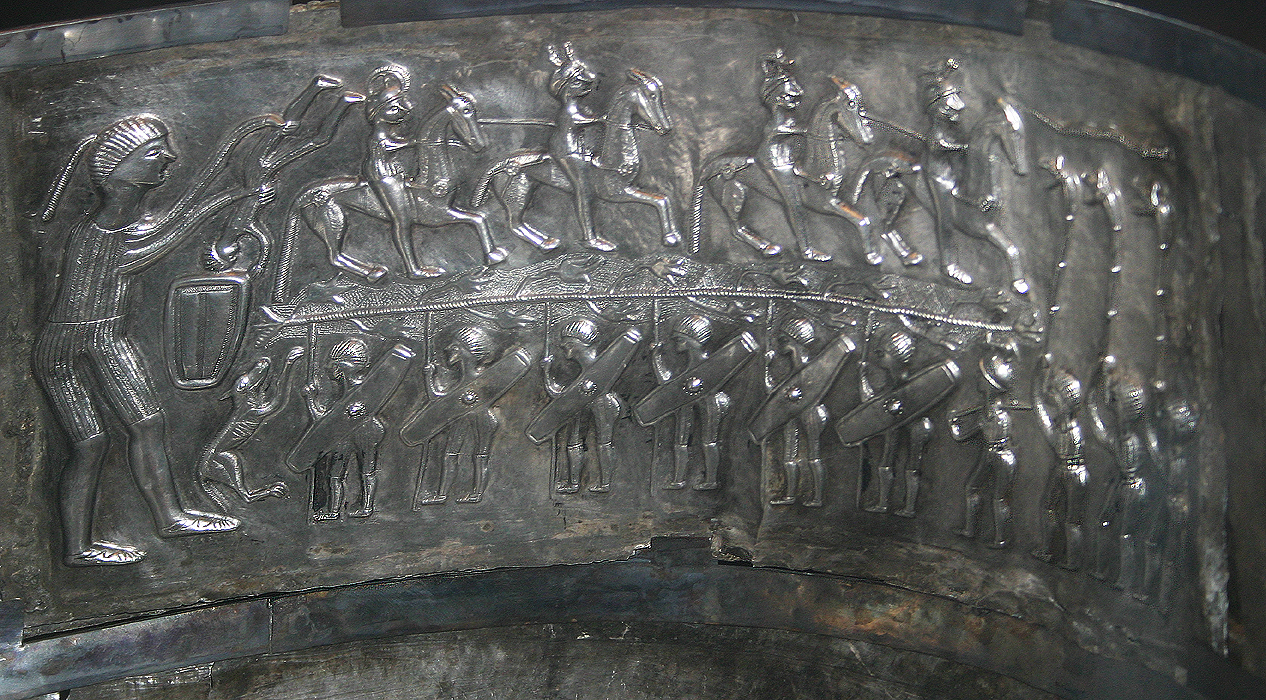
Interior plate E of the Gundestrup cauldron. To the left, a large man lowers a warrior headfirst into a container. To the right, warriors and horsemen with boar-crested helmets and carnyxes.

The sacrifice to Teutates described here has been repeatedly linked to the image on the Gundestrup cauldron of a large man immersing a warrior headfirst into a container. However, this connection must remain hypothetical, as the meaning of the scene surrounding this ritual is unknown to us, and we know nothing certain about the iconography of Teutates. (Note: We have no image which identifies itself as of Teutates. Émile Thévenot proposed to recognise Teutates in a depiction of a warrior on a stone monument from Mavilly-Mandelot. However, the lack of a legend identifying the figure leaves this identification quite uncertain.) Françoise Le Roux investigated the sacrificial barrel of Teutates through the various occurrences of cauldrons in medieval Irish mythology (variously beneficent, malevolent, and resurrectory). Jan de Vries connected this ritual with the habit of Irish heroes of drowning themselves in vessels when locked in burning houses. The violent end of the bog body known as the Lindow Man—throat slashed, strangled, bludgeoned, and drowned—has also been connected with this sacrificial ritual.

All three commentaries offer the interpretatio romana of Teutates as Mercury, Roman god of commerce. This interpretatio was repeated by the Latin lexicographer Papias in the middle of the 11th century CE. The scholiast of the Commenta, however, notes that other sources give an interpretatio of Teutates as Mars, (Note: The Commenta offers two sets of interpretatios of the three Celtic gods mentioned in Lucan. In the first set, Teutates is Mercury, Esus is Mars, and Taranis is Dis Pater. In the second set, Teutates is Mars, Esus is Mercury, and Taranis is Jupiter.) Roman god of war. The scholiast connects this second interpretatio with a story he sees in some sources, that Teutates's demand for human sacrifices was a demand for the blood of those slain in war; however, other sources before the scholiast tell him that Taranis's demand for human sacrifices was in analogy with the demands of other Gaulish gods.

The first interpretatio of Teutates as Mercury has caused a minority of scholars to identify Teutates with Caesar's Gaulish Mercury. However, the evident confusion of the sources the scholiast of the Commenta had available to him has been taken to count against the evidentiary value of either of these interpretatios. In epigraphy, the only Roman god paired with Teutates is Mars. However, similar bynames (Teutanus, Toutanicus, Toutiorix) are paired variously with Mercury, Apollo, Jupiter, and Mars. The practice of interpretatio was fairly flexible when applied to Celtic gods. Roman gods could have many Celtic equivalents and Celtic gods could have many Roman equivalents. In the Celtic provinces, Mars seems to have been a particularly multi-functional figure, carrying associations with fertility and healing as well as with war. In Gaul alone, Mars is given about 50 native epithets.

== Epigraphy ==
Text	Image	Context	Date	Citation	Comments
MARTI / TOUTATI / TI(BERIUS) CLAUDIUS PRIMUS / ATTII LIBER(TUS) / V(OTUM) S(OLVIT) L(IBENS) M(ERITO)		Inscribed on a votive silver plaque. Found in Barkway, Hertfordshire, England.	3rd century CE	CIL VII, 84 = RIB 219	Translated, this inscription reads "To Mars Toutatis, Tiberius Claudius Primus, freedman of Attius, willingly and deservedly fulfilled his vow.".
I(OVI) O(PTIMO) M(AXIMO) ET RIOCALAT(I) / [TO]UTAT(I) M / [AR(TI)] COCID(I)O / [VO]TO FECI / [T] VITA / [LIS]		Inscribed on a sandstone altar. Found in Cumbria, England.	2nd to 3rd century CE	CIL VII, 335 = RIB 1017	The number of separate deities named in the string Riocalati Toutati Marti Cocidio is uncertain. The editors of the Roman Inscriptions of Britain opt for three, and translate the inscription "To Jupiter, Best and Greatest, and to Riocalatis, Toutatis, and Mars Cocidius in fulfilment of a vow Vitalis made (this altar)."
MARTI / TOUTATI / S(ACRUM) VINOMA / V(OTUM) L(IBENS) S(OLVIT)		Inscribed on a tabula ansata. Precise find-spot unknown, but said to have been found near Hadrian's Wall.	2nd century CE	AE 2001, 1298 = RIB Brit.32.20	Translated, this reads "Sacred to Mars Toutatis. Vinoma willing(ly) paid a vow"
TOUTATIS		Inscribed on a (fragmentary) grey ware jar. Found in Kelvedon, Essex, England.	1st century CE (perhaps Flavian)?	RIB 2503.131	Miranda Green notes that, at the same site, pottery with stamped decoration of Celtic horsemen was found.
bisgontaurionanalabisbisgontaurion / ceanalabisbisgontaurioscatalages / uimcanimauimspaternamasta / magiaresetutateiustinaquem / peperit sarra		Inscribed on a silver plaque. Found in Poitiers, France.	5th century CE	RIG II.2 L-110 = CIL XIII, 10026,86	This Vulgar Latin text (with several Greek borrowings) is quite difficult to interpret. The first two lines seem to be a medical prescription, and the following lines some sort of magical formula. Christoph Dröge proposed that the fourth line contained an invocation of Teutates (in the form Tutate), an interpretation which has been followed by Patrizia de Bernardo Stempel, but not by Bernhard Maier or Pierre-Yves Lambert.
TOUTATI // SE(XTUS) COS(IUS) VEBR(US)		Inscribed on a bronze stylus. Found in Jort, Normandy, France.	1st century CE?	AE 2013, 1078	
(1) TOTATES (2) TOTA[...] (3) TOTATI[...] (4) TOTATIIS (5) [...]ATIIS		Inscribed on five pottery sherds. Found at the site of Beauclair, in Voingt, Auvergne, France.	2nd century CE?	AE 2009, 861	A vase found at the same archaeological site, now lost, has a text inscribed on it which may be another attestation of "Totates".
IN H(ONOREM) D(OMUS) D(IVINAE) / APOLLINI TOU/TIORIGI [...]		Inscribed on an altar. Found in Aquae Mattiacorum (Roman Wiesbaden), Germany.	222 to 235 CE	CIL XIII, 7564	This dedication to Apollo Toutiorix is the only epigraphic attestation of the epithet Toutiorix ("king of the tribe"), which is perhaps related to Teutates.
MARTI / LATOBIO / MARMOGIO // TOUTATI // SINATI MOG/[E]TIO C(AIUS) VAL(ERIUS) / [V]ALERINUS / EX VOTO		Inscribed on a votive tablet. Found in Seggau Castle, Styria, Austria	Second half of 2nd to first half of 3rd centuries CE	CIL III, 5320	This tablet gives a dedication to Mars Latobius Marmogius Sinatis Toutatis Mogetius. This string probably does not denote a single deity, as it would be unusual to attach five native bynames to one Roman god. De Bernardo Stempel has interpreted it as a votive inscription to two deities: Mars Latobius Marmogius and Sinatis Toutatis Mogetius. Adam Daubney has interpreted it as a votive inscription to five: Mars Latobius, Marmogius, Toutatis, Sinatis, Mogetius. The word Toutatis seems to have been added after the inscription was completed, inserted between two lines.
PETIGANUS / PLACIDUS / TOUTATI / MEDURINI / VOTUM SOL/VET ANNI/VERSARIUM		Inscribed on an altar. Found in Rome, Italy.	2nd century CE	CIL VI, 31182	Votive inscription to Toutati Medurini by one Petiganus Placidus. The site corresponds to an cantonment of the Roman legion, so the dedicant may have been a Celtic soldier. Meduri(ni)s, whose name is paired with Teutates's here, is an otherwise unknown deity.

The stone monuments to Teutates are clustered along the military frontier of the Roman Empire. The portable votive objects, by contrast, have mainly been found in shrine or domestic sites. The cult of Teutates is poorly attested in Gaul; the only certain inscriptions are on a stylus from Jort and five fragments of pottery from Beauclair. Patrice Lajoye and Claude Lemaitre point out that both Jort and Beauclair are on Gaulish tribal borders.

Not included in the above dossier are the attestations of the epithet Teutanus. Many votive altars dedicated to I(OVI) O(PTIMO) M(AXIMO) TEUTANO ("Jupiter Optimus Maximus Teutanus") (Note: CIL III, 10418; AE 1965, 349; AE 1991, 1324; AE 2005, 1408-1423.) have been found in the Danube Valley, with as many as 16 found in Gellért Hill alone. In Upper Germania, there are two attestations of a Mercurio Touteno (Note: CIL XIII, 6122; AE 1927, 70) and one attestation of a Deo Touteno. (Note: AE 1997, 1185) Perhaps related is a Mars Toutanicus, attested in Dacia. (Note: AE 2004, 1204) The nature of Teutanus is quite obscure. The word seems to mean "protector of the tribe". Andreas Hofeneder affirms that Teutates and Teutanus seem to be "linguistically and functionally closely related". Daniel Szabó proposed a local syncretisation of Teutates and Taranis.

=== TOT rings ===
As many as 68 finger rings with the letters TOT inscribed on them have been found in Britain. These date between the 2nd and 3rd centuries CE. The find-spots of these rings are concentrated around Lincolnshire and, more broadly, within the territory of the Corieltauvi tribe.

Emil Hübner, in an 1877 supplement to the Corpus Inscriptionum Latinarum, was the first to propose that these three letters should be read as an abbreviation of the deity-name Tot(atis). This suggestion was thereafter taken up by Anne Ross, Martin Henig and Jack Ogden, and Adam Daubney (of the Portable Antiquities Scheme). Three-letter inscriptions on Roman rings are common, and typically abbreviations of deity-names (for example MER for Mercury or MIN for Minerva). Two rings, found in the 2000s, which preface TOT with DEO ("God") have been taken to confirm that the god Teutates is referenced here.

However, other explanations of the inscription TOT have been given. Hübner proposed, as an alternative reading, that these rings abbreviated the charm tot (annos vivas) ("so many (years you live)"), a proposal which has been followed by Willi Göber and Hofeneder. Guy de la Bédoyère has given a number of additional Latin phrases that TOT could abbreviate. Henig and Ogden entertained the possibility that the letters "may be a vox magica", i.e., a meaningless set of letters supposed to have magical properties.

Henig and Ogden have pointed out that this TOT motif may appear on some 7th-century Saxon sceats.

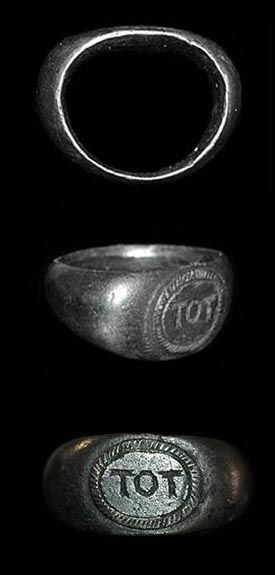
Silver TOT ring from Lincolnshire (Henig Type XI)

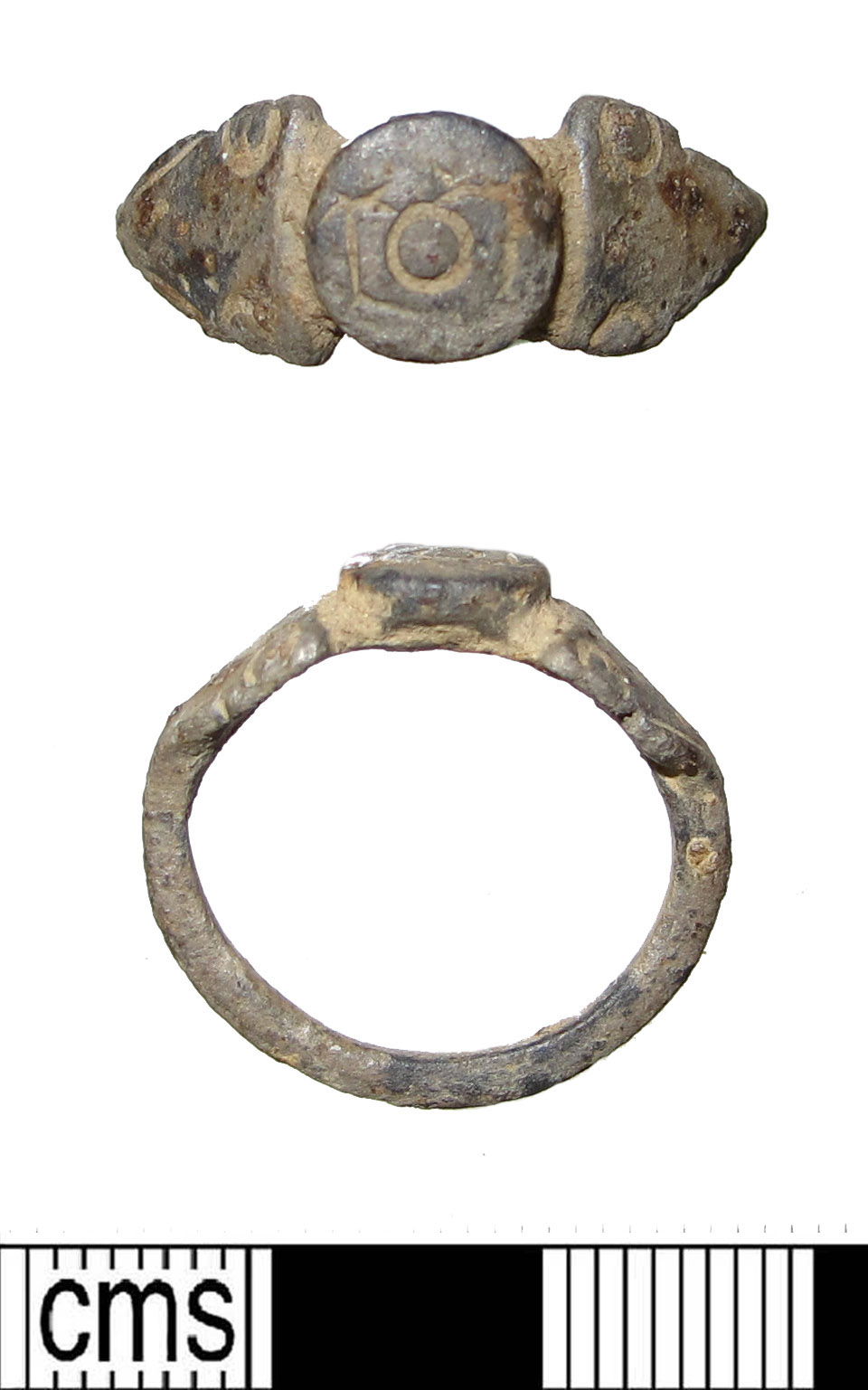
Silver TOT ring from Lincolnshire (Henig Type VIII)

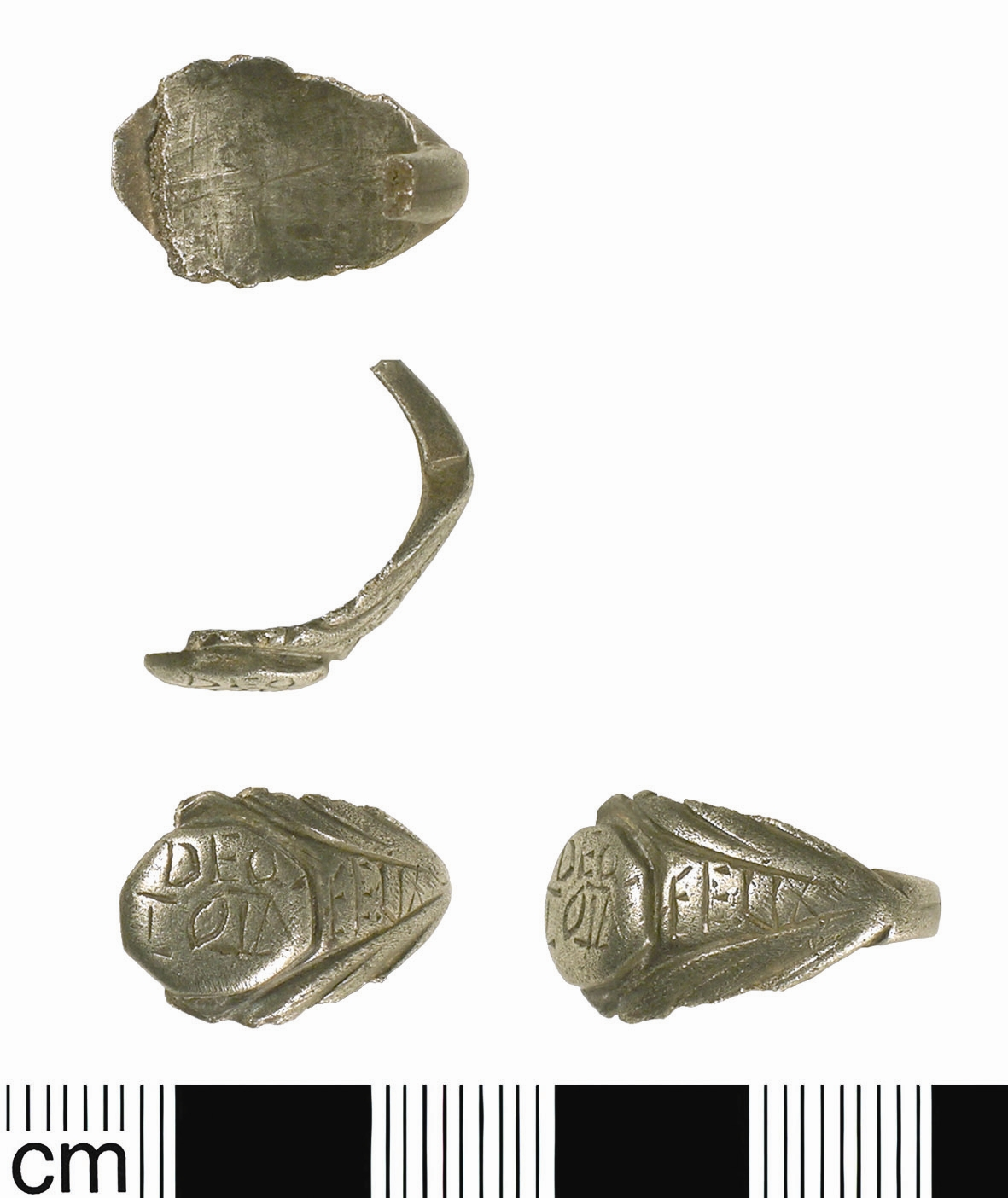
DEO TOTA ring from Hockliffe, Bedfordshire

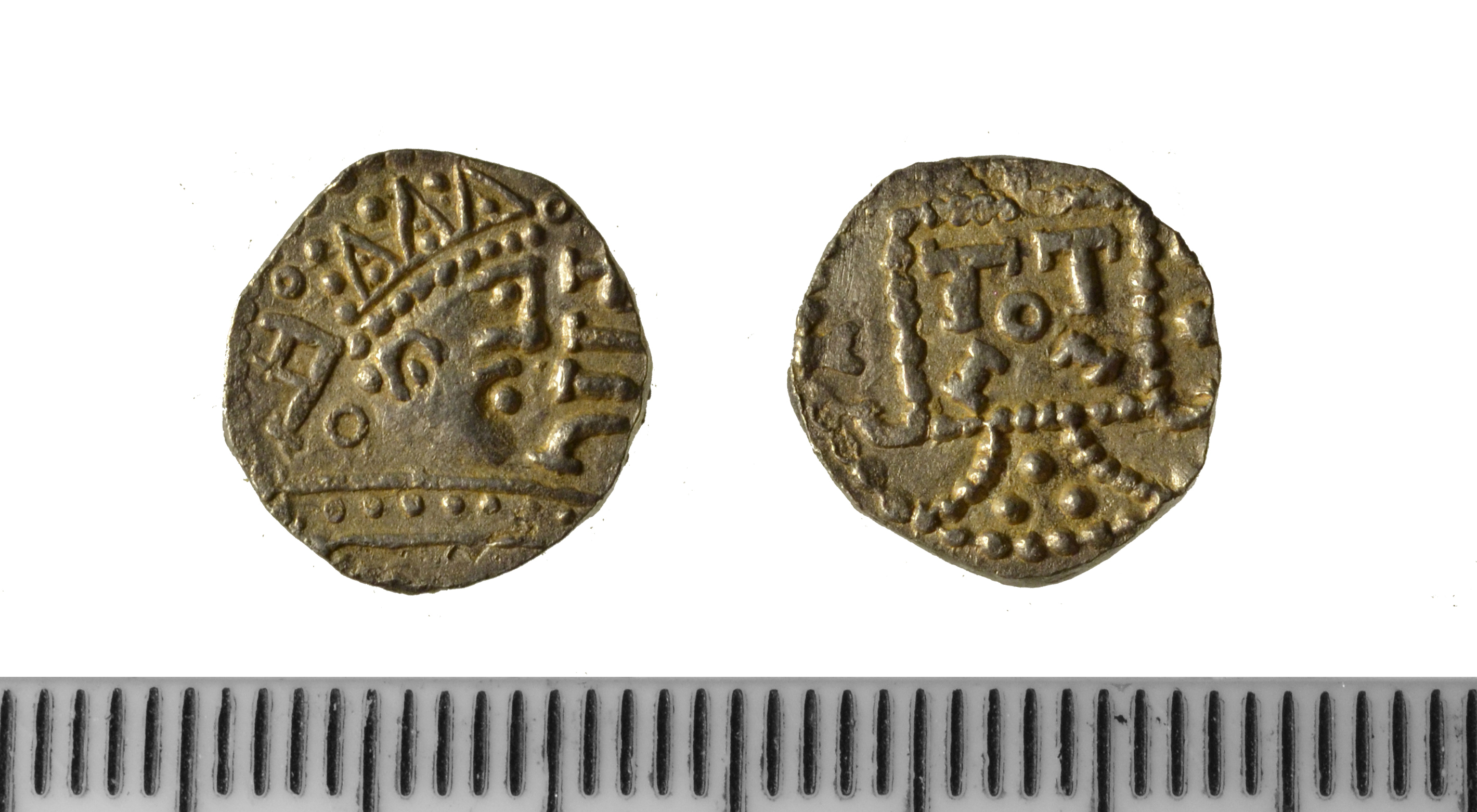
Saxon sceat with a TOT motif

== See also ==
- Lugus
