= Vacca (grammarian) =

Vacca was a 6th-century grammarian who studied and commented on the works of Lucan. Little is known of Vacca other than that he wrote Vita Lucani (Life of Lucan), which is not to be confused with Suetonius' Vita Lucani.

Vacca's commentaries were used in the medieval study of Lucan. Though he is not named, evidence of Vacca's writing appears in the 10th-century works Commenta Bernensia and Adnotationes super Lucanum.

Vacca's Life of Lucan gives sole accounts of many of Lucan's lost works, as well as accounts of the feud between Lucan and Nero, which agrees with Tacitus' and contradicts Suetonius'.
