= Titus Gallus =

Titus Gallus is an early Vergilian commentator, fl. in the 5th or 6th century. He is known only from a mention in the Berne scholia, haec omnia de commentariis Romanorum congregavi, id est Titi Galli et Gaudentii et maxime Iunilii Flagrii Mediolanensis.
