= Thauron =

Commune in Nouvelle-Aquitaine, France

- Commune
- Location of Thauron
- Location within France Location within Nouvelle-Aquitaine
- Coordinates: 46°00′03″N 1°49′07″E
- Country: France
- Region: Nouvelle-Aquitaine
- Department: Creuse
- Arrondissement: Guéret
- Canton: Ahun
- Intercommunality: CC Creuse Sud Ouest

Government
  - Mayor (2020–2026): Monique Caillaud
- Area^{1}: 22.34 km^{2} (8.63 sq mi)
- Elevation: 532 m (1,745 ft)
- Highest elevation: 632 m (2,073 ft)
- Lowest elevation: 390 m (1,280 ft)
- Population (2023): 166
  - Density: 7.43/km^{2} (19.2/sq mi)
- Time zone: UTC+01:00 (CET)
  - Summer (DST): UTC+02:00 (CEST)
- INSEE/Postal code: 23253 /23250
- ^{1} French Land Register data, which excludes lakes, ponds, glaciers > 1 km^{2} (0.386 sq mi or 247 acres) and river estuaries.

Thauron (French pronunciation: [toʁɔ̃]; Occitan: Tauron) is a commune in the Creuse department in the Nouvelle-Aquitaine region in central France.

== Geography ==
An area of forestry and farming comprising the village and several hamlets situated in the Taurion river valley some 13 miles (21 km) south of Guéret, at the junction of the D10, D60 and the D43 roads.

== Population ==
Historical population
Year	Pop.	±% p.a.
1968	225	—
1975	197	−1.88%
1982	169	−2.17%
1990	190	+1.47%
1999	189	−0.06%
2007	185	−0.27%
2012	181	−0.44%
2017	174	−0.79%
2023	166	−0.78%
Source: INSEE

== Sights ==
- The church, dating from the fifteenth century.
- The ruins of the thirteenth-century church of the abbey du Palais.
- The chapel de Bonneville
- The chapel in the park du Palais
- A monument to members of the French Resistance at the crossroads of the hamlet of Combeauvert.

== See also ==
- Communes of the Creuse department
