= Pieter Lambrechts =

Belgian historian and politician

Pieter Lambrechts (Laeken, 28 June 1910 – Brussels, 21 June 1974) was a Belgian historian and politician of the Party for Freedom and Progress (PVV).

== Biography ==
After completing his secondary education at the Royal Athenaeum of Ostend, Lambrechts went to Ghent University, where he obtained his doctorate in classical philology in 1932 and his doctorate in history in 1934. He was a lecturer at the University of Liège from 1944 to 1948 and a full professor in 1948, and a lecturer at the Université libre de Bruxelles in 1946 and a full professor in 1948. Lambrechts was also director of higher education at the Belgian Ministry of Public Education from 1945 to 1948, and a full professor at Ghent University in 1948. He was rector of Ghent University from 1957 to 1961.

At the Willemsfonds, he became vice-chairman in 1951 and chairman from 1962 to 1965. In 1965, he entered the Belgian Senate for the PVV and held this seat until 1968. He then led seven excavation campaigns in Pessinus (Turkey) between 1968 and 1974, which undermined his health and may have contributed to his relatively early death.

== Bibliography ==
- Contributions à l'étude des divinités celtiques, 1942. (under Pierre Lambrechts)
- L'exaltation de la tête dans la pensée et dans l'art des Celtes, 1954 (under Pierre Lambrechts)
- Het bevolkingsprobleem der universiteiten, 1956.
- Ons hoger onderwijs in de branding, 1957.
