= Epic catalogue =

Detailed lists in epic poetry

An epic catalogue is a long, detailed list of objects, places or people that is a characteristic of epic poetry.

== Examples ==
- In the Iliad:
  - Catalogue of Ships, the most famous epic catalogue
  - Trojan Battle Order
- In the Odyssey, the catalogue of women in Hades in Book XI.
- In the Argonautica, the catalogue of heroes in Book I.
- In the Aeneid, the list of enemies the Trojans find in Etruria in Book VII. Also, the list of ships in Book X.
- In Ovid's Metamorphoses, the catalogue of Actaeon's dogs (Book I) and of trees (Book X).
- In the Völuspá, the "Dvergatal" or catalogue of dwarfs.
- In The Faerie Queene, the list of trees I.i.8-9 and the list of rivers IV.xii.
- In Paradise Lost, the list of demons in Book I.
