= Commenta Bernensia and Adnotationes Super Lucanum =

Commentaries on Lucan

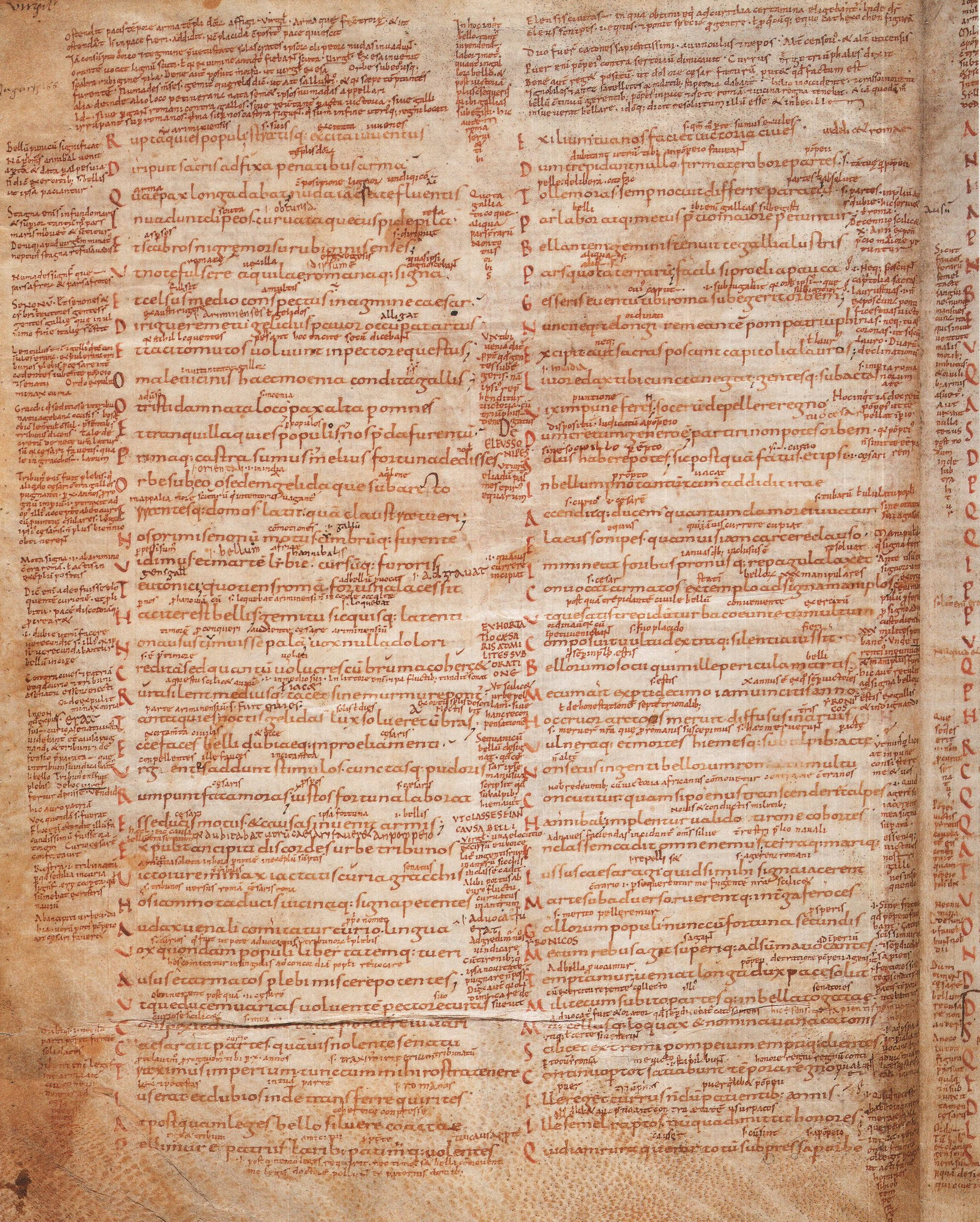
The text of Lucan's Pharsalia in the 9th-century manuscript Bern 45, with the Commenta Bernensia in the margins

The Commenta Bernensia and Adnotationes Super Lucanum are two 9th-century compilations of scholia (explanatory notes) on the Latin poet Lucan's Pharsalia.

Lucan's poem was very popular in late antiquity and the Middle Ages, which created a demand for commentaries and scholia. In the absence of a canonical late antique commentator, the scholia to Lucan were combined and elaborated at will by medieval scribes, creating a very diverse commentary tradition. The Commenta and Adnotationes, which have layers dating between the 4th and 9th century CE, are among the earliest such commentaries, and contain much information found nowhere else in classical literature.

== Background ==
=== Manuscript transmission of Lucan ===
Lucan's Pharsalia (the poet's only surviving, certainly-attributed work) was an intensely popular text from late antiquity to the Middle Ages, especially as a school text. The historical subject matter (Caesar's civil war) and heightened style appealed to readers of this era (though less so to readers from the Renaissance on). Some three or four hundred manuscripts survive. Though the work of Harold C. Gotoff has revealed something about the interrelationships of the earliest surviving manuscripts of Lucan (which date to the 9th century, works of the Carolingian Renaissance), the construction of traditional manuscript stemmata for Lucan is an acknowledged impossibility. Cross-contamination between manuscript traditions (where a scribe has multiple differing manuscripts, and picks and chooses readings in order to produce a composite text) is ubiquitous. A. E. Housman described the surviving manuscripts as forming "factions" rather than "families".

=== Commentary tradition to Lucan ===
Lucan's popularity created a demand for scholias and commentaries on his poem. The commentary tradition to Virgil, a poet of similar popularity in the Middle Ages, was fixed at an early stage around the work Servius the Grammarian (fl. 4th century). No such canonical commentator on Lucan survived into the Middle Ages, (Note: Servius is the only commentator whose work survived late antiquity in a complete form. A commentary on Lucan, mentioned by Jerome (fl. 5th-century, in adv. Rufin. 1.16), has not come down to us.) and thus the glosses to his poem varied greatly from manuscript to manuscript. Individual scribes subjected the glosses available to them to abridgement, elaboration, combination, and juxtaposition. Shirley Werner describes these marginal notes as "abundant and bewilderingly diverse".

From the 12th century onwards, we have several identifiable commentators on Lucan, such as Arnulf of Orléans (fl. 12th century), Ciones de Magnali (fl. 14th century), and Benvenuto Rambaldi da Imola (1330–1388). The identification of commentators on Lucan prior to the 12th century is controversial. The manuscript tradition attributes some glosses to Vacca, a 6th-century biographer of Lucan, an attribution which has been followed by some modern scholars such as Hermann Genthe and B. M. Marti. However, Werner and Marti point out that this tradition cannot be right about this attribution in all cases, as it attributes to Vacca some glosses of a clearly medieval, magical orientation.

== Commenta Bernensia and Adnotationes Super Lucanum ==
=== Manuscripts and publication ===
A late 9th-century manuscript (Bern 370) contains the Commenta Bernensia (under the heading Commenta) and a large amount of the Adnotationes Super Lucanum (under the heading Adnotationes). A 12th-century manuscript (Wallerstein I 2) contains the whole Adnotationes (again, under the heading Adnotationes). A peculiarity of these two manuscripts is that they give the commentaries in a continuous form (with titles), rather than as marginal notes to the text of Lucan. A 9th-century manuscript (Bern 45) gives a substantial portion of the Commenta in the more usual, marginal form.

The Commenta Bernensia were published in 1869 by Hermann Usener. The Adnotationes Super Lucanum were published in 1909 by Johann Endt.

- Usener, H. (1869). Scholia in Lucani Bellum civile, I: Commenta Bernensia (Reprinted 1967 ed.). Leipzig: Teubner.
- Endt, J. (1909). Adnotationes super Lucanum. Stuttgart: Teubner.

=== Relationship and sources ===
Scholars in the 19th and first half of the 20th century (such as Usener and Endt) were inclined to view the Commenta and Adnotationes as coherent and independent commentaries on Lucan. However, since the second half of the 20th century, most scholars accept the works as "essentially compilations of marginalia", rather than unified works. For example, Gotoff (1971) pointed out that the 9th-century Montpellier 362, the earliest manuscript of Lucan to contain any contemporary glossing, gives notes some of which appear in the Commenta, some of which appear in the Adnotationes, and some of which appear in neither. Werner makes a similar point with the 9th-century Bern 45. Whether the Commenta and Adnotatones have many sources, or, as J. E. G. Zetzel suggested in 1981, descend from a common ancestor, is debated.

The Commenta and Adnotationes contain information preserved nowhere else in surviving classical literature, the Commenta moreso, as it focuses on content-based glosses of the material, rather than grammatical glosses. The earliest layers of the two scholia date to the 4th-century CE or Late Roman Empire, the latest to the 9th century CE. The sources of this information have been much discussed. It is accepted that both rely on Servius. The extent to which they rely on Sallust, Livy, and Varro has been debated.

Both commentaries provide valuable information relating to the Celtic gods Teutates, Esus, and Taranis (in Lucan, the rare example of a reference in classical literature to barbarian gods under their own names). The Commenta, uniquely, tells us the nature of the human sacrifices to these gods. (Note: For more on this subject, see the respective sections on the Lucan scholia in the articles on Teutates, Esus, and Taranis.) The Commenta also contains an otherwise unattested fragment of the lost work of Timosthenes, a 3rd-century BCE Greek geographer.

== Other published Lucan scholia ==
Philipp Jaffé and Wilhelm Wattenbach (1874) edited the scholia from a Cologne manuscript of the 11th or 12th century, which are written in a rather non-standard Latin and with many unlikely explanations of the passages. G. A. Cavajoni published three volumes (1979, 1984, 1990) of Lucan scholia not otherwise included in the Adnotations and Commenta. Werner (1998) edited and translated the Lucan scholia from Beinecke MS 673, an Italian manuscript of the late 11th/early 12th century which she deems "representative".

- Jaffé, Philippus; Wattenbach, Guilelmus (1874). Ecclesiae metropolitanae Coloniensis codices manuscripti. Berlin.
- Cavajoni, G. A. (1979). Supplementum adnotationum super Lucanum, I: Libri I–V. Testi e Documenti per lo studio dell’Antichità. Vol. 63. Milan: Cisalpino-Goliardica.
- Cavajoni, G. A. (1984). Supplementum adnotationum super Lucanum, II: Libri VI–VII. Testi e Documenti per lo studio dell’Antichità. Vol. 63, 2. Milan: Cisalpino-Goliardica.
- Cavajoni, G. A. (1990). Supplementum adnotationum super Lucanum, III: Libri VIII–X. Amsterdam: Hakkert.
- Werner, S. (1998). The Transmission and Scholia to Lucan's Bellum Civile. Münsteraner Beiträge zur Klassischen Philologie. Piscataway, NJ: Transaction Publishers. pp. 84–124.

== Bibliography ==
- Elvers, K.; Vessey, D. T. (2006). "Lucanus". Brill's New Pauly Online. Brill. doi:10.1163/1574-9347_bnp_e710250.
- Esposito, Paolo (2011). "Early and Medieval Scholia and Commentaria on Lucan". In Asso, Paolo (ed.). Brill's Companion to Lucan. Brill. pp. 453–463. doi:10.1163/9789004217096_025.
- Graf, Fritz (1991). "Menschenopfer in der Burgerbibliothek: Anmerkungen zum Götterkatalog der »Commenta Bernensia« zu Lukan 1, 445". Archäologie der Schweiz. 14: 136–143. doi:10.5169/seals-12564.
- Hiatt, Alfred (2016). "Lucan". In Copeland, Rita (ed.). The Oxford History of Classical Reception in English Literature: Volume 1: 800–1558. Oxford: Oxford University Press. doi:10.1093/acprof:oso/9780199587230.003.0011.
- Hofeneder, Andreas (2008). Die Religion der Kelten in den antiken literarischen Zeugnissen. Vol. 2. Wien: Verlag der Österreichischen Akademie der Wissenschaften.
- Shipley, D. Graham J. (2024). Geographers of the Ancient Greek World: Selected Texts in Translation. Vol. 1. Cambridge: Cambridge University Press. ISBN 9781009239868.
- Werner, Shirley (1994). "On the History of the Commenta Bernensia and the Adnotationes Super Lucanum". Harvard Studies in Classical Philology. 96: 343–368. JSTOR 311330.
- Werner, S. (1998). The Transmission and Scholia to Lucan's Bellum Civile. Münsteraner Beiträge zur Klassischen Philologie. Piscataway, NJ: Transaction Publishers.
