= Papias (lexicographer) =

Italian Latin lexicographer

Papias (fl. 1040s–1060s) was a Latin lexicographer from Italy. Although he is often referred to as Papias the Lombard, little is known of his life, including whether he actually came from Lombardy. The Oxford History of English Lexicography considers him the first modern lexicographer for his monolingual dictionary (Latin-Latin), Elementarium Doctrinae Rudimentum, written over a period of ten years in the 1040s. The Elementarium has been called "the first fully recognizable dictionary" and is a landmark in the development of dictionaries as distinct from mere collections of glosses. Papias arranges entries alphabetically based on the first three letters of the word, and is the first lexicographer to name the authors or texts he uses as sources. Although most entries are not etymological, Papias laid the groundwork for derivational lexicography, which became firmly established only a century later.

Start of the Elementarium in the manuscript BnF Latin 17162

Papias seems to have been a cleric with theological interests, possibly living in Pavia. The name "Papias" means "the guide", and may be a pseudonym or pen name. Bruno of Würzburg saw an early draft of the Elementarium before he died in 1045, but an unambiguous reference in the chronicle of Albericus Trium Fontium establishes that it was published by 1053.

== Elementarium doctrinae ==
Papias set forth his principles in a preface to his dictionary and contributes new features to lexicography. He marks vowel length in the word entry when ambiguous, and notes the gender and declension or conjugation, recognizing that the lemma may be insufficient for grammatical usage. He does not, however, distinguish between Classical and Vulgar Latin forms. Although he pays little attention to etymology, he provides definitions of legal terms, and gives excerpts from earlier glossaries such as the Liber glossarum and from textbooks of the liberal arts and logic. Of greater general interest, Papias provides often copious examples and discursive information for each word, and should probably be regarded as an encyclopedist as much as a lexicographer.

Papias renders Greek words and quotations into Latin, including five lines of Hesiod that he translates into Latin hexameters; this, however, may be an interpolation by an editor of the 1485 Venice edition. Although his efforts to deal with Greek are significant, his examples are "often imperfectly understood and interpreted."

The Elementarium anticipated some principles of derivational lexicography (disciplina derivationis), that is, a method that generates vocabulary through verbal analogy. The goal is not only to learn the main word in the entry, but to be able to derive other forms of the word. The method had been illustrated earlier by Priscian in his Partitiones duodecim versuum Aeneidos principalium.

== Sources and influences ==
Among the sources used by Papias in addition to Priscian were Isidore of Seville, Boethius, the Physiologus, Remigius of Auxerre, the glossary of Pseudo-Philoxenus, and Carolingian commentaries on Martianus Capella and classical authors such as Terence. Papias's work was widely used throughout the Middle Ages and into the 16th century, and was a source for Hugutio of Pisa, Johannes Balbus, and Johannes Reuchlin. It was so popular that more than a hundred manuscripts survive, and the name of its author became a synonym for vocabularium. Erasmus, however, disparaged Papias and similar writers for the lack of intellectual rigor in their pedagogy.

== Manuscripts and editions ==
The main study of the manuscript tradition is B. Zonta, "I codici GLPV dell' Elementarium Papiae: un primo sondaggio nella tradizione manoscritta ed alcune osservazioni relative," Studi Classici e orientali 9 (1960) 76–99. The extremely rare first edition of the Elementarium was published 1476 in Milan. The better-known Venice editions were printed in 1485, 1491, and 1496. The edition of 1496 was published 1966 by Bottega d'Erasmo in Turin. Papias is also credited with an Ars grammatica that exists in 41 manuscripts. Violetta de Angelis wrote a critical edition of the *Elementarium* in 1977, left unfinished.
