= Soldurios =

Sworn warrior-companions of a chief in ancient Celtic society

Soldurios (Latin soldurius, plural soldurii) is a term used for a sworn companion who devoted his life to a chief in ancient Celtic society. According to Caesar, soldurii shared in all the goods of their leader's life and bound themselves to share his death, dying with him or taking their own lives if he was killed. Caesar describes a body of six hundred such men attached to Adiatuanus, chief of the Aquitanian Sotiates. The same custom appears to be recorded among the Celtic peoples of the Iberian Peninsula, where the Roman writers called the bond a devotio, a solemn act of self-devotion. Modern writers treat the tie as the most binding form of Celtic clientship and as an extreme form of the looser ambactos. Some set it within the wider Männerbunde, the Indo-European sworn warrior bands. Some scholars caution that the devotio described by ancient authors is not properly Celtiberian or Celtic, but shared by several ancient societies, including non-Indo-European ones.

== Name ==
The name is known above all from Caesar's Gallic War, where soldurii is given as the native word for the devoted companions of the chief Adiatuanus among the Aquitanian Sotiates, in the campaign of 56 BC. The historian Nicolaus of Damascus, retelling the same episode, calls the Sotiates Celts and renders the word as 'those who have taken a vow'. (Note: Nicolaus's version, preserved by Athenaeus from the 116th book of his Histories, almost certainly derives from Caesar's, and Andreas Hofeneder holds its divergences to carry no independent weight. The further details, that the companions shared the king's dress and his rule and died with him whatever the cause of his death, are Nicolaus's own, and his calling the Sotiates a Celtic people is generally taken to be his error, the Sotiates being Aquitani.)

The origin of the word has been disputed, and it has sometimes been considered a non-Celtic Aquitanian word, a view rejected by Joaquín Gorrochategui, a specialist of the Aquitanian language. Andreas Hofeneder judges that soldurii is probably not a Celtic word and that its origin cannot be settled, the leader's name Adiatuanus being the one securely Celtic element.

Alfred Holder regarded the word as Celtic, and compared it with a partly restored legend on a coin of the British king Cunobelinus, read Cuno[belinos] Solidu[ros]. Xavier Delamarre likewise lists it as a Gaulish word he interprets as 'bodyguard, faithful man, devoted follower', while noting that its etymology remains unsettled. Pierre-Yves Lambert holds that the recorded form soldurios may have been reshaped under the influence of the Latin words solidus and solidarius, and underlay a Gaulish *soliturios. He glosses the element solitu- as 'purchase', or the wage paid to a hired man, and compares the word to the divine epithet Solitumaros, the tribal name Coriosolitae, and the Old Breton solt ('sou'). (Note: Lambert raises, tentatively, the possibility that the financial senses of Latin solidus, a cash payment, a soldier's pay and the late-antique sou, owe something to Gaulish solitu- 'wealth' and 'a soldier's pay'.)

== Description ==
=== Sotiates ===
The word soldurius is reported by Caesar in connection with Crassus' campaign against the Aquitanian Sotiates.

Adiatuanus, who held the overall command, along with six hundred followers—they call them 'soldurii', and the terms of their position are as follows. In life they enjoy every advantage in company with the men to whose friendship they have dedicated themselves, but if anything happens to the latter under duress they either suffer that outcome with them or ordain death for themselves. No one has ever yet in human memory been found who refused death when the man to whose friendship he was pledged had been killed.

— Caesar, De Bello Gallico, 3.22

According to Caesar, soldurii enjoyed in common every good thing of the life of the man to whose friendship they had committed themselves, and if he met a violent death they either shared his fate or took their own lives. Within living memory, Caesar adds, no one had ever refused to die once the man to whom he had devoted himself was dead. Adiatuanus was attended by six hundred of them, a strikingly large following, since the comparable Gaulish bands of the period were far smaller.

Caesar's account presents the soldurii as a chief's personal guard. Jean-Louis Brunaux stresses that the tie binding them was not one of simple hierarchy but a strong personal bond, as much of kinship as of friendship, in his view closer to the comradeship of hoplites than to Roman clientela, and one that the Latin word cliens could not render. Venceslas Kruta treats the soldurii bond as an intensified form of the ordinary ambactus relationship and the most extreme grade of Celtic clientship.

=== Iberian Peninsula ===
Ancient writers record the same readiness to die with a leader among the peoples of the Iberian Peninsula. The bond is attested among the Celtiberians, the Lusitani, the Vettones and the Cantabri. Strabo reports the Iberian custom of men consecrating their lives to the leaders they attached themselves to. Valerius Maximus, probably following Sallust, records that the Celtiberians held it a sin to survive in battle the chief to whose safety they had vowed their lives. Plutarch describes Sertorius as followed by many thousands of Hispani sworn to die with him. Gabriel Sopeña reads this Celtiberian devotio as a specific military bond, close to the Gaulish soldurii, in which the devotees consecrated their lives to the gods to follow their leader and share his victory or his death.

Whether Caesar's term extends to these Hispanic devoti is disputed. Manuel Salinas and Kruta take soldurii as the native name of the Iberian devoti. Andreas Hofeneder holds instead that the word is properly Aquitanian, naming only the companions of the Sotiates. On his account the devotio was the mark of no single people but a shared institution, attested for Gauls, Aquitani, Celtiberians, Iberians and Germans alike, so that the term should not be carried beyond Aquitania and the older label devotio iberica to be set aside.

Salinas stresses that this Hispanic devotio was not the Roman religious rite of the same name, by which a general consecrated an enemy's land to the gods of the underworld. In the Celtic bond it was the devotee's own life that was offered to the underworld god in place of the leader's.

== Interpretation ==
Pierre-Yves Lambert reads the tie as economic as well as religious. In his analysis the word soldurios itself names the 'purchase', or the wage, for which the companion pledges his life. He compares the war-band of the Gododdin in Aneirin's poem Y Gododdin, warriors who let themselves be bought by their lord's mead, and sets the bond beside the Gaulish tribe Coriosolitae, a name he takes to mean 'those who hire soldiers'. On this reading armorican gold paid for such mercenaries.

Karl Peschel sets the soldurii within the sworn Indo-European men's society, or Männerbund, and reads their bond as a Celtic form of the war-retinue, the Gefolgschaft. He holds the Celtic tie distinct from the Germanic retinue: the Germanic follower was bound only not to leave the field once his lord had fallen, as Tacitus reports, whereas the soldurii were bound to seek a common death. (Note: Peschel finds the vow kept in the literary record. Polybius has Aneroestes take his own life with his close following after the Celtic defeat at Telamon in 225 BC, and Caesar reports the small oath-bound bands around the Arvernian Litaviccus and the Atrebatian Commius.) He grounds the institution in the princely burials of the late Hallstatt culture, reading the Hochdorf grave of the later 6th century BC as the setting of the retinue-feast at which such bonds were formed. (Note: The grave held a wagon set with bronze vessels, nine drinking horns, and a couch bearing a frieze of paired sword-fighters.) Jean-Louis Brunaux and others likewise set the whole institution within a wider Indo-European pattern of personal dependency and warrior bands.

Peschel also links their readiness to die with the druidic teaching that the soul survives death: the pledge, on this reading, reached into the afterlife and was honourable rather than degrading. (Note: Peschel cites the ancient reports of the doctrine. Strabo holds the souls of men and the world itself indestructible, and Lucan that in another world the same spirit governs the body, that death is the midpoint of a long life, and that the peoples of the north do not fear death. Both Caesar and Diodorus connect the druidic teaching on the soul's passage with the contempt for death shown by the Celts in battle.) He places beside this a practice reported by Posidonios and quoted by Athenaeus, set in southern Gaul before the Roman conquest, in which certain men received silver, gold and jars of wine before the assembled people, pledged their loyalty, made over the gifts to their kinsmen, stretched out on their backs upon their shields, and had their throats cut by a companion standing over them. (Note: The Greek has the companion strike off the man's laimos ('throat'), which some have read as decapitation rather than a cutting of the throat.) Marcel Mauss read the ritual death as the supreme return-gift within an archaic economy of exchange, the man discharging by his public death the obligation to repay what he had received, in a way honourable to himself and profitable to his kin.

== See also ==
- Ambactus
- Celtic clientship
- Devotio
- Gaesatae
- Männerbund
