= Celtic clientship =

Institution of personal dependency in the ancient Celtic world

Celtic clientship was an institution of personal dependency in the ancient Celtic world, binding a person or tribe of lower standing to a more powerful patron. The patron gave protection and support, and the client owed loyalty, service and, in war, an armed following. Such ties were reciprocal but unequal. They could bind not only individuals but whole peoples, a weaker tribe entering the clientela of a stronger one. In both Gallic and Celtiberian societies, a nobleman's standing was measured by the number of his dependants, and the gathering of clients was the chief means by which aristocratic power was built and held.

Similar institutions of this type are recorded among the Gauls and the Celtiberians by Greek and Roman writers of the 2nd and 1st centuries BC, and among the early Irish by the medieval law tracts. In Gaul the sources distinguish two grades of dependant, the servile ambactos and the freer clientes, together with an extreme sworn form, the soldurios, who pledged their lives to a chief. These ties were stacked into networks of dependence reaching from a single follower up to whole client peoples. Their manipulation played a large part in the Roman conquest. Among the Celtiberians a native pact of hospitality (hospitium) could harden into clientship, and warriors bound themselves to a chief by a consecration the Romans called devotio. In early Ireland the law tracts set out a base and a free grade of client, each receiving from his lord a fief, usually of cattle, in return for food-renders and service.

Because the same pattern of lords and dependants recurs across these societies, modern scholars count clientship among the defining features of Celtic social organisation. The comparison is qualified, however, by the different periods and very different kinds of source to which the continental and the insular evidence belong, and the Roman vocabulary through which much of it reaches us, and the absence of comparable institution in early Wales. Some scholars have placed the whole institution within a wider Indo-European pattern of personal dependency and warrior bands known as Männerbunde.

== Terminology ==
In modern writing the relationship is usually called clientship or clientage, from the Latin clientela used by the Greek and Roman authors who described it. Those authors named the Celtic bond in the language of their own society, that of the 'patron' (patronus) and the 'client' (cliens), and modern historians caution that this Roman vocabulary can make the Celtic institution look more like its Roman namesake than it really was. As such, Jean-Louis Brunaux finds clientship too narrow a word, since it evokes the political dependence of Roman public life. He proposes 'vassalage', which gives more weight to the reciprocity and the personal honour on which the tie rested.

The ancient Celts had their own words to describe such relations, two of which survive in Gaulish forms. An ambactos (Latinised as ambactus, plural ambacti; 'one who goes about his lord') was an armed dependant attached to a great man. The word passed into Latin, where Festus explained it as the Gaulish term for a servus, a servant or bondsman. A soldurios (Latin soldurius, plural soldurii) was one of the sworn companions who pledged to share a chief's fate to the death. The Roman writers called the pledge itself a devotio, a solemn act of self-devotion. Caesar records soldurii among the Aquitanian Sotiates, and the word appears again on a British coin, in the legend Cuno[belinos] Solidu[ros]. In early Irish law, the client is the céile, of whom the law-texts distinguish two grades, the 'client of submission' (dóerchéile) and the 'free client' (sóerchéile).

Celtic clientship system
Native term	Graeco-Latin designations (Note: The designations gathered here are the terms Graeco-Roman writers applied to these Celtic institutions, not their exact equivalents. The Greek, Latin and Celtic classifications do not correspond one to one.)	Caesarian class (Note: Daphne Nash argues that Caesar reduced the fuller scheme of the Posidonian tradition, which ranked warriors, druids, bards, vates and companions above a lower stratum of poor clients (therapontes), charioteers, shield-bearers and other attendants, to three classes: the equites (the noble patrons at the head of society), the druids and the plebs.)	Role	Proposed Irish equivalent (Note: The pairings in this column are structural parallels drawn by modern scholars, not exact equations. In the Irish law-tracts a lord (flaith) held both free clients (sóerchéile) and base clients (dóerchéile).)	References
Not known (aristocrat, patron) (Note: A possible Gaulish term survives in the compound arganto-comaterecos, where the second element is a name of office. Delamarre glosses comaterecos as 'senator, patrician, patron', following Pierre-Yves Lambert, who reads it as a title, com-ater-ecos with ater from *pater- and a suffix recalling Latin patricius.)	patronus	equites	The patron at the head of the relationship, who gave protection and support to his dependants and led them to war. His standing and legal weight were reckoned by the number of clients he could gather.	flaith	
Not known (free clients	clientela, therapontes	plebs	Kept his own legal personality, but paid higher dues than the ambactos and owed homage with service in war and peace.	sóerchéile	
Ambactos	servus, coloni, lixae, familia, familiaris	plebs	Free and armed, yet close to serfdom: surrendered his legal personality for payment or for debt, and had to follow his lord to war. (Note: Kruta stresses that the ambacti were close to serfdom but not, as Caesar supposed, the outright property of their lord.)	dóerchéile	
Soldurios	devotio	—	Sworn companion who shared all the benefits of his leader's life and was bound, if the leader met a violent death, to die with him or take his own life.	? fíana (Note: This pairing rests on a shared warrior institution rather than on the graded clientship of the other rows. Karl Peschel places the soldurii within the sworn men's warrior-society, the Männerbund. Kim McCone reads the Irish fían, the roving band of unmarried young warrior-hunters, as a reflex of the same Indo-European institution.)	

== Sources ==
No ancient account of clientship survives from within Celtic society itself. On the Continent the institution is chiefly known from Greek and Roman ethnography. Posidonios (c. 135–51 BC) treated the Celts in his lost Histories, which can be recovered only in part through later authors such as Diodorus, Strabo and Athenaeus. Polybius had already remarked on clientship in the 2nd century BC, and Caesar described it from direct knowledge of Gaul.

Daphne Nash argues that Caesar should be read as an authority in his own right rather than as a mere copyist of Posidonios, since he had spent years in Gaul and was describing a later and different society. On this view his account of the Gaulish social classes in De Bello Gallico makes sense in itself and is borne out by the narrative of the war, in which clientship is seen in action again and again. Nash also holds that clientship was a lasting social institution and not, as J. J. Tierney had suggested, a mere literary motif taken over from an earlier writer. She notes that the fuller Posidonian picture of the upper classes, made up of warriors, druids, bards, vates and companions, was reduced by Caesar to two, the equites and the druids, with the poorer clients gathered into a single half-servile plebs.

For Ireland the evidence is the early Irish law tracts, above all Cáin Aicillne ('the law of base clientship'), which sets out base and free clientship in legal detail.

== Ancient Celts ==
=== Gaul ===
In Gaul, clientship was the principal thread of political life. It was a personal bond between two men of unequal standing: the greater offered protection and support, the lesser gave loyalty, service and, above all, a following in war. Nico Roymans describes it as a form of patronage, a tie that was reciprocal, in that each side owed the other something, but unequal, in that the two stood on different rungs of society. The command of a large body of clients was the foundation on which a nobleman's power rested. Such ties reached from the follower of a single lord up to whole peoples, a weaker tribe placing itself in the clientela of a stronger, and together they ran through the whole of Gaulish public and military life.

Within a great man's following, Caesar and the Greek writers distinguish two grades of dependant. The heavier grade were the ambacti. Venceslas Kruta describes an ambactus as a man, free by birth, who for payment or to clear a debt gave up his own standing at law to a rich and powerful patron, who from then on answered for him in every legal matter. He was close to a serf, though not, as Caesar believed, the outright property of his lord. He still carried arms, the mark of a free man, and in return was bound to follow his patron to war. The word was later rendered in Latin as servus ('slave'), showing how heavy this dependence could grow. The lighter grade were the clientes proper, who kept their own standing at law but paid higher dues and owed their patron homage and service in peace and war. Because cliens was also the ordinary Roman word for any dependant, it serves in the sources in two senses at once, naming both the relationship as a whole and, more narrowly, this freer grade set beside the ambacti. The Greek ethnographic tradition likewise reports at least two grades of client, one more respectable than the other. Beyond these two ordinary grades stood an extreme form of the tie, the sworn soldurios, who devoted his very life to a chief. This bond is recorded among the Aquitanian Sotiates, whose chief Adiatuanus was attended by a body of soldurii sworn to share every good thing of his life and, if he met a violent death, to die with him or take their own lives. As it was sealed by an act of devotio and carrying the duty to follow the patron even into death, Kruta treats it as an intensified form of the ambactus relationship. He notes that the same custom was widespread among the Celts of the Iberian peninsula.

Roymans distinguishes three levels within this web of patronage. The first was clientship between noble leaders and people of lower rank, free and unfree, who lived mainly by their own farming but could also be called on for military service. The second was clientship within the nobility itself, seen in the armed retinue, or Gefolgschaft, of a leader and in the political factions (factiones) that Caesar describes, such as the rival pro-Roman and anti-Roman parties of the Treveri under Cingetorix and Indutiomarus. The third was clientship between whole peoples, as when many tribes joined the clientela of the Remi during the war. The stacking of these ties produced what Roymans calls 'clientage pyramids', networks of vertical dependence that cut across tribal boundaries.

A nobleman's importance was measured by his following. Polybius reports that a Celt was reckoned by the number of his clients and friends, and that friendship was the value most prized. Kruta observes that the prestige and legal weight of a high-ranking aristocrat depended on the number of ambacti and clients attached to him. The relationship was material and social and, as Caesar notes, also religious in its basis. The retinue was kept up by open-handed generosity and, where need be, by plunder. Roymans notes that Dumnorix was constantly attended by a large private retinue of horsemen whom he maintained at his own charge, his popularity resting on his lavish giving (largitio). David Rankin cites Orgetorix, who is said to have had a familia together with many clients and dependants, whose loyalty was the basis of his power among the Helvetii. In the same passage Caesar sets three grades within Orgetorix's following, the familia of his household, the clientes proper, and his debtors, an order Brunaux reads as one of decreasing personal closeness. Debt was itself a road into dependence. Caesar reports that commoners crushed by debt, tribute or the exactions of the powerful gave themselves into servitium to the nobles. Alain Daubigney treats the debtor (obaeratus) of the Helvetian threefold group of familia, clientes and obaerati as a standing means by which the powerful drew clients from the common people.

Clientship was accordingly the central mechanism of aristocratic power, though not the only one. Kruta notes that the Gaulish aristocracy of the 1st century BC controlled political and economic life not only through clientship but also through taxation and a monopoly on the striking of coin, as in the case of the Aeduan Dumnorix. The bond could also be enforced by force: Rankin cites Caesar's report that Vercingetorix raised his army by threats of death and mutilation. Not long before Caesar's time it had been the custom to burn a chief's clients and slaves on his funeral pyre.

The Roman conquest turned on these ties. Kruta notes that Caesar exploited the weakness of the clientship links and alliances that held the Gaulish coalitions together, and that after the conquest Rome favoured the freeing of small peoples once bound in clientship to great civitates, which may explain the appearance of peoples unattested in Caesar's day such as the Tricasses and the Catalauni. Territory itself could be spoken of as a client's: the reputedly impregnable stronghold of Uxellodunum is said to have belonged to the clientela of the Cadurcan Lucterius. Under the early Empire the language of clientship still described Gaulish society: in AD 68 Vindex was supported by many chieftains and their thousands of clients.

=== Celtiberia ===
The Greek and Roman writers credit the Celtiberians with two native institutions of personal dependence, hospitium and clientship. Hospitium was a pact of hospitality: a solemn and often hereditary bond of mutual guest-friendship between two communities, or between a person and a community, recorded on inscribed bronze tokens (tesserae hospitales) written in Iberian and in Celtiberian. Manuel Salinas de Frías treats it as genuinely native to Spain, distinct from the Roman institution of the same name, and shows that, as wealth came to differ between the parties, a pact of this kind could harden into a relationship of dependence close to clientship. Martín Almagro-Gorbea and Alberto Lorrio treat personal clientship as a structural feature of Celtiberian society which, fitted to a stock-raising economy, gave the whole society a warrior character. In their account a 'clientelar army', a force raised from a chief's own clients, marks a stage between the earlier war-bands and the later town and mercenary armies. In so competitive a society, the number of a chief's clients was a mark of his standing, and army leaders were drawn from the nobility, to whom picked warriors were bound by solemn ritual.

A distinct and extreme form of the bond was the warrior-consecration that the Roman writers call devotio, by which warriors pledged their lives to a chief and might not outlive him. It is attested among Celtiberians, Lusitani, Vettones and Cantabri, and has been likened to the Gaulish soldurii mentioned by Caesar. Salinas links the bond to the Iberian custom, reported by Strabo, of men consecrating their lives to the leaders they attached themselves to. He traces it under Sertorius, who according to Plutarch was followed by many thousands of Hispani sworn to die with him, and holds that the consecration assumed the existence of underworld gods who could accept the devotee's life in place of the leader's. A war-retinue (Gefolgschaft) of picked warriors served closely under the great chiefs. The personal name Ambatus is very common in Celtiberian inscriptions, and some scholars connect it with the Gaulish ambacti and read its frequency as a trace of the same institution, though the link is disputed.

The size such followings could reach appears in the literary record. The Celtiberian prince Allucius is said to have thanked Scipio by presenting him with 1,400 horsemen drawn from his own clients. Salinas cites the story of the chieftain Thurro, who in 179 BC put himself at the disposal of Tiberius Sempronius Gracchus after Gracchus had spared his captured sons, as showing that clientship was practised among the Celtiberians before the Roman conquest. Rome then set out to draw these mounted elites into its own following, so that in time they were absorbed into the Roman clientship system. Certain dependent settlements have been read as 'client settlements' typical of Celtiberian society.

== Medieval Celtic ==
=== Ireland ===
The early Irish law tracts describe clientship in legal detail and distinguish two kinds of client, the base client and the free client. Thomas Charles-Edwards describes the institution as one form of the lord-and-vassal relationship common to medieval Western Europe: it was made by a grant of livestock, or sometimes of land, in return for food-renders and personal service from the client. What most set it apart from the manorial lordship of medieval France and England was that the grant was normally of cattle rather than of land. Fergus Kelly notes that holding clients gave a lord standing as well as food-rent and services, while in return the client received from his lord an advance of stock or land with which to support himself and his dependants, and could look to his lord for backing at law.

Nerys Patterson places clientship at the centre of the political economy of the túath (the small kingdom), the instrument through which lords built and held power. A single pattern of gift and return ran through the whole hierarchy, from the túarastal, a stipend of costly gifts bestowed by an over-king and repaid in tribute by an under-king, down to the fief of cattle advanced to a base client, each grant binding the receiver to a fixed return.

In base clientship the lord advanced to his client a fief, usually of livestock, called the taurchrecc ('fore-purchase'). Its size varied with the client's rank, an ócaire ('small farmer') receiving a fief worth 16 séts (a sét being a standard unit of value, reckoned in cattle or silver) and a bóaire ('strong farmer') one worth 30. The client paid a yearly food-rent (bés tige) in proportion to the fief, and if he paid it in full for at least seven years the fief became his own on the lord's death. The lord also secured the base client's honour-price (lóg n-enech, 'the value of a face', the measure of a free person's standing at law) by advancing him goods called the séoit turchluide ('chattels of subjection'). The fief advanced to a free client was called instead the ráth.

A lord's own honour-price was reckoned in part from his clients, so that an aire déso, the lowest grade of lord, took his honour-price of ten séts from his holding of five base clients. The relationship reached into the church as well, for an abbot, like any secular lord, could advance a fief to monastic clients who answered with rent and service.

=== Wales ===
Within the insular Celtic world the institution appears to be peculiar to Ireland. Charles-Edwards finds no system in Wales to match Irish base clientship. There free native descent conferred nobility of itself, a lord's position rested on food-renders rather than on a grant of cattle, and the render-paying taeog was, unlike the Irish base client, unfree. He rejects the argument of D. Howells that the Welsh law-texts keep traces of clientship on the Irish pattern, while allowing that it may none the less be correct.

== Interpretation ==
Since the same shape of nobility and dependants recurs across Gaul, Celtiberia and Ireland, this has led scholars to treat clientship as a common feature of Celtic society. Kruta and Rankin note that the two Gaulish grades, the ambacti and the clientes, answer in their situation to the forms of dependence known from early Ireland. Kruta adds that in both regions the bond rested on a grant of cattle rather than of land.

The comparison is qualified, however, by chronology and by the nature of the sources. The continental evidence describes societies of the 2nd and 1st centuries BC seen by outsiders, whereas the Irish evidence is early-medieval law. Nash cautions that Caesar and Posidonios were themselves describing different Celts at different stages, so that agreements between the accounts may reflect lasting social traits while differences may reflect real change over time. The Roman vocabulary is a further difficulty. Alain Daubigney argues that when the sources speak of servi and of a familia they are naming native forms of dependence rather than chattel slavery, so that servitus in Caesar means bondage for debt and not enslavement. On this view the 'slave' of Gaul and Germania is largely a product of the Roman way of seeing native society.

The warrior-consecration bound up with clientship, the Gaulish soldurii and the Iberian devotio, rested in both regions on religious belief. Karl Peschel connects the Gaulish devotee's readiness to die with the druidic teaching that the soul lives on after death, reported by Strabo and Lucan. The Iberian devotio assumed underworld gods who could receive the devotee in the leader's place. Some scholars have set Celtic clientship, and this warrior-consecration with it, within a wider Indo-European pattern of personal dependency and warrior bands. Andreas Hofeneder argues that this consecration was the mark of no single people but a shared institution, attested for Gauls, Aquitani, Celtiberians, Iberians and Germani alike, so that the older label devotio iberica has to be set aside.
