= Wicker man =

Reported ancient Celtic method of human sacrifice by fire

The wicker man is the name given to a large figure of wickerwork and wood in which, according to some Graeco-Roman writers, the Gauls burned human and animal sacrifices. The two main accounts are Julius Caesar's de Bello Gallico (50s BC) and Strabo's Geographica (early 1st c. AD), both probably deriving from the lost ethnography of the Greek philosopher Posidonius (ca. 135–51 BC). Caesar describes huge wickerwork images filled with living men and set on fire, while Strabo describes a colossus of straw and wood into which humans and animals were placed before being burned. The English term wicker man is modern, and the classical sources do not give the construction a distinct name. Two further notices, in Diodorus Siculus (1st c. BC) and in the 9th-century AD Commenta Bernensia, describe the burning of victims, but not a wickerwork anthropomorphic figure.

The reliability of these accounts remains disputed. Modern scholars debate whether the figure was necessarily human-shaped, what purpose the rite served, and whether the reports preserve a real Gaulish practice or reflect Graeco-Roman stereotypes about barbarian human sacrifice. Some academics regard the reports as having a core of authenticity, especially because human sacrifice in Gaul is mentioned by several ancient writers and is partly supported by archaeological evidence interpreted as ritual killing. Others stress that no archaeological find securely attests the burning of victims inside wicker figures, that Caesar and Strabo may depend on the same written source rather than first-hand observations, and that the rite is not shown to have been widespread or frequent.

The modern image of the wicker man has been shaped mainly by later reception. Aylett Sammes's Britannia Antiqua Illustrata (1676) gave the brief classical notices a lasting visual form as a huge male wicker figure filled with human victims. James George Frazer later linked the rite to European fire customs in his influential work The Golden Bough (1913). Robin Hardy's 1973 horror film The Wicker Man made the burning human-shaped figure one of the most familiar modern images of pagan sacrifice. Since the film, wicker-man burnings have appeared in many modern festivals and re-enactments.

== Name ==
The English term wicker man is a modern invention. The classical sources do not give the construction a distinct name: Caesar writes of simulacra ('images') of immense size, while Strabo uses the Greek kolossos (κολοσσὸν). They denote a large image, statue or effigy. Jean-Louis Brunaux notes that these terms are often used for divine representations, but whether it was actually man-shaped cannot be established from ancient accounts.

Its familiar name and design were shaped centuries later by modern writers. In particular, Aylett Sammes called the structure a "Wicker Image" in Britannia Antiqua Illustrata (1676), and his engraving helped fix its lasting image as a huge male wicker figure filled with human bodies and set above a fire.

== Classical accounts ==
The construction is reported in a group of Greek and Latin texts on Gaulish religion, all written in the 1st century BC or later, and probably drawing on the lost ethnography of the Greek philosopher Posidonius (ca. 135–51 BC).

=== Caesar and Strabo ===
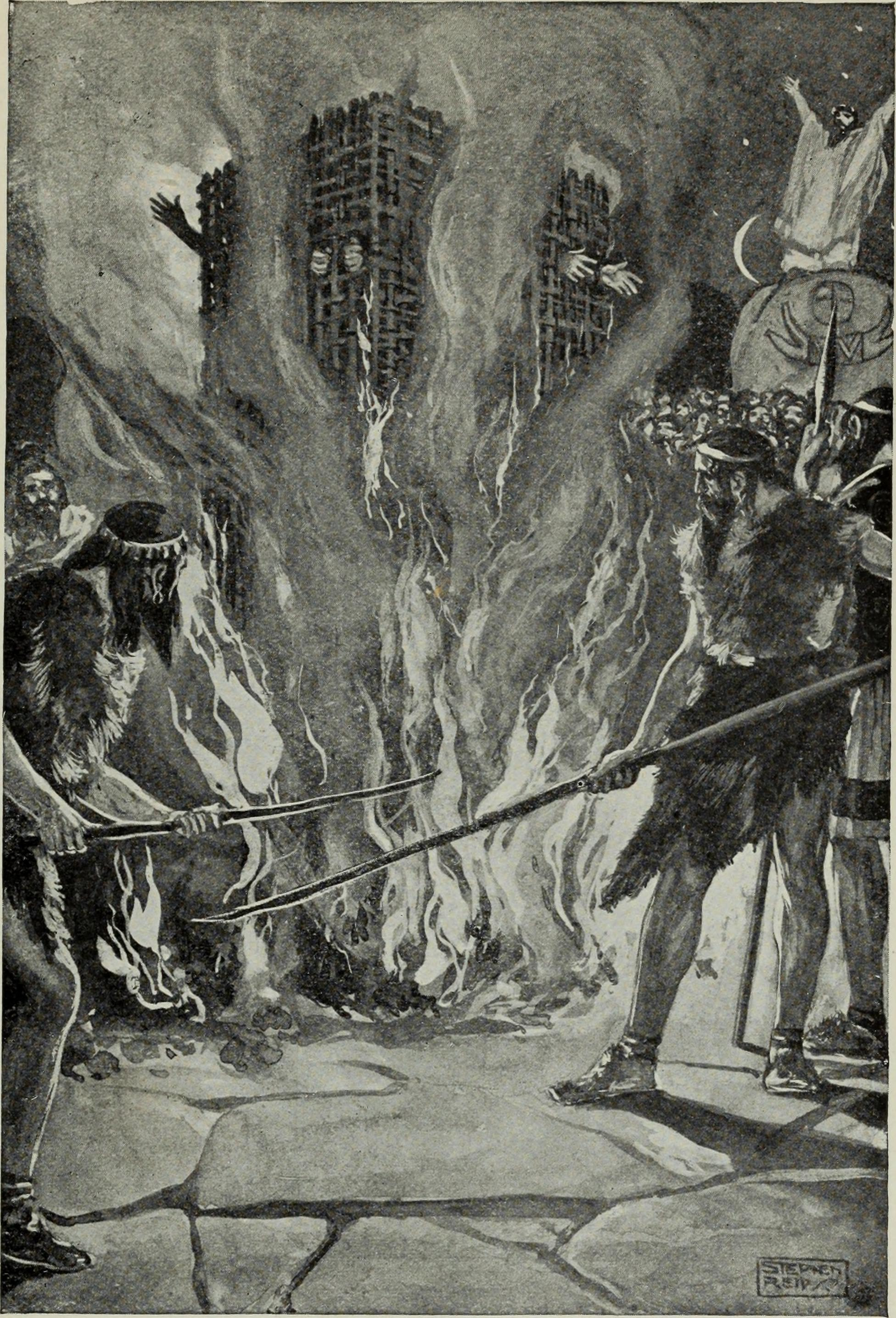
Illustration of human sacrifices in Gaul from Myths and Legends of the Celtic Race (1910) by T. W. Rolleston

Julius Caesar describes the practice in his account of the Gauls in the sixth book of the Gallic War, a digression written after prolonged campaigning in Gaul. He reports that people suffering from serious illness, or facing danger in war, offer human victims or vow to do so, and that they employ Druids to conduct the sacrifice, since they hold that the life of one person must be repaid by the life of another. Caesar adds that the Gauls consider the sacrifice of thieves and other criminals more pleasing to the gods, but that they turn to the innocent when such offenders run short.

The Gauls believe the power of the immortal gods can be appeased only if one human life is exchanged for another, and they have sacrifices of this kind regularly established by the community. Some of them have enormous images made of wickerwork the limbs of which they fill with living men; these are set on fire and the men perish, enveloped in the flames.

— Caesar, De Bello Gallico, VI, 16

Strabo, writing under Augustus, gives a closely related account in the fourth book of his Geography. He was a follower of Stoic philosophy, was contemptuous of what he regarded as barbarian superstition, and never travelled to Gaul, so for the region he drew on Posidonius. Listing the Gaulish sacrificial and divinatory customs that the Romans suppressed, he mentions killing a victim by a sword-blow in the back and divining from the death-throes, and shooting men down with arrows or impaling them in the sanctuaries. Strabo writes in the past tense and implies that the rite had ceased by his own day. Unlike Caesar, he includes animals among the victims.

We are told of still other kinds of sacrifices ... having built a colossus of straw and wood, they throw into the colossus cattle and animals of all sorts and human beings, and then make a burnt offering of the whole thing.

— Strabo, Geographia, IV, 4, 5

=== Related accounts ===
Two further texts are often cited alongside Caesar and Strabo, although neither describes an anthropomorphic figure.

Diodorus Siculus, drawing on the same Posidonian material, reports that the Gauls keep condemned criminals for five years and then impale them in honour of the gods and burn them, with many other offerings, on very large pyres. Whether Diodorus is describing the same rite as the wicker figure is disputed. Some scholars have equated the two, but Andreas Hofeneder regards the identification as far from certain, since Diodorus mentions only pyres and no image.

The Commenta Bernensia, a set of glosses on Lucan's Pharsalia preserved in a 9th-century manuscript, gives a related but different notice. In its comment on Taranis, one of the three Gaulish gods named by Lucan, the gloss identifies him with Dis Pater and says that he was appeased by the burning of men in a wooden vessel. Miranda Aldhouse-Green notes that this vessel is described as a tub or trough, not a wickerwork figure.

== Scholarly assessments ==
=== Ancient sources ===
The wording of Caesar and Strabo is almost identical, which points to a shared written source rather than independent observation. That source is generally taken to be the lost ethnographic work of Posidonius, who travelled in southern Gaul in the early 1st century BC and whom Diodorus and Strabo both used. Most scholars hold that Caesar also did not witness the rite himself but took it from this tradition. Bernhard Maier is more cautious, noting that it remains uncertain whether Caesar drew on his own observation or on older sources, even if his reference to the sacrifice of criminals, which parallels Diodorus, points to Posidonius for at least part of his account.

Modern commentators note that the accounts served their authors' purposes. Strabo's Stoic disdain for traditional religion, and the wider Graeco-Roman habit of contrasting a civilised centre with a barbarous periphery, gave writers a motive to dwell on Gaulish human sacrifice. Jean-Louis Brunaux treats the remarks of Cicero and Caesar on the subject as partly rhetorical set-pieces of the kind expected of Roman political orators. Maier observes that the theme was already a propaganda commonplace at Rome before Caesar's campaigns, exploited by Cicero in his defence of Marcus Fonteius in 69 BC. Even so, Aldhouse-Green argues that the reports have a core of authenticity. Lucan's three gods are all attested on inscriptions, and the various modes of sacrificial killing that the writers describe are matched by finds from Iron Age and Roman north-western Europe.

Ancient accounts also differ among themselves. Nora Chadwick held that Strabo's wording is ambiguous and may describe victims burned after death, whereas Caesar's account has them burned alive. Caesar further presents human sacrifice as a regular practice in mid-1st-century-BC Gaul, which is hard to reconcile with Diodorus, who implies that it took place only on special occasions and for divination.

=== Form and purpose of the figure ===
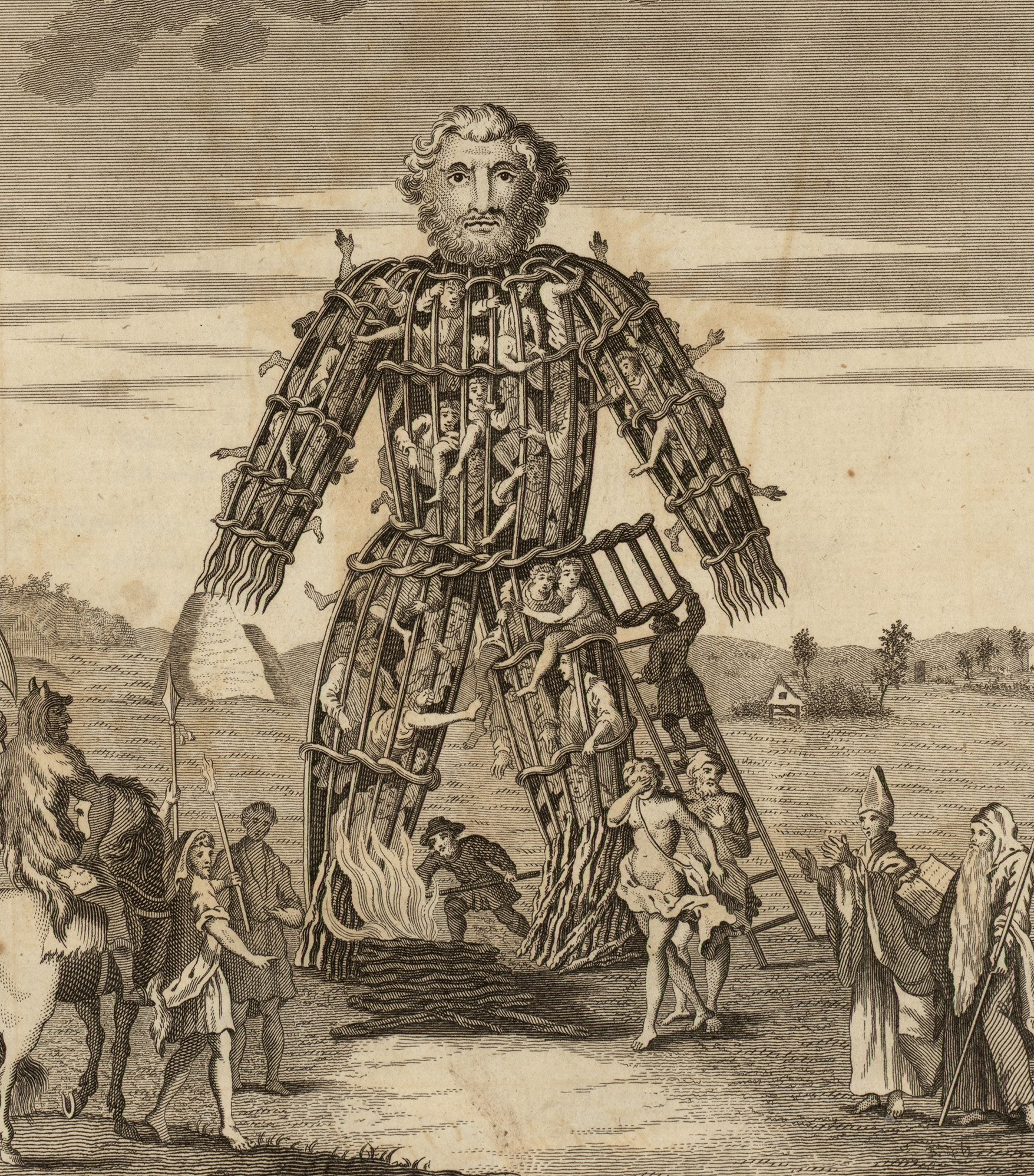
An 18th-century illustration from a 1753 edition of Caesar's Commentaries influenced by Sammes's Britannia Antiqua Illustrata (1676).

The shape of the figure is uncertain. Caesar's simulacrum and Strabo's kolossos are both words for images of gods, so the construction may have represented a deity, and Brunaux suggests it could have taken the form of a god. Whether it was actually man-shaped cannot be established from the texts. Miranda Aldhouse-Green, by contrast, treats the human form as significant. She reads the burning image as a person 'writ large' and, following the archaeologist Christopher Tilley, as a metaphor for society itself.

The purpose of the burning is equally obscure, and proposals such as an offering to a sun-god remain speculative. Aldhouse-Green suggests that, because flames and smoke rise skyward, such offerings may have been directed at celestial deities, and she links this to the Bern gloss connecting the burning of men to the thunder-god Taranis. The wicker figure is in any case only one of several methods of ritual killing reported for Gaul, alongside stabbing, shooting, impaling, drowning and hanging. Aldhouse-Green sets these within a scheme of three symbolic deaths matched to Lucan's three gods: fire with Taranis, water with Teutates and hanging with Esus. She observes that some bog bodies appear to have been killed in more than one way. Even so, this scheme is a modern reconstruction, and the association of Taranis with burning rests only on a gloss in the early medieval Commenta Bernensia, where the apparatus is a wooden vessel rather than a wicker figure. Bernhard Maier cautions that the scholia's assignment of particular deaths to particular gods, like their identification of Lucan's gods with those named by Caesar, may be the speculation of a late-antique scholar.

=== Reliability ===
Scholarly assessments on the reliability of ancient accounts also differ. Brunaux holds that the circumstantial detail lends the report some credibility, but argues that the information reaching Posidonius was likely incomplete. No reason for the sacrifice is given, and his informant had probably not seen the ceremony at first hand. Nothing in the sources shows that the rite was widespread or frequent. Brunaux treats Strabo's report of wild animals as highly doubtful, and reads Caesar's mention of human victims alone as a way of stressing the barbarity of Gaulish religion. In a wider survey, Brunaux concludes that human sacrifice did take place in Gaul, regularly until the 3rd century BC and in a warrior context, before it became largely a form of judicial execution. Hofeneder likewise concludes that sacrifices probably took place, but that who performed them, how often, at what season and for what purpose all remain unknown.

Miranda Aldhouse-Green writes that no archaeological find securely attests the burning of victims in wicker figures. She points instead to a pit at Leonding in Austria, dated to around 200 BC, which held the burnt remains of twelve people and animals and has been read as the site of a repeated fire-sacrifice. She compares the rite to other ritual burnings, such as the firing of the great timber monument at Navan Fort in Ireland and the burnt sacrifice of a wooden image described by Pausanias at Plataea. Human sacrifice among the Gauls is reported by several classical writers, but its archaeological demonstration is difficult to establish. Bernhard Maier notes that the skeletal remains from the La Tène sanctuaries of northern Gaul point to the ritual handling of corpses rather than to sacrifice, and that the clearest evidence comes instead from bog bodies such as Lindow Man.

An even more sceptical view questions whether the rite described by Caesar and Strabo was ever performed at all. Richard Sermon, observing that these reports refer only to Gaul, argues that those accounts may reflect Roman propaganda and are not corroborated by evidence independent of a few ancient writers. He even suggests that the first wicker man actually built and burned may have been the one made for the The Wicker Man film at Burrowhead in 1972.

== Reception ==
The reception of the wicker man was shaped above all by three reinterpretations of the classical texts. Aylett Sammes gave the brief notices in Caesar and Strabo their enduring visual form in 1676, James Frazer linked the rite to later European fire customs in The Golden Bough in 1913, and Robin Hardy's 1973 film The Wicker Man turned the motif into one of the most familiar modern images of pagan sacrifice. For Richard Sermon, modern views of the wicker man owe more to this chain of reinterpretations than to the ancient evidence itself.

=== Antiquarian imagery ===
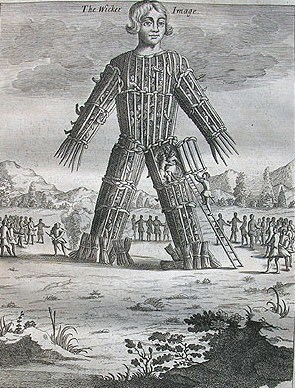
Representation of a wicker man from Sammes's Britannia Antiqua Illustrata (1676).

By the later 17th century English writers increasingly esteemed the Druids, and quoted Caesar and Strabo to cast them as the founders of British learning. The visual tradition of the wicker man was largely shaped by Aylett Sammes's Britannia Antiqua Illustrata (1676). Sammes, an antiquary who sought to derive British culture from the Phoenicians, described a 'Wicker Image' in which, he claimed, the ancient Britons as well as the Gauls burned human victims.

Sammes's engraving converted the brief classical notices into a concrete image: a huge male figure of woven wicker, filled with struggling human bodies, with fire being prepared beneath it. Ronald Hutton calls it a highly imaginative reconstruction of the figures mentioned by Caesar and Strabo. This single image soon became iconic, fixing the visual form of the rite for later readers as if it were an accurate historical record. It was reproduced in editions of Caesar's Gallic War from the 18th century onward, and influenced perceptions of ancient British paganism down to late 20th-century cinema.

The motif also recurs in Romantic verse, notably in William Wordsworth's evocations of victims burning in a "gigantic wicker" on Salisbury Plain in the late 18th century.

=== Folklore comparisons ===
The classical accounts have often been compared to later European folk customs in which effigies or animals were burned at seasonal festivals. In The Golden Bough (1913), James Frazer linked the Gaulish rite to two such customs, the parading of large wickerwork giants and the burning of animals at fire festivals. He treated both as survivals of the ancient sacrifices, noting that they clustered in and around the former province of Gaul. Richard Sermon points out that Frazer offered no conclusive evidence connecting two customs so distant in time.

Hilda Ellis Davidson later compared the accounts to midsummer fire ceremonies recorded in the French Pyrenees and the Basque country in the late 19th century, at which a tall wickerwork frame, in one instance about six metres high and shaped "like a mummy or perhaps a cigar set on end", was filled with live animals and burned, and she cited Frazer's examples of cats burned in wicker cages at midsummer bonfires. Davidson was nonetheless doubtful about the tall upright figure imagined by 17th-century antiquaries, which she thought would have been hard to build and to keep standing as it burned, and she rejected an earlier suggestion that Caesar had known a particular hill figure such as the Long Man of Wilmington, since no trace of burning has been found there. Aldhouse-Green also records a related German Easter custom of burning straw figures called 'Judas Men'.

A different comparative approach, current in the 20th century, drew on Celtic comparative mythology, reading the Gaulish rite alongside insular, mostly Irish, tradition. T. G. E. Powell compared the wickerwork figures to Irish stories of houses burned down with people, sometimes kings, inside. Jan de Vries connected the rite more specifically to the ritual killing of the sacral king, who in several tales is shut in a burning house or drowned in a vessel, often at Samhain. Anne Ross traced the dread attached to the bruiden, the otherworld hostel destroyed by fire in several Irish tales, to the burning of human sacrifices in wickerwork images. Françoise Le Roux and Christian-Joseph Guyonvarc'h set the accounts beside Irish tales of ritual fire, such as the pyre kindled by the druid Mog Ruith, and read the burning of victims as one expression of a wider druidic mastery of fire, accepting the attribution of the fire-sacrifice to Taranis in the Commenta Bernensia.

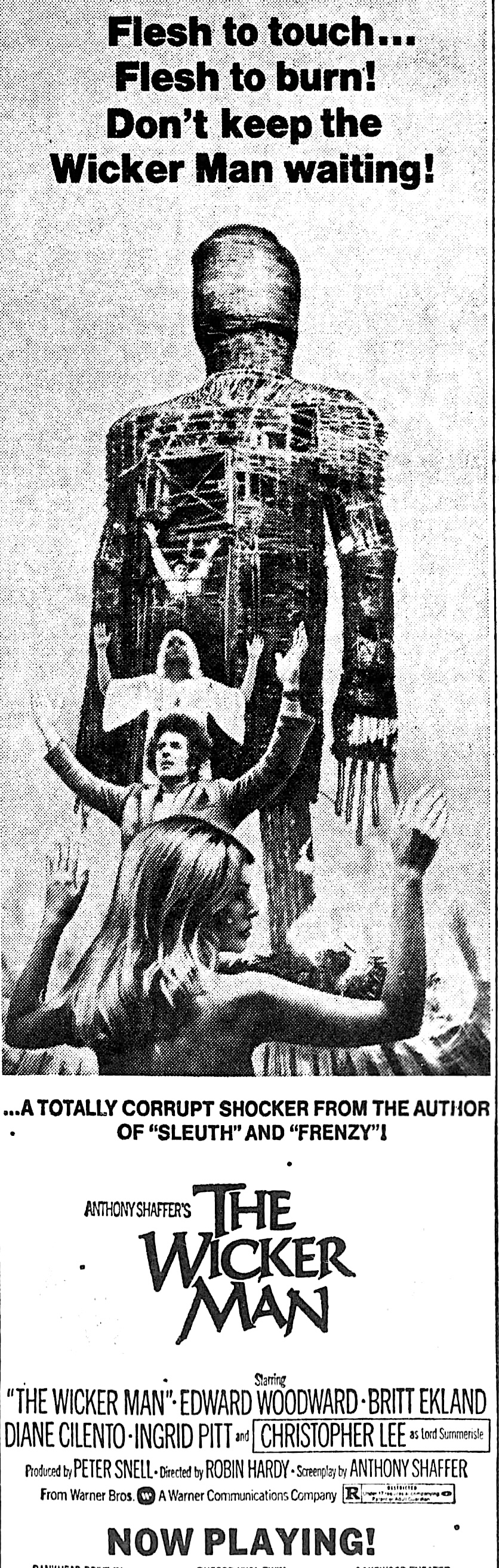
Advertisement for the movie The Wicker Man (1974)

The idea that much later customs are survivals of the ancient rite has been questioned on several grounds by recent research. Ronald Hutton notes that the folklorists' doctrine of survivals, which underlay Frazer's method, was discredited in the early 20th century, as archaeology displaced folklore as the discipline of prehistory. Richard Sermon adds that most British folk customs are now thought unlikely to have pre-Christian origins, and that the 'Celtic Calendar' commonly used to align May Day with Beltane is a modern scholarly construction rather than an ancient survival. Andreas Hofeneder likewise holds that the medieval and modern ceremonies, bound up with ideas like the burning of witches, contribute little to understanding the ancient Gaulish rite.

=== Modern culture ===
The motif was also central to Robin Hardy's cult film The Wicker Man, released in 1973. The film has played a major role in the modern reception of the wicker man. Its final scene has made the burning human-shaped figure one of the most familiar modern representations of pagan sacrifice, with its imagery strongly influencing both popular and academic representations of the pagan past. Ronald Hutton treats it as drawing together three elements: ancient accounts of Celtic sacrifice in a large woven figure, Frazer's reworking of such material in The Golden Bough, and the existing genre of stories about hidden or revived pagan communities.

Richard Sermon observes that there has been a proliferation of wicker-man burnings in Britain and North America since the film's release, even though there is no evidence for such a rite in ancient Britain. The image was taken up in modern fire festivals and re-enactments at reconstructed Iron Age sites, such as at the Peat Moors Centre near Glastonbury, Gillingham in Kent, Castell Henllys in Pembrokeshire, and the Beltane celebrations at Butser Ancient Farm. It also spread to events such as the Burning Man festival in Nevada, the Beltane Fire Festival in Edinburgh and the Wickerman Festival in Scotland, and to popular culture, including Iron Maiden's 2000 single "The Wicker Man" and the computer game Warrior Kings. Mikel Koven reads this spread as a form of ostension, in which the invented rite of a film is carried out as real practice, and holds that the film itself rests on a 'folklore fallacy' that takes Frazer's comparative folklore for history.

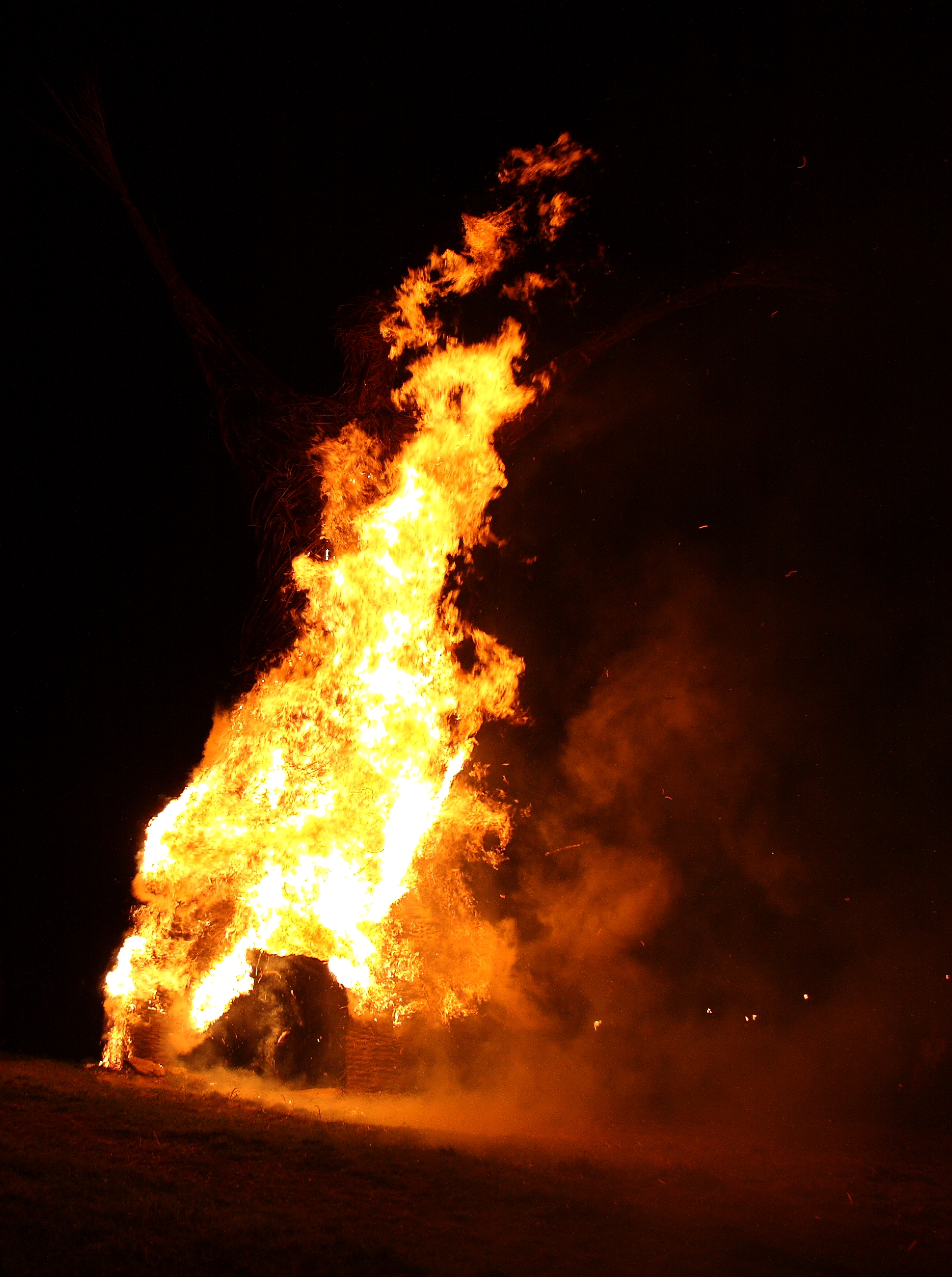
Wicker man on fire at the Archaeolink Prehistory Park, Oyne, Aberdeenshire, Scotland

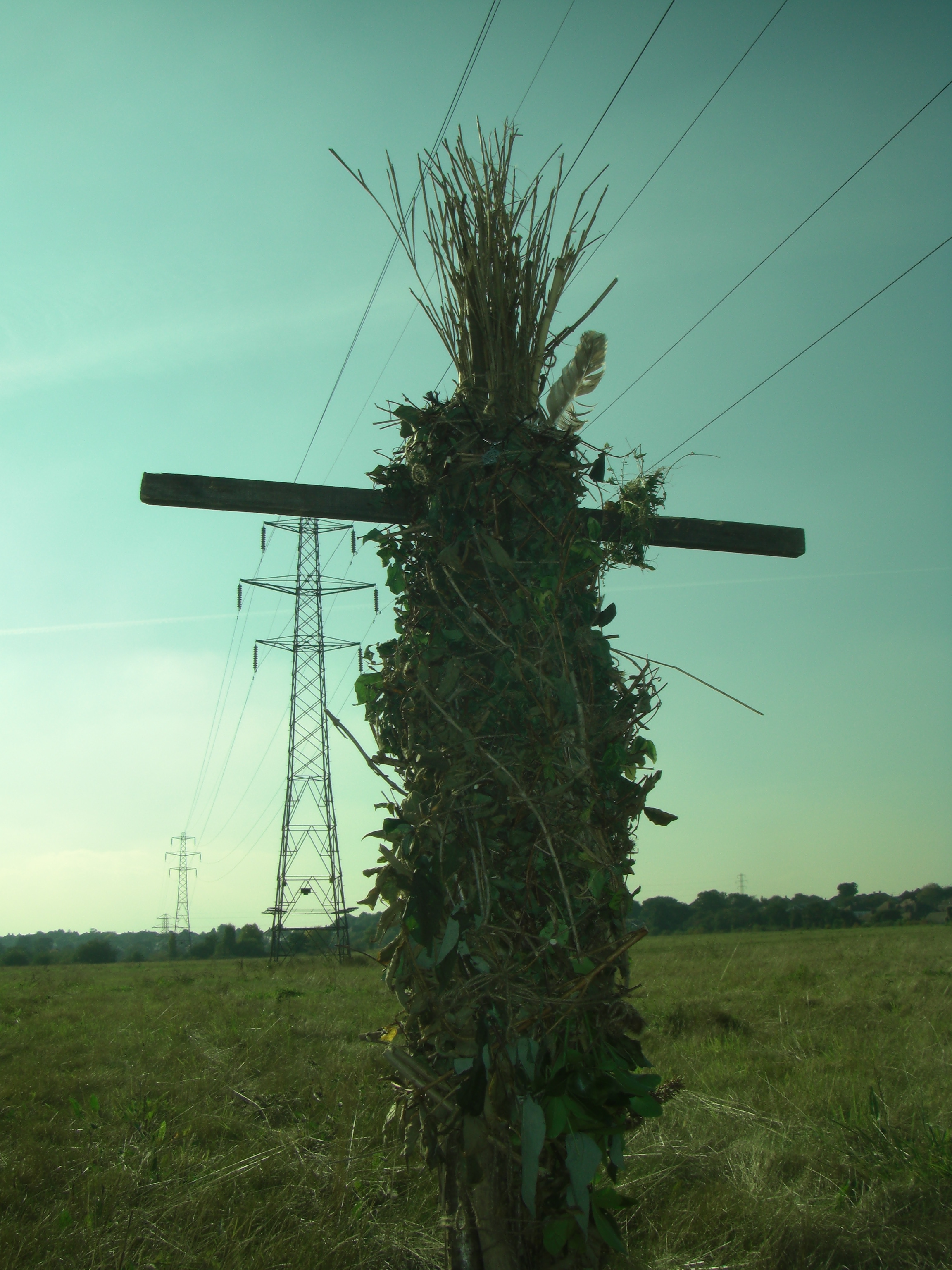
A lifesize modern pagan wicker man, in south east London, England

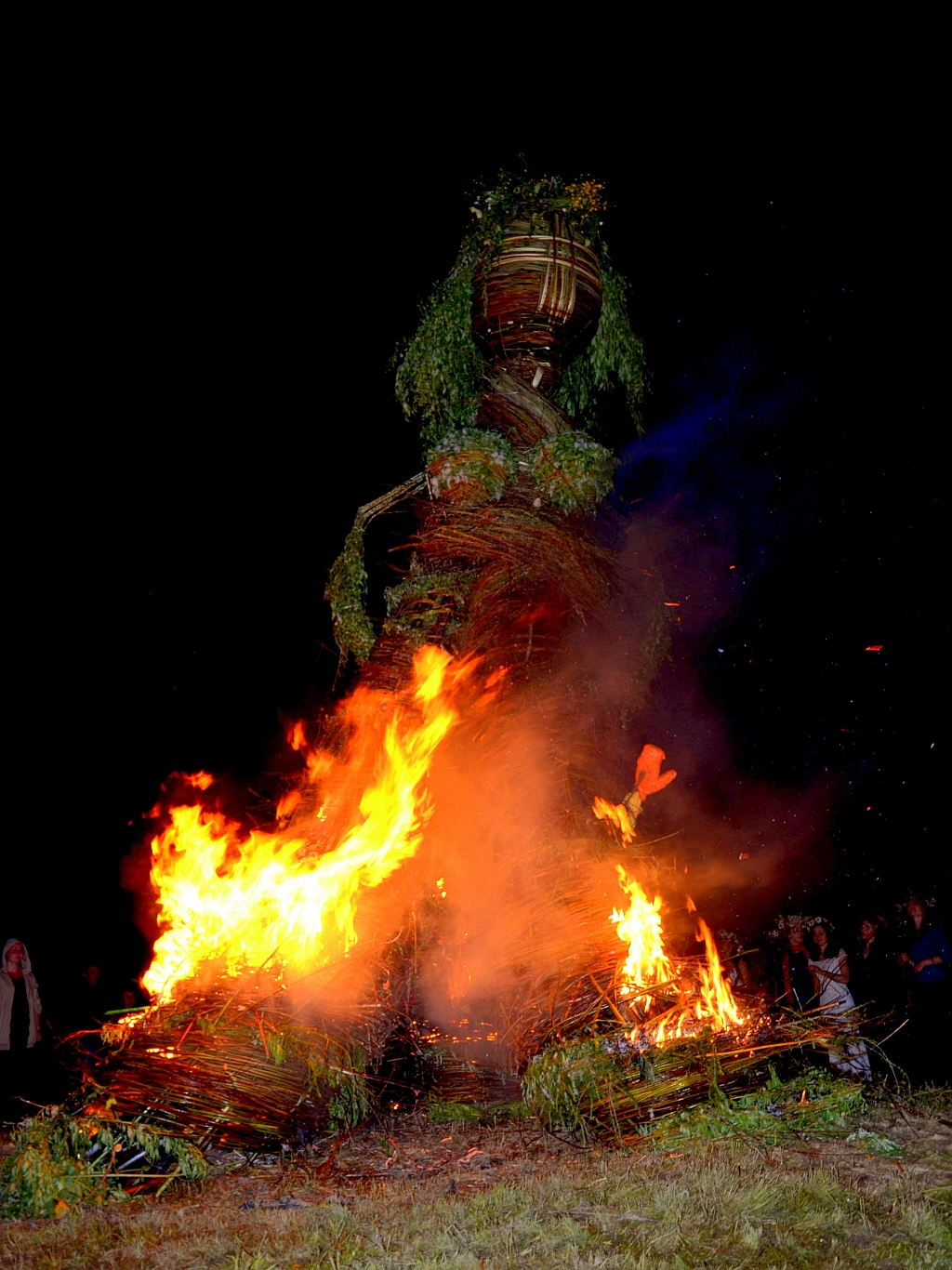
Wickerman Event 2013 in Wola Sękowa, Poland

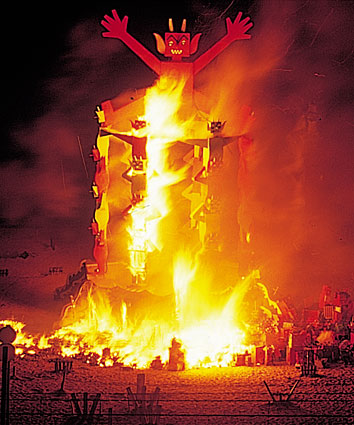
'Cremada del Dimoni' in Badalona (Catalonia).
