= Coriosolites =

Gallic tribe

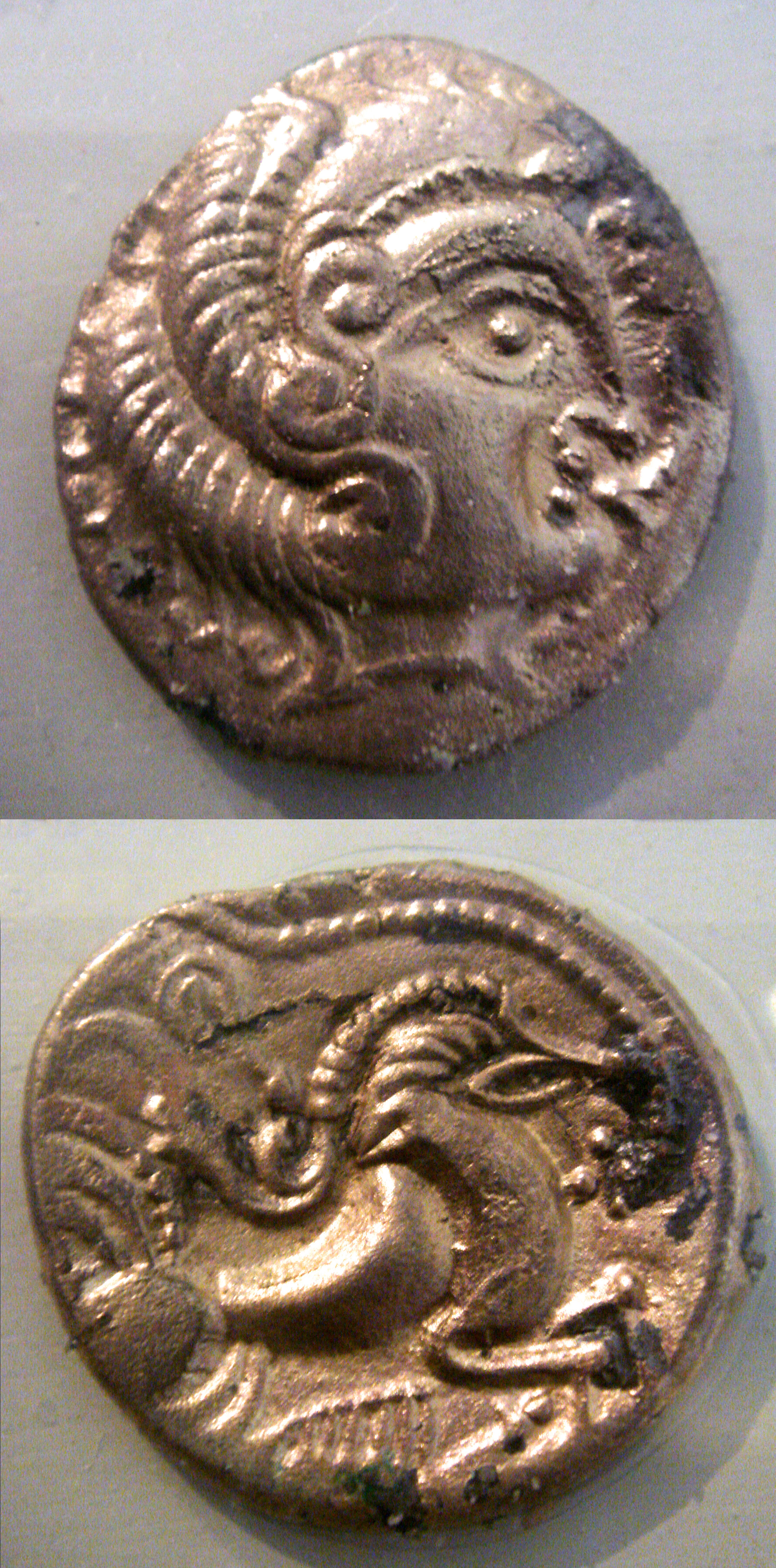
Coins of the Curiosolitae, 5th-1st century BC.

The Coriosolites or Curiosolitae were a Gallic people dwelling on the northern coast of present-day Brittany during the Iron Age and the Roman period.

== Name ==
They are mentioned as Coriosolitas (var. coriosolitos, curiosolitas, curiosolitas) and Coriosolites (var. coriosultes, coricoriosuelites, cariosu-) by Caesar (mid-1st c. BCE), and as Coriosvelites by Pliny (1st c. CE).

The etymology of the ethnonym Coriosolites remains uncertain. The first element is certainly the Gaulish root corio- ('army, troop'), derived from Proto-Indo-European *kóryos ('army, people under arms'). However, the meaning of the second element is unclear. Pierre-Yves Lambert has proposed to interpret corio-solit-es as 'those who purchase (or sell) mercenaries', by positing a Gaulish stem solitu- ('purchase/salary of mercenaries'; cf. Gaul. soldurios < *soliturio- 'body-guard, loyal, devoted', OBret. solt 'sol'). Alternatively, a connection with the Gaulish stem sūli- ('[good] sight'; cf. OIr. súil, 'sight', Britt. Sulis) has also been conjectured, with corio-soli-tes as the 'troop-watchers', 'those who watch over the troop'.

The town of Corseul, attested ca. 400 AD as civitas Coriosolitum ('civitas of the Curiosolites', Aecclesia Corsult ca. 869, Corsout in 1288) is named after the Gallic tribe.

== Geography ==
=== Territory ===
The Coriosolites are mentioned by Caesar together with the Veneti, Unelli, Osismi, and others that Caesar calls maritimae civitates, "maritime cities", which border on the Atlantic Ocean. Elsewhere he describes the position of the Coriosolites on the ocean in the same terms, and includes them among the Armoric states, a name equivalent to maritimae. Pliny mentions them with the Unelli, Diablindi, and Rhedones.

=== Settlements ===
The ancient settlement of Corseul was most likely established ex nihilo by the Roman authorities during the reign of Augustus, as the capital of the civitas Coriosolitum. The town is generally identified with the settlement of Fanum Martis ('temple of Mars') mentioned on the Tabula Peutingeriana (5th c. AD). Due to the lack of early epigraphic record, however, the original Gaulish name of the town remains unknown. Corseul reached a size of 47 ha in the first centuries of the Common Era.

Around 340 AD, the capital of the civitas was moved to Aleth (Saint-Servan), situated on the coast.

== Notes ==
=== Bibliography ===
- Delamarre, Xavier (2003). Dictionnaire de la langue gauloise: Une approche linguistique du vieux-celtique continental. Errance. ISBN 9782877723695.
- Falileyev, Alexander (2010). Dictionary of Continental Celtic Place-names: A Celtic Companion to the Barrington Atlas of the Greek and Roman World. CMCS. ISBN 978-0955718236.
- Kerébel, Hervé (2004). "Corseul / Fanum Martis (Côtes-d' Armor)". Supplément à la Revue archéologique du centre de la France. 25 (1): 411–415.
- Lambert, Pierre-Yves (2008). "Gaulois Solitumaros". Études celtiques. 36 (1): 89–101. doi:10.3406/ecelt.2008.2303.
- Nègre, Ernest (1990). Toponymie générale de la France. Librairie Droz. ISBN 978-2-600-02883-7.
