= Ambactus =

Latin term for a dependent in Gaulish society

In ancient times, an ambactus (Gaulish: ambactos or ambaxtos) was a dependent in the service of a Gallic nobleman. It is known from the early Roman poet Ennius (2nd century BC), whose use of it is reported by the grammarian Festus, and from Julius Caesar (1st century BC), who counts the ambacti among the followers a Gaulish noble gathered around himself in proportion to his rank. The word goes back to a Proto-Celtic compound meaning 'one who is driven around'. It was taken into Germanic, where it produced Old High German ambaht ('servant') and modern German Amt ('office'). By a more roundabout transmission it also lies behind the Romance words that gave English ambassador.

== Name ==
The word is credited in Latin to the early Roman poet Ennius (2nd century BC) by the grammarian Festus (2nd century AD), who records it as the Gaulish term for a servus ('slave, servant') and explains it as circumactus ('one driven around'). Caesar uses the plural ambacti in his account of Gallic society, the fullest description of the term to survive from antiquity. The same element occurs in Gaulish personal names and on coin legends reading Ambactos and Ambacti, where its sense is uncertain.

The Gaulish form was ambactos or ambaxtos, from Proto-Celtic *ambaxtos. It is a compound of *ambi- ('around') and a verbal adjective of *ag- ('to drive, to lead'), with the literal sense 'one who is driven around' or 'one who goes about'. The Proto-Indo-European starting point is reconstructed as *h₂mbʰi-h₂eǵ- ('drive around'). The Insular Celtic languages keep related words in the world of farming: Welsh amaeth ('ploughman'), Old Breton ambaith, and the Welsh divine ploughman Amaethon, from *Ambactonos. A Hispano-Celtic personal name Ambatos has also been compared with the Gaulish word. Its frequency in the Celtiberian onomasticon has been read as evidence of a class of retainers serving closely under great chieftains, whom Alain Daubigney connected with the Gaulish ambacti, although the connection has been contested.

Whether the word first meant 'servant' or 'envoy' has been debated. Rudolf Thurneysen and Karl Horst Schmidt took the original sense to be 'one sent out, a messenger'. Enrico Campanile treated this as a later reinterpretation under the influence of Latin actus, since the root *ag- is intransitive in Celtic, and kept to the sense 'one who moves about in attendance'. The image of a servant as one who moves about his master recurs elsewhere in Indo-European, as in Latin anculus, Greek amphipolos, and Sanskrit abhicara, all formed on the root *kʷel- ('to turn, to revolve').

The word was taken into Proto-Germanic, giving Old High German ambaht ('servant') and modern German Amt ('office'), and it passed on into Finnish ammatti ('occupation') through ancient Germanic speakers. By a more involved route, (Note: The path was indirect. With the suffix -ia, the classical Latin ambactus first gave the post-classical Latin noun ambascia ('mission, errand'), found from the 6th century in the Salic and Burgundian laws. From it came the verb ambasciare ('to convey an order or message') in the 8th century, whose feminine past participle was used as a noun, ambasciata ('diplomatic mission, embassy'), current from the 13th century and above all in Italian. It passed through Old Occitan ambayssada and Italian ambasciata to the Anglo-Norman and Middle French ambassade that gave the English word.) it also stands behind French ambassade, and so behind English ambassador and embassy.

== Interpretation ==
In Caesar's account the ambacti appear beside the clientes as the followers of the Gaulish noble warriors, and the number a man could gather marked his standing and power.

Venceslas Kruta describes the ambactus as a man who was free, and so under arms, but who bound himself to a powerful figure and followed him to war. On this reading, Gaulish society set apart two grades of dependence with close parallels in early Irish law. The ambacti stood near serfdom, yet were not, as Caesar took them to be, the property of their lords. They handed over their legal personality, for payment or for debt, to a rich patron who then stood for them in law, while keeping the right to bear arms that marked a free man. The clientes were bound less tightly, since they kept their own standing in law, but they paid heavier dues and owed homage together with service in war and peace. The number of ambacti and clientes attached to an aristocrat fixed his weight in law, expressed in the honor price of Celtic custom. According to Kruta, the tie rested on grants of livestock rather than of land. David Rankin sets the ambacti alongside the sóerchéli ('free clients') of early Ireland as instances of warriors who were free men yet stood in client status to their chiefs.

Jean-Louis Brunaux reads the social role in the light of the word's meaning: the ambactus was the man who moved about the warrior he served, at once his guard, his servant and his companion. He takes the tie to have been personal rather than strictly hierarchical, as much a matter of kinship as of friendship, and describes the ambacti as men who pledged themselves almost as an act of religion to a leader, and through him to the war-band as a whole.

Because the word was glossed servus, it is not always clear which of the dependent groups named in the ancient sources were in fact ambacti. Andreas Hofeneder observes that the attendants (therapontes) whom Posidonius describes, as reported by Diodorus, are expressly called freeborn, and so are probably not the same people. (Note: At the funeral of a man of rank, Caesar reports, the slaves and dependents dear to him were burned with the body. Alfred Holder connected these servi with the ambacti, but Gerhard Dobesch judged it more likely that they were true slaves, which better fits Caesar's usage: such servi would render the lord his ordinary service in the next world as slaves did in this one, whereas armed following came from the clientes, though ambacti may have been meant alongside the slaves.) (Note: Heinrich Meusel identified the clientes led by the Aeduan Litaviccus in 52 BC with ambacti, but the equation is doubtful, since these men took part in political deliberations.) The same Posidonian material, as reported by Diodorus, has the Celtic warriors take freeborn but less affluent men to war as servants, charioteers and shield-bearers. Alain Daubigney argues that the Latin words for slavery that the ancient writers applied to Celtic society described native forms of dependence viewed through Roman eyes, rather than chattel slavery, so that the servi they mention need not be taken as a class of true slaves, but referred to ambacti using an imprecise Roman terminology. (Note: The ancient glossators equated ambacti with servi, coloni and lixae, which for Daubigney shows that ambactus and servus were not opposites but two renderings of the same relation. He holds that familia, familiaris and servus in Caesar all cover this dependence, that Caesar preferred the looser familiaris to the more categorical servus, and that servitus in his usage denotes bondage for debt rather than enslavement.)
