= Aylett Sammes =

English antiquary

Aylett Sammes (1636?–1679?) was an English antiquary, noted for his theories of Phoenician influence on the Welsh language.

== Life ==
A grandson of John Sammes, lord of the manor of Little Totham, Essex, and son of Thomas Sammes by his wife Mary (née Jeffrey), he was born at Kelvedon in Essex about 1636. His father's younger brother, Edward, married into the Aylett family of Rivenhall.

In 1648 he entered Felsted School under John Glascock, a Fellow of Christ's College, Cambridge, and a teacher of repute in East Anglia. On 3 July 1655 he was admitted a fellow-commoner of Christ's College; he graduated B.A. in 1657, was admitted to the Inner Temple on 28 October in the same year, and proceeded M.A., probably at Cambridge about 1659, though there appears to be no record of the fact. He was incorporated M.A. at Oxford on 10 July 1677.

Sammes died before the completion of his major work, probably in 1679.

== Works ==
His elaborate Britannia Antiqua Illustrata, or the Antiquities of Ancient Britain derived from the Phœnicians (London, 1676) only appeared as vol. i.. It was licensed by Roger L'Estrange in March 1675, and dedicated to Heneage Finch. The work, which extends to nearly 600 folio pages, brings down the narrative of British history to the conversion of Kent. It deals with the Roman period, but its main thesis is of the Phœnician derivation of the language. It reproduces ancient documents, such as the Laws of King Ina. The views derived from Strabo and the work of John Twyne. Sammes gave etymological reasons connecting Phoenician with Welsh, but did not accept the descent of the Cymry from Gomer.

=== Celtic theories ===
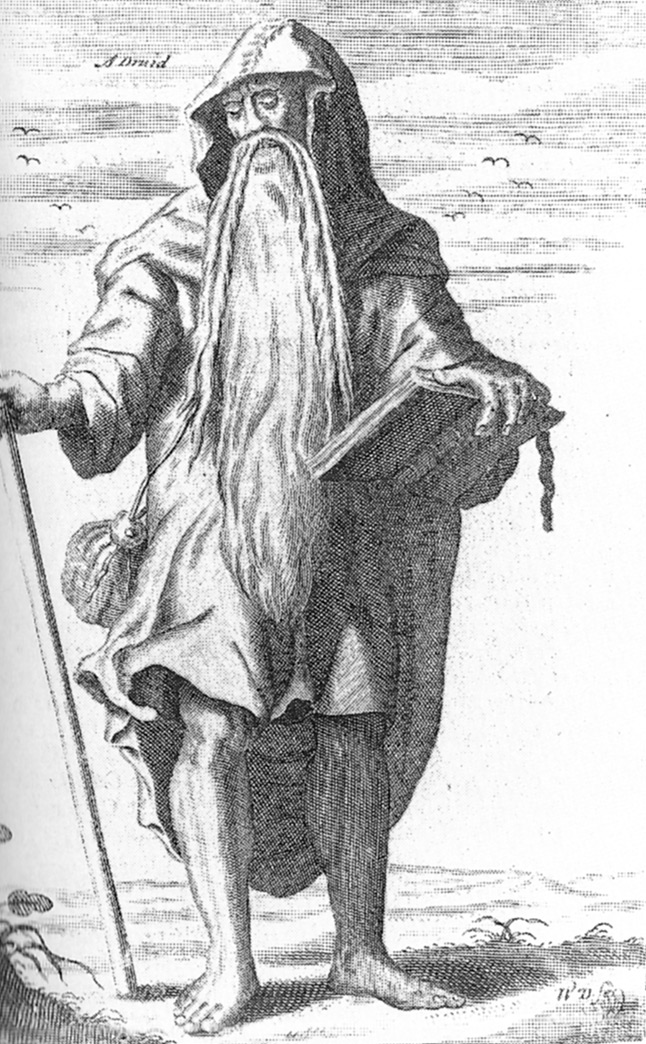
A druid, illustration from Britannia Antiqua Illustrata (1676).

While the specific historical theories brought forward by Sammes were discounted by his contemporaries, his book was a contribution to a number of debates of the time, and its effect on iconography was major. The representations of Celtic druids had been developed from beginnings in Conrad Celtes and the Jani Anglorum (1610) of John Selden. Inigo Jones had made a druid stage design (1638) for Lodowick Carlell's The Passionate Lovers, drawing on earlier pageant representations of Ancient Britons, as a Wild Man. Further iconographic sources drawn upon were of the Green Man and hermits. As represented in Britannia Antiqua Illustrata the druid is a composite of "wild" and "holy". John Wood, the Elder was prepared to take Sammes seriously, in theorising about Stonehenge.

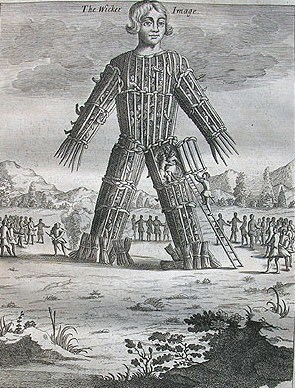
Representation of a wicker man from Britannia Antiqua Illustrata (1676).

The influence of these representations of druids continued until the 19th century and the Costume of the Original Inhabitants of the British Islands (1815) of Samuel Rush Meyrick and Charles Hamilton Smith.

=== Hostile views ===
William Nicolson accused the author of plagiarism from Samuel Bochart, and Anthony Wood reported a rumour that the work was really written by an uncle of Sammes. These aspersions were rebutted by Myles Davies in his Athenæ Britannicæ, and Sammes's erudition was praised by Henry Oldenburg (see Philosophical Transactions No. 124, p. 596).

=== Other works ===
Besides the Britannia Antiqua, he is credited by William Thomas Lowndes with Long Livers: a curious history of such persons of both sexes who have lived several ages and grown young again, London, 1722.

== Notes ==
Attribution

This article incorporates text from a publication now in the public domain: "Sammes, Aylett". Dictionary of National Biography. London: Smith, Elder & Co. 1885–1900.
