= Leyden Manuscript =

4-page leaflet in Breton studies

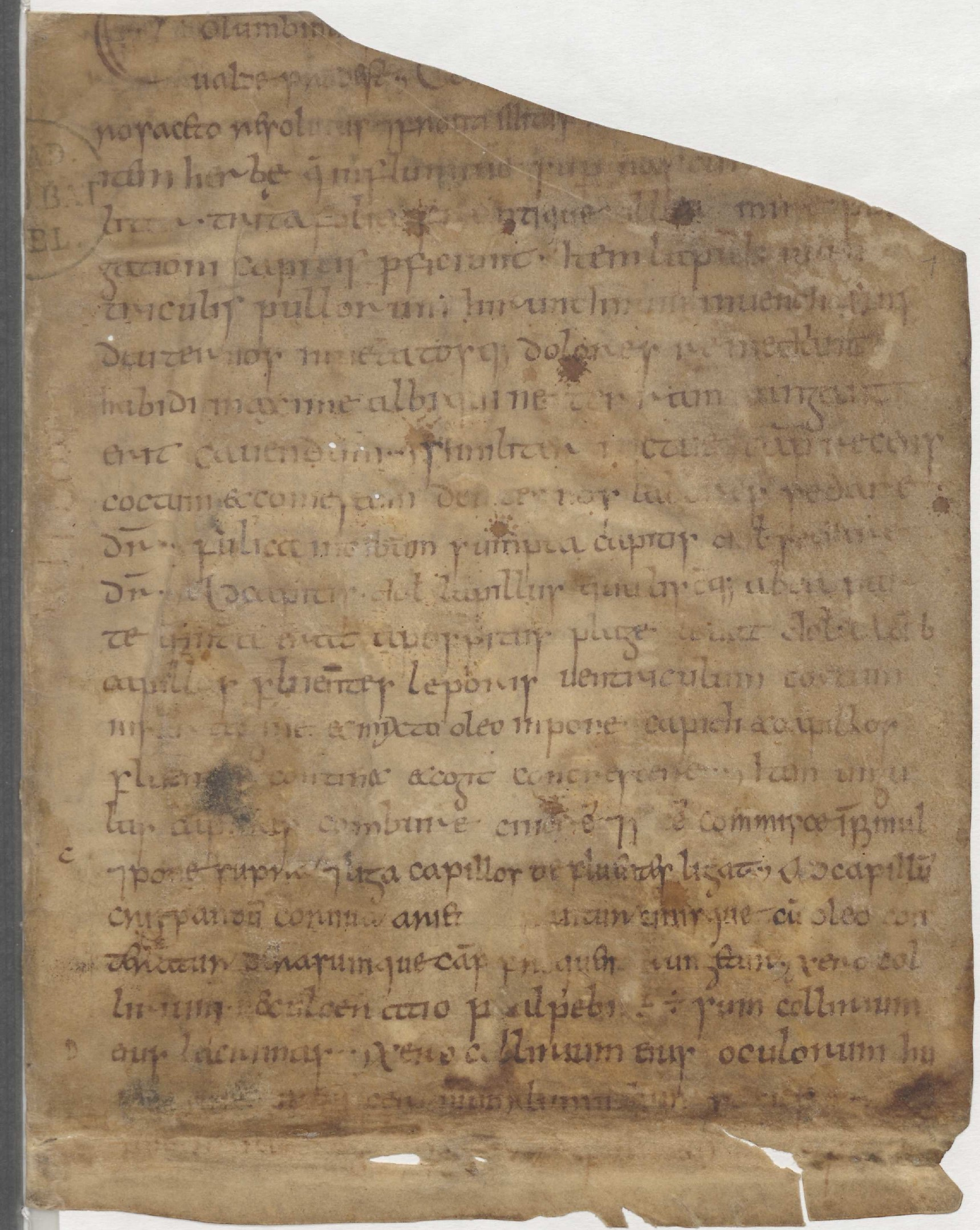
Leyden Manuscript. Medical recipes in Latin, Breton and Cornish, Leiden VLF 96 A. Around 900. Page 1. Leiden University Library.

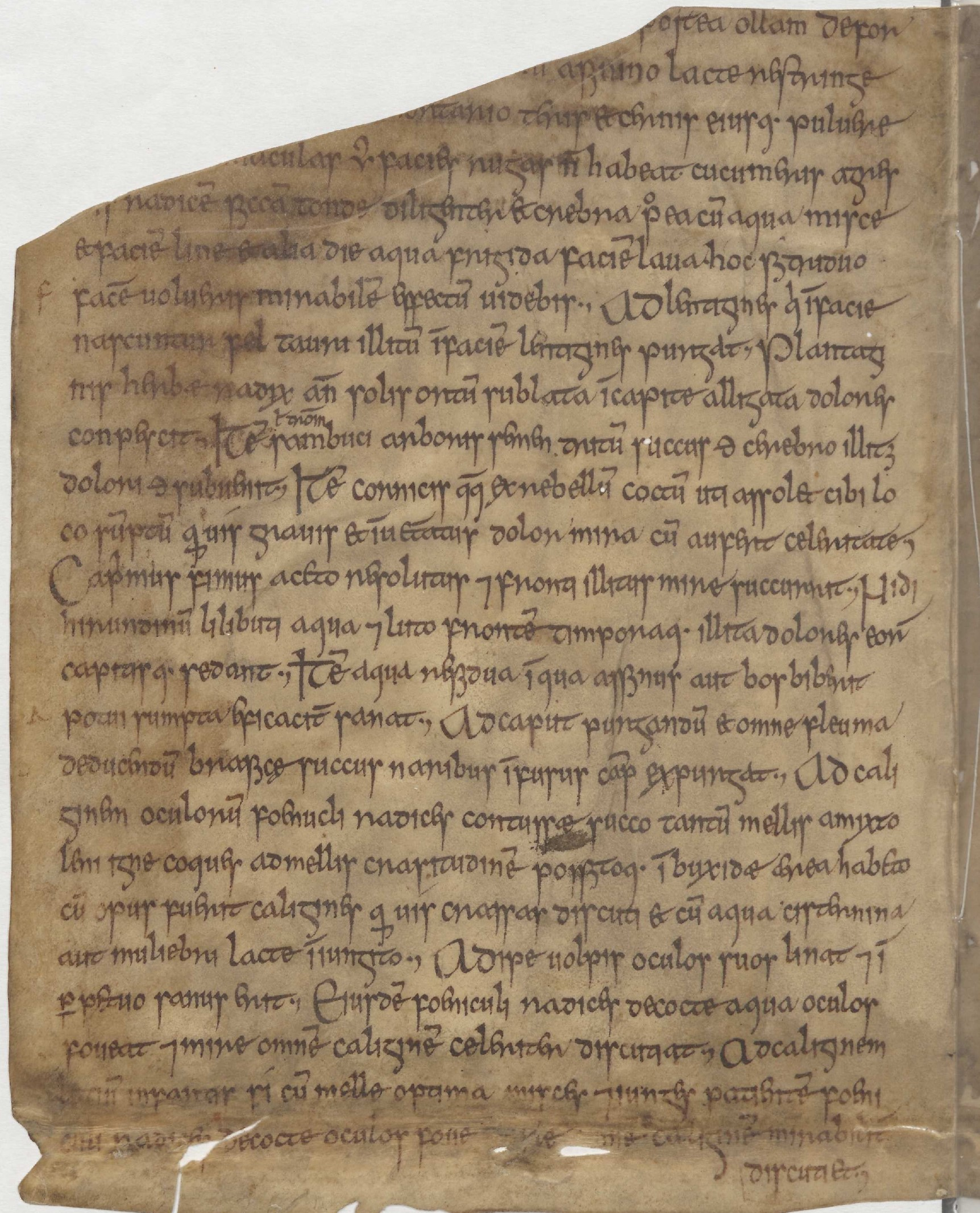
Page 2.

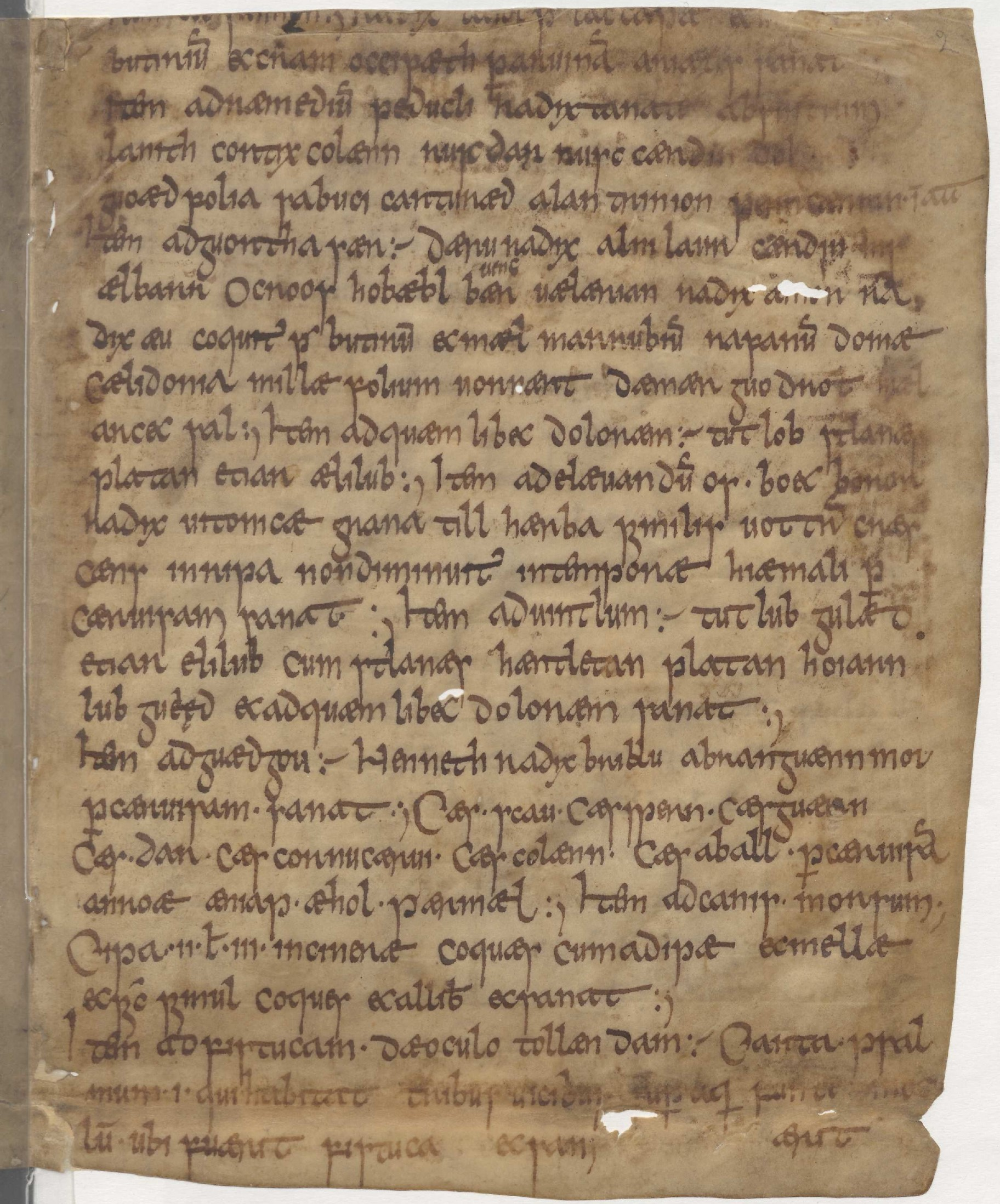
Page 3.

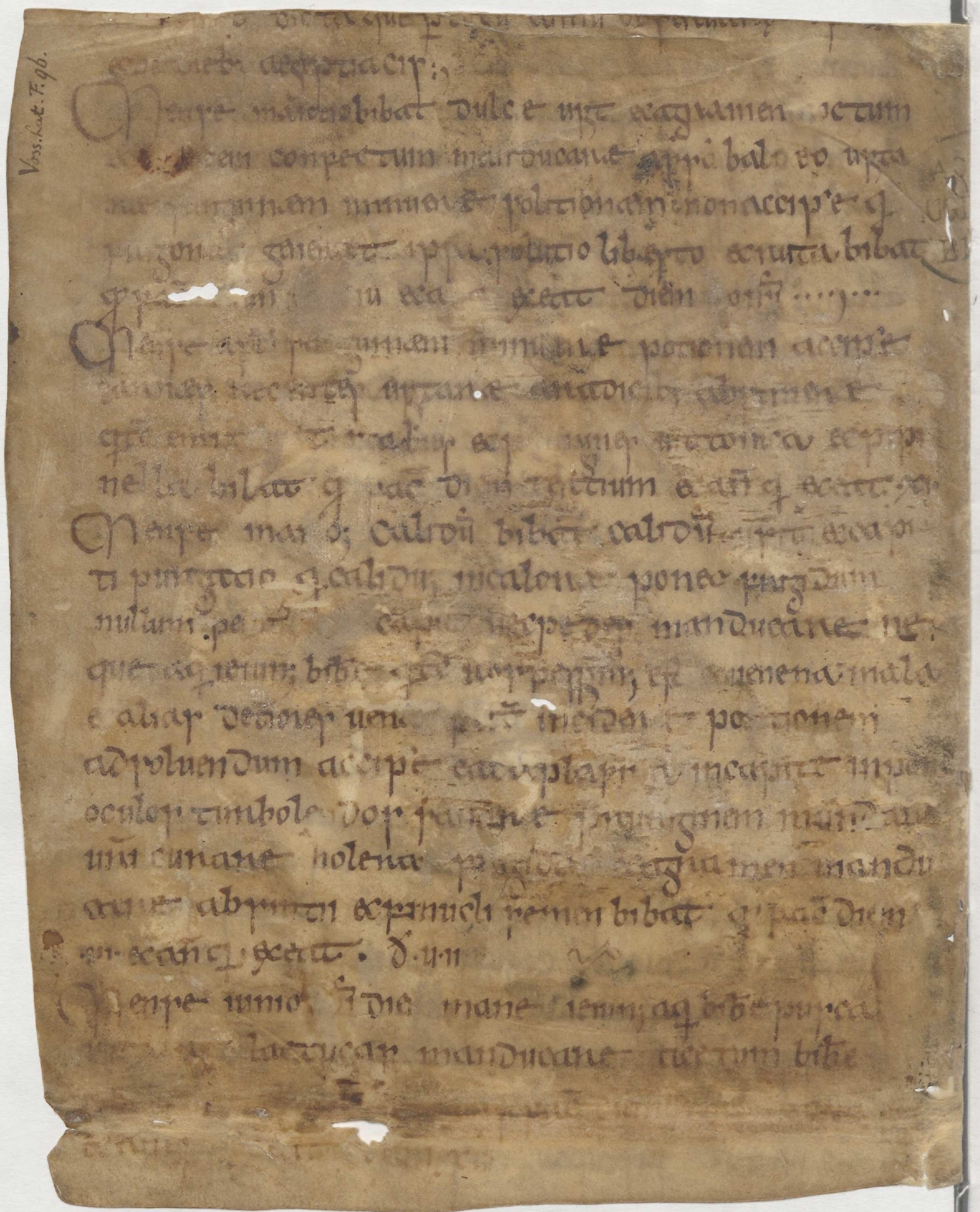
Page 4.

The Leyden manuscript (Breton: Dornskrid Leiden) is the name usually given in Breton studies to a four-page leaflet ("bifolio") kept in Leiden University Libraries in the Netherlands. It is a fragment of a Latin medical treatise supposedly dating from the late 8th or 9th century in which two Irish words appear and about thirty Old Breton words.

== Language and origin ==
Pierre-Yves Lambert thus describes the place held by Breton in this text (translation from French):

Vossianus lat. 96 A has the peculiarity of including Old Breton not in the glosses, but in the main text: it is one of the few documents where the vernacular language is not restricted to secondary use. Nevertheless, Old Breton only intervenes on one page of this bifolio and there it remains subordinate to Latin insofar as it is simply technical words (names of plants, preparations) which are substituted for the corresponding Latin words.

From a literary point of view, Lambert adds:

Leiden's medical fragment is doubtless not typically Breton in the subject: it is a question of ancient or medieval Latin recipes that are constantly being copied in monasteries.

Professor emeritus Hervé Le Bihan from the Breton-Celtic department of Rennes 2 University noted that the origin and date are probably Cornish and the first half of the 10th century, respectively, although the words are closer to Breton.

Heather Stuart found similar or identical manuscript texts, the Laon manuscript Laon 426 folio 117-119, and Amiens ms. Escalopier 2, folio I-XII.

== Breton words found ==
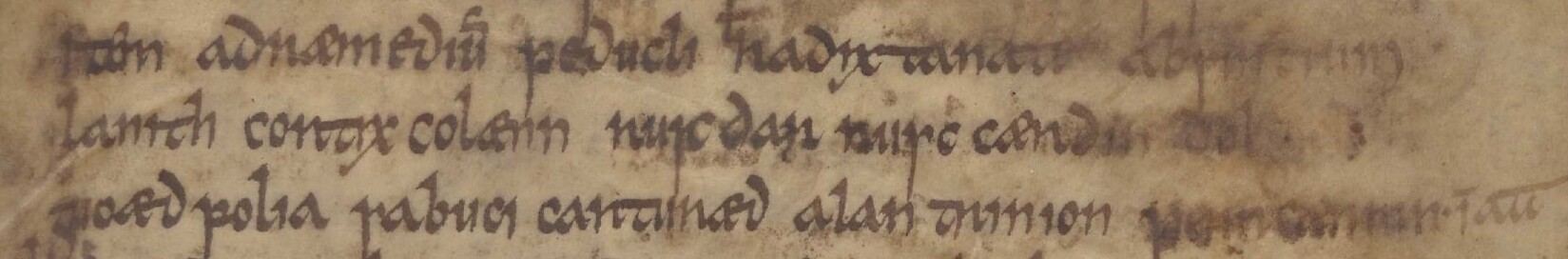
Page 3 lines 3-5, with Breton words underlined: "Item ad raemedium peducli radix tanat absinthium lanith cortix colænn rusc dar rusc cærdin del ... guoæd folia sabuci carturæd alan trinion penn cæninn . inatt".

Some examples of the Breton words found in the manuscript:

- aball: apple
- barr: branch
- cæninn: leek
- cærdinn: mountain-ash
- cæs: search
- colænn: holly
- dar: oak
- guærn: alder tree
- hisæl-barr: mistletoe
- penn: head
- scau: elder tree, sambucus
- spern: thorn (hawthorn, plum tree)

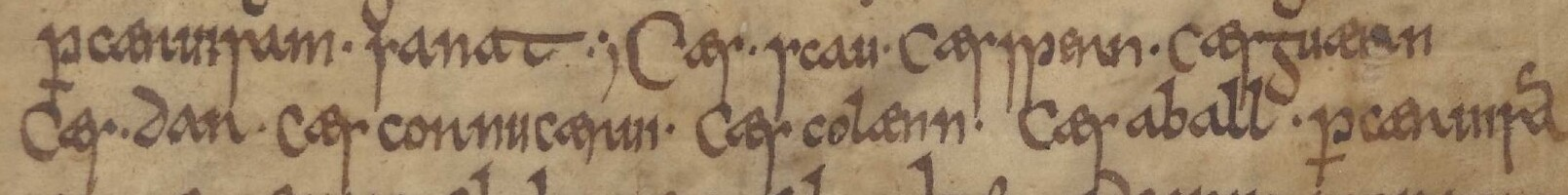
Page 3 lines 17-18, with Breton words underlined: "p[er].cæruisam.sanat.;Cæs.scau.cæsspern.cæsguærn cæs.dar.cæs cornucaerni.cæs colænn.cæs aball.p[er] cæruisa[m]".

== Literature ==
- Lambert, Pierre-Yves (1986). "Le fragment médical latin et vieux-breton du manuscrit de Leyde, Vossianus lat. f°96 A". Bulletin de la Société archéologique de Finistère (in French). 65: 315–327.
- Le Bihan, Hervé (November 2016). "Les origines de la langue bretonne". bcd.bzh (in French). Bretagne : Bretagne culture diversité - Sevenadurioù breizh. Archived from the original on 2025-01-22. "Ainsi, le manuscrit de Leyde présenté jusque-là comme le plus ancien manuscrit en breton n'est sans doute pas d'origine bretonne, mais d'origine cornique. De plus il ne daterait pas de la fin du VIIIe siècle mais plutôt de la première moitié du Xe siècle."
- Stokes, Whitley (1897). "A Celtic Leechbook". Zeitschrift für celtische Philologie: 14–25. This article contains a transcription of the manuscript (pp. 18–21) followed by a glossary (pp. 21–25).
- Stuart, Heather (1979). "A Ninth Century Account of Diets and Dies aegyptiaci". Scriptorium. 33 (2): 237–244. doi:10.3406/scrip.1979.1138.
