= Devotio =

Roman generals vow

In ancient Roman religion, the devotio was an extreme form of votum in which a Roman general vowed to sacrifice his own life in battle along with the enemy to chthonic gods in exchange for a victory. The most extended description of the ritual is given by the Augustan historian Livy, regarding the self-sacrifice of Decius Mus. The English word "devotion" derives from the Latin.

Devotio may be a form of consecratio, a ritual by means of which something was consecrated to the gods. The devotio has sometimes been interpreted in light of human sacrifice in ancient Rome, and Walter Burkert saw it as a form of scapegoat or pharmakos ritual. By the 1st century BC, devotio could mean more generally "any prayer or ritual that consigned some person or thing to the gods of the underworld for destruction."

== The invocation ==
Livy preserves the prayer formula used for making a devotio. Although Livy was writing at a time when the religious innovations of Augustus were often cloaked in old-fashioned piety and appeals to tradition, archaic aspects of the prayer suggest that it is not an invention, but represents a traditional formulary as might be preserved in the official pontifical books. The attending pontifex dictates the wording. The syntax is repetitive and disjointed, unlike prayers given literary dress during this period in the poetry of Ovid and others. The deities invoked—among them the Archaic Triad of Jupiter, Mars, and Quirinus—belong to the earliest religious traditions of Rome. Livy explains that he will record the archaic ritual of devotio at length because "the memory of every human and religious custom has withered from a preference for everything novel and foreign."

The prayer is uttered by Publius Decius Mus, the consul of 340 BC, during the Samnite Wars. He vows to offer himself as a sacrifice to the infernal gods when a battle between the Romans and the senones and samnites has become desperate:

The pontifex instructed him to don the toga praetexta, to veil his head and, with one hand held out from under his toga touching his chin, to stand on a spear laid under his feet and speak as follows: 'Janus, Jupiter, Mars Pater, Quirinus, Bellona, Lares, divine Novensiles, divine Indigetes, gods whose power extends over us and over our enemies, divine Manes, I pray to you, I revere you, I beg your favour and beseech you that you advance the strength and success of the Roman people … As I have pronounced in these words … I devote the legions and auxiliaries of the enemy along with myself, to the divine Manes and to Earth.'

Both the Lares and the Manes are often regarded in ancient sources as the deified dead.

Macrobius says that the general who offers himself "touches the earth while saying Tellus, and raises his hands toward heaven when pronouncing the name of Jupiter."

== Evocatio ==
Another votum that might be made in the field by a general was the evocatio, a ritual by means of which the tutelary deity of the enemy, particularly that of a city under siege, might be induced to come over to the Roman cause by the promise of superior cult.

== Other devotiones ==
Tacitus refers to the magic charms uncovered in connection with the poisoning of Germanicus as devotiones, indicating that the word had expanded its meaning to include other ritual acts in which an individual sought to harm and even kill another.
