= Pierre-Yves Lambert =

French linguist (born 1949)

- Born: 30 May 1949 (age 77)
- Citizenship: French
- Occupation: Linguist

Academic background
- Education: École Normale Supérieure (1969)

Academic work
- Institutions: CNRS; École Pratique des Hautes Études
- Notable works: La langue gauloise (1994)

Pierre-Yves Lambert (born 30 May 1949) is a French linguist and scholar of Celtic studies. He is a researcher at the CNRS and a lecturer at the École Pratique des Hautes Études in Celtic linguistics and philology. Lambert is the director of the journal Études Celtiques.

Lambert specializes in the history of the Celtic languages and the study of Celtic literature, in particular the Old Irish, Old Breton, Middle Welsh and Gaulish languages. He is the author of an influential book on the Gaulish language entitled La langue gauloise (1994).

Along with Xavier Delamarre, Lambert is also the co-administrator of Thesaurus Paleo-Celticus, a CNRS project launched in 2019 and aiming to update and replace Alfred Holder's Alt-celtischer Sprachschatz (1913).

== Biography ==
Born on 30 May 1949, Pierre-Yves Lambert graduated from the École Normale Supérieure in 1969. He collaborated on the Recueil des Inscriptions Gauloises. (2002). He received the Derek Allen Prize in 2015.

== Published works ==
- 1981: Les Littératures celtiques, Presses universitaires de France, series Que sais-je?, Paris
- 1983: Le Lexique Étymologique de l'Irlandais Ancien de J. Vendryes, in: Bachellery, Édouard and Pierre-Yves Lambert, Das etymologische Wörterbuch : Fragen der Konzeption und Gestaltung, pp. 17–24, Alfred Bammesberger, ed. Regensberg : Friedrich Pustet
- 1985: Les gloses bibliques de Jean Scot : l'élément vieil-irlandais, Études celtiques, XXII, p. 205-224.
- 1986: Les gloses celtiques aux commentaires de Virgile, Études celtiques, XXIII, p. 81-128.
- 1987: Les gloses grammaticales brittoniques, Études celtiques, XXIV, p. 285-308.
- 1994: La langue gauloise: description linguistique, commentaire d'inscriptions choisies, Errance, Paris, (Collection des Hesperides).
- 1993: Anonymous, Les Quatre branches du Mabinogi, translated from medium Welsh, presented and annotated by Pierre-Yves Lambert, Éditions Gallimard, series "L’aube des peuples", Paris, ISBN 2-07-073201-0.
- 1996: Anthologie de la poésie irlandaise du XXe siècle, under the direction of Jean-Yves Masson, Gaelic authors chosen and presented by Pierre-Yves Lambert, bilingual edition
- 1997: L’impersonnel en celtique, in Scribthair a ainm n-ogaim, Scritti in memoria di Enrico Campanile, Pise, II, p. 491-514.
- 1996: Lexique étymologique de l'irlandais ancien (initiated by Joseph Vendryes), fasc. B-1980, C-1987

== See also ==
- Celts
- Celtic languages
- Bibliography on Celtic civilization
- Leyden Manuscript
