= Andreas Hofeneder =

Austrian ancient historian and Celticist (born 1974)

- Born: 8 June 1974 (age 52); Vienna, Austria
- Citizenship: Austrian

Academic background
- Education: University of Vienna
- Doctoral advisor: Gerhard Dobesch, Helmut Birkhan

Academic work
- Discipline: Ancient history, Celtic studies
- Institutions: University of Vienna • University of Greifswald • University of Salzburg
- Main interests: Celtic religion in ancient literature, Appian
- Notable works: Die Religion der Kelten in den antiken literarischen Zeugnissen (2005–2011)

Andreas Hofeneder (born 8 June 1974) is an Austrian ancient historian and Celticist. He is best known for Die Religion der Kelten in den antiken literarischen Zeugnissen (2005–2011), a three-volume collection, translation and commentary of the Greek and Latin literary testimonia for Celtic religion, published by the Austrian Academy of Sciences. He has also edited and annotated parts of the Roman History of Appian, and is a co-editor of the journal Keltische Forschungen.

== Education and career ==
Hofeneder was born in Vienna on 8 June 1974. He attended the humanistic branch of the Schottengymnasium in Vienna, and from 1992 studied ancient history, classical studies and classical archaeology at the University of Vienna, graduating Mag. phil. in 1998. He took his doctorate at Vienna in 2003 with a dissertation on the ancient literary testimonia for Celtic religion, supervised by Gerhard Dobesch and Helmut Birkhan, and completed his Habilitation in ancient history there in 2018.

Hofeneder has been a lecturer (Lektor) at the University of Vienna since 2003, and has held a series of research and teaching posts funded mainly by the Austrian Science Fund and the Austrian Academy of Sciences, several of them at the university's Institut für Alte Geschichte. He was a research associate at the University of Greifswald from 2018 to 2020, held a temporary professorship at the University of Münster in 2021 and 2022, and was a senior scientist at the University of Salzburg from 2023 to 2025. He has co-edited the journal Keltische Forschungen since 2010 and sits on the scientific advisory board of the Societas Celtologica Europaea.

== Work ==
Hofeneder's principal work is Die Religion der Kelten in den antiken literarischen Zeugnissen ('the religion of the Celts in the ancient literary testimonia'), published in three volumes by the Austrian Academy of Sciences: Von den Anfängen bis Caesar (2005), Von Cicero bis Florus (2008), and Von Arrianos bis zum Ausklang der Antike (2011). It gathers the Greek and Latin literary passages bearing on Celtic religion, each printed in the original with a German translation and a detailed commentary, the authors arranged in broadly chronological order. The work follows and updates the Fontes Historiae Religionis Celticae assembled by Johannes Zwicker in 1934–1936, but confines itself to the ancient literary evidence. Reviewing the first volume, Holger Müller commended its commentary, its clear organisation and its command of current research.

Hofeneder has also produced an edition, translation and commentary of the Celtic section (Keltiké) of Appian's Roman History (Appians Keltiké, 2018), and has worked on Appian's other fragmentary books.

== Selected publications ==
- Die Religion der Kelten in den antiken literarischen Zeugnissen. Sammlung, Übersetzung und Kommentierung, 3 vols. Mitteilungen der Prähistorischen Kommission 59, 66, 75. Vienna: Verlag der Österreichischen Akademie der Wissenschaften, 2005–2011.
  - Bd. I: Von den Anfängen bis Caesar. 2005.
  - Bd. II: Von Cicero bis Florus. 2008.
  - Bd. III: Von Arrianos bis zum Ausklang der Antike. 2011.
- Appians Keltiké. Einleitung, Text, Übersetzung und Kommentar. Tyche Supplementband 9. Vienna, 2018.
- editor, with Patrizia de Bernardo Stempel, Théonymie celtique, cultes, interpretatio / Keltische Theonymie, Kulte, interpretatio. Mitteilungen der Prähistorischen Kommission 79. Vienna, 2013.
