= Jean-Louis Brunaux =

French archaeologist (1953–2026)

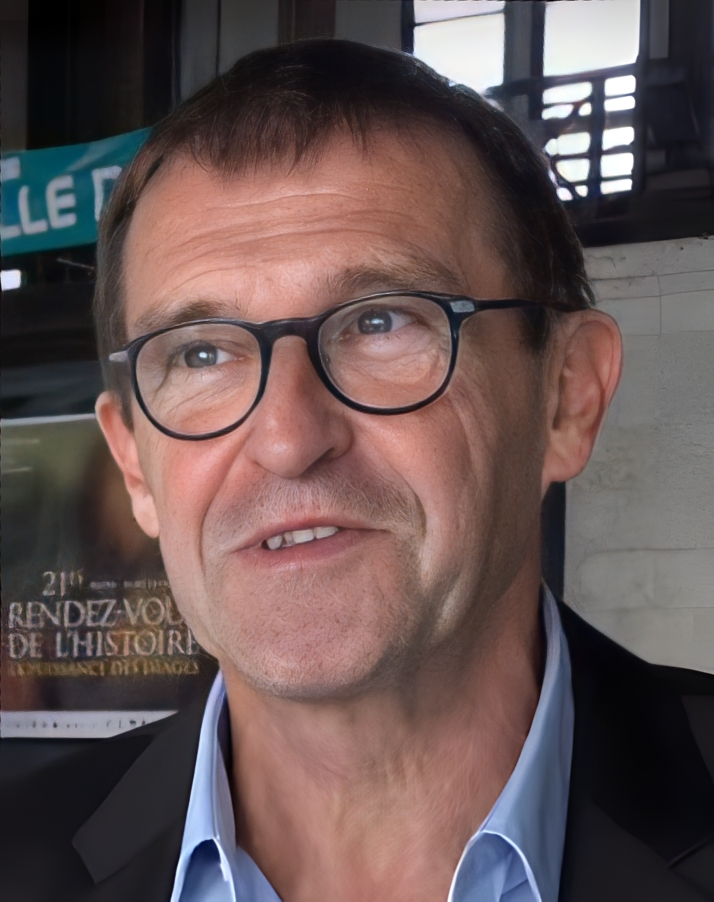
- Born: 1953; Lachelle, France
- Died: 18 August 2026 (aged 72)
- Known for: Excavation of the sanctuaries at Gournay-sur-Aronde and Ribemont-sur-Ancre
- Scientific career
- Fields: Archaeology
- Workplaces: CNRS

Jean-Louis Brunaux (1953 – 18 August 2026) was a French archaeologist and historian, a researcher at the Centre national de la recherche scientifique (CNRS), attached to the archaeology laboratory of the École normale supérieure. He specialised in the religion and society of Gaul in the Iron Age. Brunaux directed the excavation of the sanctuaries at Gournay-sur-Aronde and Ribemont-sur-Ancre in Picardy, which produced the largest deposits of Iron Age weaponry known from northern Europe. Brunaux is also known for his account of the druids, whom he presented as a learned order closer to Greek philosophers than to the sacrificing priesthood of earlier scholarship.

== Early life ==
Brunaux was born in 1953, the son of a garage owner, and grew up in the Oise. He had trained as a sociologist. His interest in archaeology developed early, and by his early twenties he was working with Roger Agache, one of the pioneers of aerial archaeology in Picardy. At the age of 22 he noticed potsherds freshly turned up by a plough in a field near his home, and a short distance away an iron spearhead of Gaulish appearance. The find led him to the sanctuary at Gournay-sur-Aronde, which he excavated between 1975 and 1984.

== Career ==
Brunaux, an archaeologist and historian of antiquity and of the Gauls, joined the CNRS in 1984, where he was attached to the archaeology laboratory of the École normale supérieure. He went on to excavate other Belgic sanctuaries in Picardy, the most important being Ribemont-sur-Ancre in the Somme. The excavation of these sites established his reputation in the study of Gaulish religion. He said that religion offers the most direct route to understanding a past society, and his fieldwork has concentrated on cult sites rather than on settlements. Among French scholars of Gaul he had been associated with Christian Goudineau. In 2013 he received the Prix du Sénat du livre d'histoire for his book Alésia.

== Works ==
=== Gournay-sur-Aronde and Ribemont-sur-Ancre ===
Between the 1970s and the 1990s Brunaux excavated two large Belgic sanctuaries in Picardy, at Gournay-sur-Aronde and Ribemont-sur-Ancre. Both were rectangular enclosures of timber and mud-brick. At Gournay some two thousand weapons and pieces of armour had been fixed around the precinct and its gateway, while at Ribemont the broken and burned bones of hundreds of young men lay in crematoria built from human remains, and eighty headless bodies were displayed with weapons along the outer wall. Together the sites hold the largest collections of Iron Age weaponry known from northern Europe.

Brunaux first read the remains as confirmation of the human sacrifice reported by Caesar and Diodorus, and later interpreted Gournay as the sanctuary of a war god, where the arms and heads of defeated enemies were dedicated as trophies. For Ribemont he reconstructed a single battle, which he dated to around 260 BC and, from coin finds, ascribed to a victory of the Ambiani over a people from the region of Lisieux. Other readings have been proposed, from war memorials to the tribe's own dead, suggested by the British archaeologist Martin Brown, to a shrine raised after one great battle, and Ronald Hutton considers the evidence to favour these over the sacrificial one. In Brunaux's view the sanctuaries also show that the Gauls built substantial cult places rather than worshipping only in groves, contrary to a common inference from Pliny.

=== The druids ===
In Les druides (2006) Brunaux presents the druids as a learned class, closer to Greek natural philosophers than to a bloodthirsty priesthood, and holds that most of what is known of them goes back to Posidonius, whom Caesar largely follows. On his account they officiated in the open sanctuaries revealed by archaeology rather than in hidden groves, reserved the use of writing to themselves, and sought to limit the power of chiefs and the violence of Gaulish society. Ronald Hutton renders this picture as an order of holy men in "pagan monasteries" of worship and learning, present to lend sanctity to public occasions but shedding no blood, and records Brunaux's argument that the Coligny calendar resembles Greek models and may be a local version of one. François Dufay notes a tension between these irenic druids and the warlike society shown by Brunaux's own excavations. Brunaux has also disputed established attributions, holding for instance that the Gundestrup cauldron is Cimbric work of the Roman period rather than Celtic.

=== Reception ===
In his history of the druids in Britain, Ronald Hutton places Brunaux among the scholars who see them as a learned, non-sacrificing élite rather than as tribal priests centrally involved in ritual killing. Hutton sets this against harsher readings, such as those of Stuart Piggott and Anne Ross, and observes that specialists have drawn markedly different portraits of the druids from the same limited body of classical texts, choosing among them at will. He credits Brunaux's excavations with disproving the long-held belief, derived from Pliny, that the Gauls built no substantial sanctuaries. At the same time he stresses that the archaeological evidence remains open to more than one interpretation and has not settled which of the ancient images of the druids is correct.

== Death ==
Brunaux died on 18 August 2026, at the age of 72.

== Selected publications ==
- Brunaux, Jean-Louis (1986). Les Gaulois: sanctuaires et rites [The Gauls: Sanctuaries and Rites]. Paris: Errance. ISBN 978-2-903442-27-9.
- Brunaux, Jean-Louis; Rapin, André (1988). Gournay II: boucliers et lances, dépôts et trophées. Paris: Errance. ISBN 978-2-903442-75-0.
- Brunaux, Jean-Louis (1988). The Celtic Gauls: Gods, Rites and Sanctuaries. London: Seaby. ISBN 978-1-85264-009-5.
- Brunaux, Jean-Louis (1996). Les religions gauloises: rituels celtiques de la Gaule indépendante [Gaulish Religions: Celtic Rituals of Independent Gaul]. Paris: Errance. ISBN 2-87772-128-0.
- Brunaux, Jean-Louis (2003). Guerre et religion en Gaule: essai d'anthropologie celtique [War and Religion in Gaul: An Essay in Celtic Anthropology]. Paris: Errance. ISBN 2-87772-259-7.
- Brunaux, Jean-Louis (2006). Les druides: des philosophes chez les barbares [The Druids: Philosophers among the Barbarians]. Paris: Seuil. ISBN 978-2-02-079653-8.
- Brunaux, Jean-Louis (2008). Nos ancêtres les Gaulois [Our Ancestors the Gauls]. Paris: Seuil. ISBN 978-2-02-094321-5.
- Brunaux, Jean-Louis (2012). Alésia: 27 septembre 52 av. J.-C. Paris: Gallimard. ISBN 978-2-07-012357-5.
- Brunaux, Jean-Louis (2014). Les Celtes: histoire d'un mythe [The Celts: History of a Myth]. Paris: Belin. ISBN 978-2-7011-7719-9.
- Brunaux, Jean-Louis (2018). Vercingétorix. Paris: Gallimard. ISBN 978-2-07-017892-6.
- Brunaux, Jean-Louis (2024). La cité des druides: bâtisseurs de l'ancienne Gaule [The City of the Druids: Builders of Ancient Gaul]. Paris: Gallimard. ISBN 978-2-07-014103-6.
