= Cherré (archaeological site) =

Archaeological site in France

Coordinates: 47°39′45″N 0°14′7″E

Cherré Archaeological Site
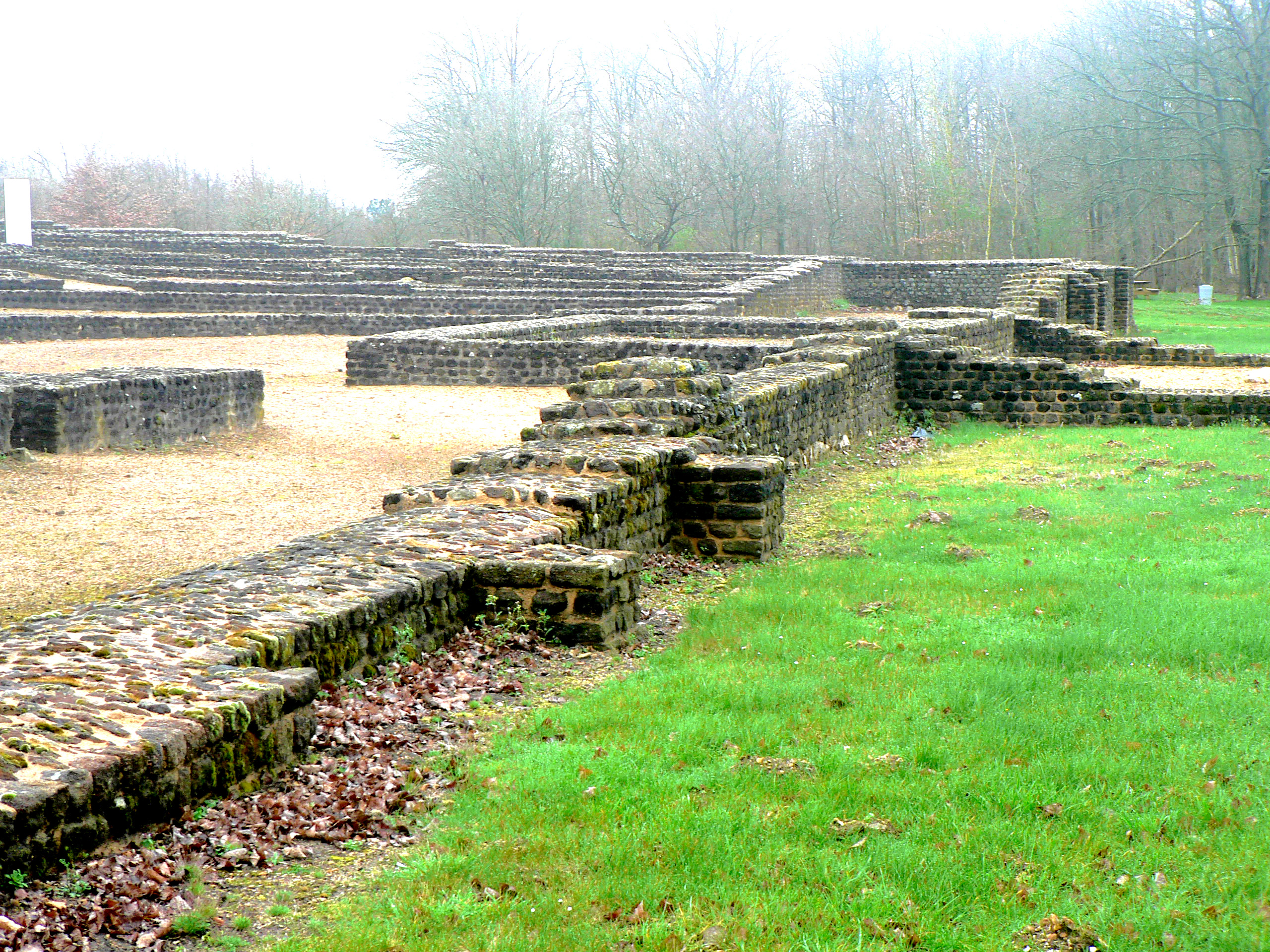
- The theater, view towards the northwest
- Interactive map of Cherré Archaeological Site
- Type: Classified natural site Classified MH
- Periods: 1st century-3rd century
- Location: France
- Region: Sarthe

Site notes
- Elevation: 40 to 45 m (131 to 148 ft)

Cherré is the site of the archaeological excavation of a Gallo-Roman complex of 20 hectares from the 1st to the 3rd centuries A.D. It is situated in the town Aubigné-Racan, in the Sarthe département of western France, in the région Pays de la Loire.

The site, at the crossroads of the territories of the Andecavi, the Aulerci Cenomani, and the Turones, is initially a necropolis from the Hallstatt and then La Tène periods, comprising megaliths, tumuli, burials, and ritual weapon deposits. The necropolis is likely related to a fortified promontory located nearby. The Gallo-Roman complex, whose construction began towards the end of the 1st century, reached its peak in the 2nd and 3rd centuries and then extended over more than forty hectares. However, it does not appear to have been permanently occupied, as evidenced by the lack of clear traces of habitation or structured roadways. During this period, the Cherré complex is described as a "secondary agglomeration with predominantly religious functions", dedicated to the imperial cult or a warrior cult, serving as a place for seasonal, commercial, and religious gatherings. Its use ceased in the 4th century. Its monuments, thereafter abandoned, were used as a stone quarry for new constructions in the Middle Ages, particularly Romanesque churches. Its ruins, located on the right bank of the Loir River, were known as early as the beginning of the 18th century, but it was only formally identified as an ancient site in 1875, with in-depth studies beginning in the 1970s.

State-led excavations, undertaken in 1976 by Claude Lambert and Jean Rioufreyt and continued until 2006, uncovered the Hallstatt necropolis, an ancient theater with three thousand seats, a building possibly serving a dual purpose (forum and macellum), two temples, one of which is externally quite similar to the Maison Carrée in Nîmes, Roman baths, and an aqueduct supplying the entire site. Other buildings, whose functions are unknown, have been located but remain to be studied.

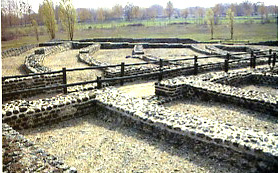
Roman theater of Cherré

Cherré is a classified natural site since 1975. The theater was classified as a historic monument in 1982, and in 1991, all other remains were protected by listing. The site is owned by the Sarthe Departmental Council, which, since the second half of the 2000s, has been making improvements to facilitate access to the ancient ruins and provide better information to the public.

== Location and environment ==
The Cherré site in its environment

Plan of the ancient site

The Cherré site is located in the far south of the department of Sarthe, near Indre-et-Loire and Maine-et-Loire. It is situated, as the crow flies, 3.9 kilometres (2.4 mi) southwest of the communal capital of Aubigné-Racan, on either side of the D 305 road connecting Vaas to the east with Le Lude to the west. The Aubigné-Racan hamlet is 40 kilometres (25 mi) from Le Mans and 30 kilometres (19 mi) from Laval.

Spanning more than 500 metres (1,600 ft) from north to south, it covers over forty hectares at an altitude gradually decreasing from 45 metres (148 ft) at the level of the theater and market-forum to 40 metres (130 ft) near the baths. A rocky ridge, peaking at an altitude of 95 metres (312 ft), overlooks the complex to the west, and its southern end was fortified during the Bronze Age. Its area lies within a large meander on the right bank of the Loir River, which flows 600 metres (2,000 ft) away; a marshy area occupied part of the site during ancient times, particularly around the large temple and further south towards the Loir.

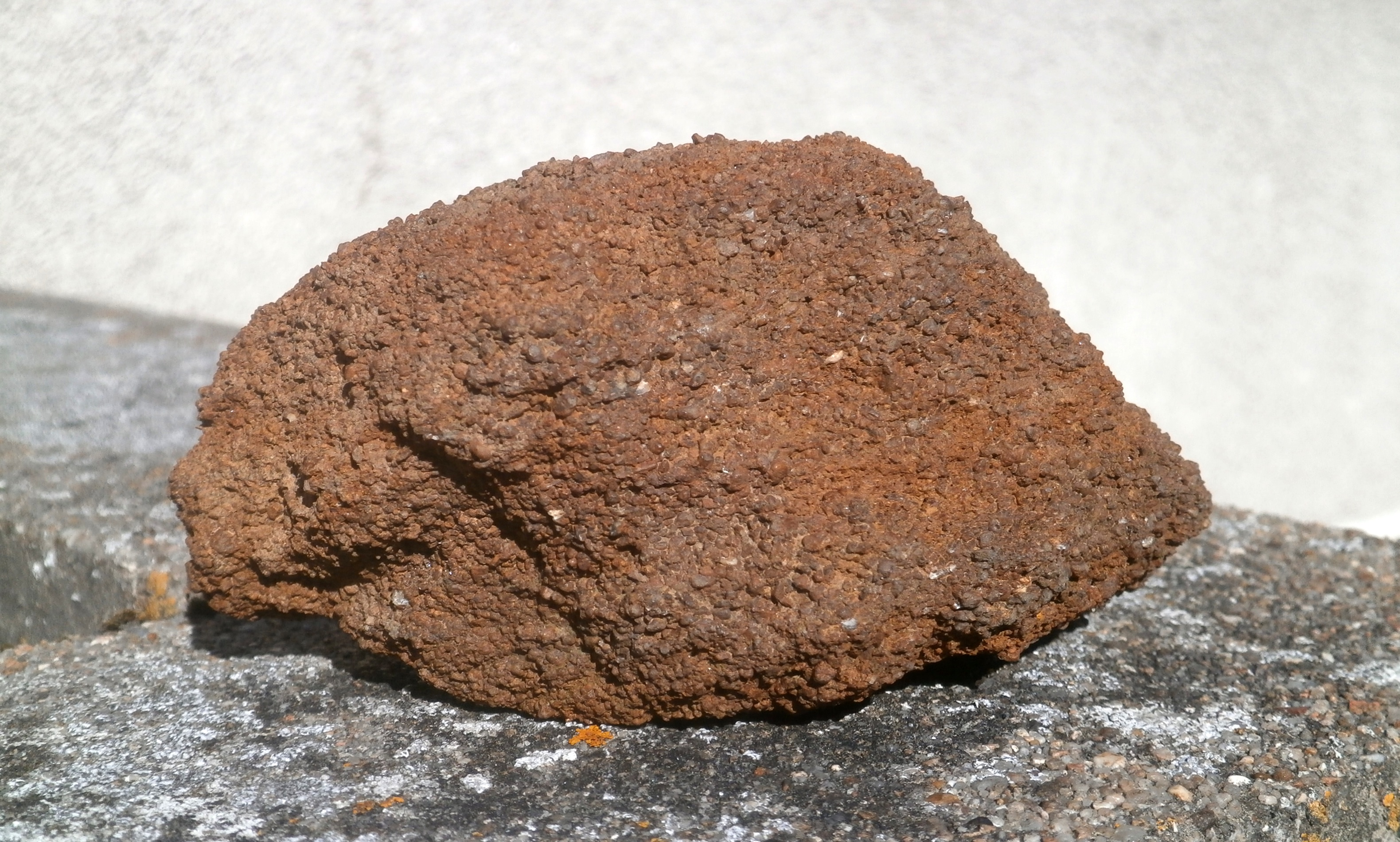
Roussard sandstone block (Cherré)

In the neighboring commune of Coulongé, there are deposits of sandstone, primarily a Cenomanian reddish roussard sandstone, used for the first phase of monument construction, as well as a whiter sandstone used during renovations or expansions in the 2nd century. Sandstone was preferred over the tuffeau that forms the Loir hillside on its left bank. A quarry near the Laval agglomeration likely supplied cut limestone blocks in pink for several Gallo-Roman monuments at the Cherré site, particularly for their decorative elements.

The discovery of a via romana, called the "Roman Road," whose use continued into the Early Middle Ages, and which crosses the commune of Saulges in a straight line along the road to Chenu, raises several hypotheses. The Vaas archaeological site may indicate a junction of a road network, heading northwest downstream of the Loir River crossing. This route, though located at a connection point, retains its original orientation to reach Vindunum (Le Mans) on one hand and Chenu on the other. Although the remains of this ancient route are discontinuous, the direction of one of its two branches suggests it passes through the northwest area of the Aubigné-Racan commune. Recent archaeological prospection work in this Sarthe region (arrondissement of La Flèche and canton of Le Lude), (Note: The results and reports of these studies were published under the direction of Jean-Philippe Bouvet in the work Carte archéologique de la Gaule : La Sarthe (72), p. 87) confirms that Vaas, near Cherré, is crossed by an ancient road linking Vindunum to Cæsarodunum (present-day Tours). The remains of this Gallo-Roman route, though partial, have been clearly identified in the Vaas territory at the place called "Gué de La Pierre".

In 2001, a bust of a putto in bronze (likely an applique, 8.1 centimetres (3.2 in) high), currently housed at the Musée d'archéologie et d'histoire du Mans in Le Mans, was discovered by chance. 1.9 kilometres (1.2 mi) east-southeast of Cherré, on the left bank of the Loir, at "la Bodinière" (Vaas). Dated to the first half of the 1st century, it is comparable to finds from the ancient sites of Berrouaghia in Algeria or Volubilis archaeological site in Morocco. Following this discovery, and despite the site being partially disturbed by the establishment of the railway line connecting Aubigné-Racan to Sablé-sur-Sarthe in 1863, a Roman villa, possibly belonging to a notable who contributed to the construction of part of the Gallo-Roman complex, was discovered through surveys conducted by Claude Lambert and Jean Rioufreyt in 2004. It consists of two buildings symmetrically framing a central courtyard; the bronze applique, likely imported from the region of Rome or Alexandria, attests to its decorative opulence.

== Toponymy ==
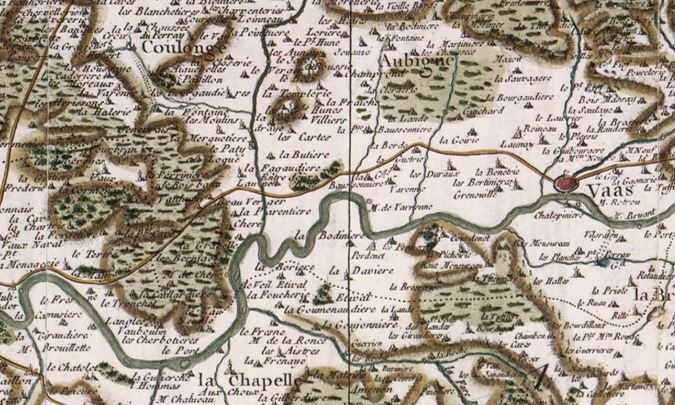
Cherré on the Cassini map

Eugène Vallée and Robert Latouche, in their Dictionnaire topographique du département de la Sarthe published in 1952, note for Cherré, in the commune of Aubigné-Racan, the mentions of the Hubert Jaillot map (Cherray in 1706), the Cassini map (Cheré around 1765), then those of the État-Major map (Cheray in 1820–1866), and finally the mention of Cherray in a text by François Liger in 1896. The same authors, along with Ernest Nègre, also mention two very old references, Karaico in a document from 616 and decima de Cherreio in 1170; Vallée and Latouche attribute these toponyms to Cherré, a commune bordering La Ferté-Bernard, following Thomas Cauvin (1845). A study conducted in the early 2000s by Jean-Pierre Brunterc'h, chief heritage conservator, shows that the assimilation of Kariacus (corrected form of Karaico) to Cherré (Aubigné-Racan) is a plausible hypothesis.

The toponym may derive from the Latin term carrus or currus, whose Gallic equivalent is karros, or from the Latin carretta, meaning "cart", (Note: In this specific case, Xavier Delamarre points out that the term (carrus), commonly used among Celtic and Italic populations, refers to the "four-wheeled cart" or "war chariot". Many European toponyms have a linguistic structure rooted in the word carrus.) "chariot", or "cart". The term, combined with the suffix -iacum or -iacus to form "Carriacus" (or Kariacus) and carruca, a Latin declension, is attested in some texts by Pliny the Elder and generally refers to a two-wheeled cart or a plow. This word can also be accompanied by the Latin declensions -a or -ulum. This term encompasses notions related to "transport", particularly for economic purposes. It would thus indicate the proximity of a frequented ancient or medieval road used by carts and chariots, or, more precisely, a "path used by carts".

== Prehistory to contemporary period ==
=== Neolithic and protohistory ===
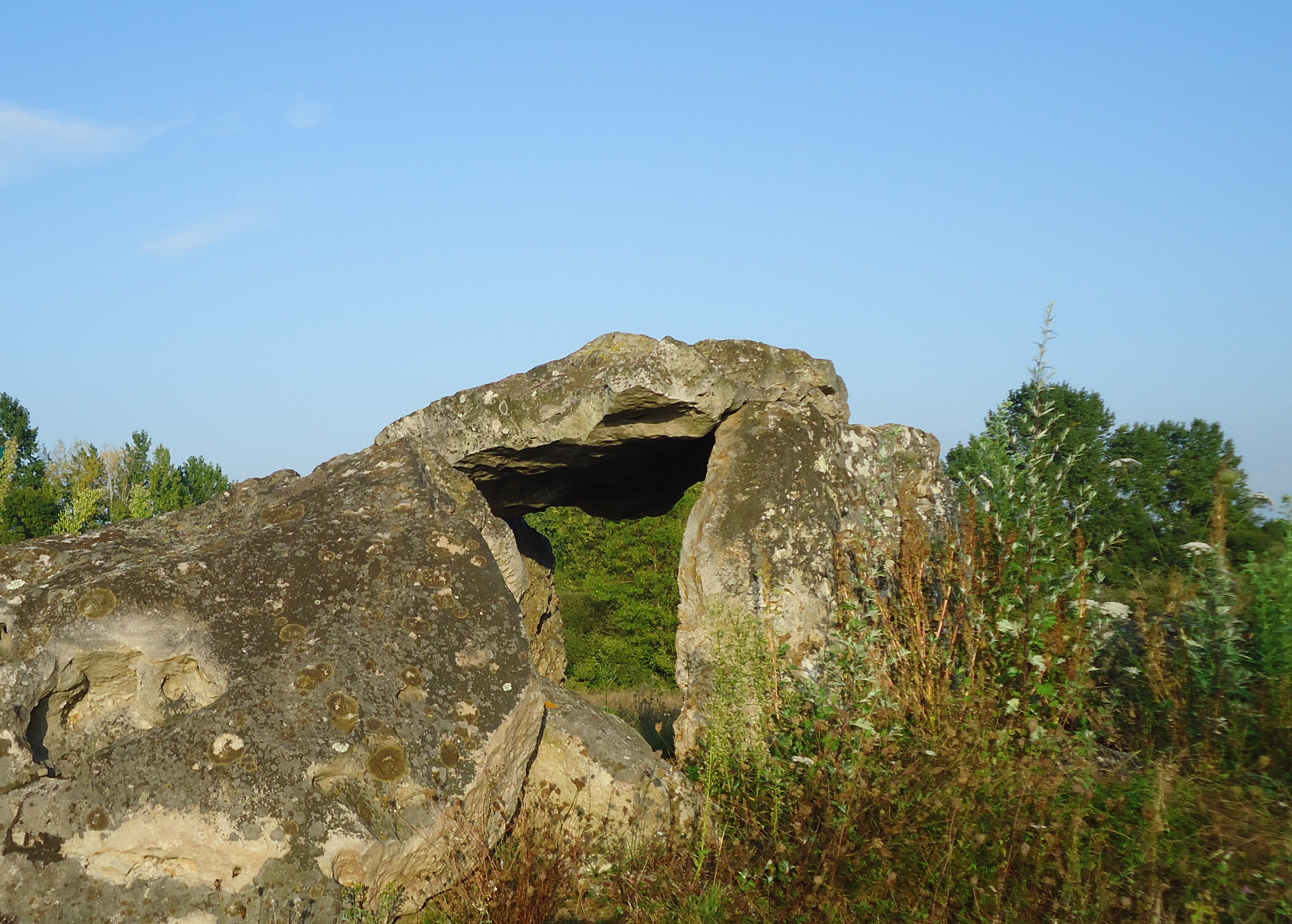
Dolmen of Amenon

Permanent human presence in the south of Sarthe dates back at least to the Neolithic. A megalithic complex, the Dolmen of Amenon, excavated in the 1970s at Saint-Germain-d'Arcé, was used as a burial site at the end of the fourth millennium BCE. Numerous other dolmens (Note: Two of these dolmens, which have been recorded and inventoried, are part of the 18 J collection of Paul Cordonnier. They have been classified under the names "la Pierre" and "le Colombie": Françoise Mirouse; Dominique Dufay-Perré; Robert Chanaud (1994). La Collection Paul Cordonnier [The Paul Cordonnier Collection] (PDF) (in French). ads. p. 101.. These elements of megalithic structures were respectively identified near the farms of "la Persillière" and "le Colombier".) or menhirs are reported in Aubigné-Racan and in neighboring communes, such as Vaas (Dolmen de la Pierre couverte) or Dissay-sous-Courcillon, as well as several protohistoric enclosures.

On the edge of the site, mounds have been reported. These cultic sites, dated to the end of the Bronze Age and the "Hallstatt A1" period, appear to have been erected with the aim of "appropriating the surrounding territory".

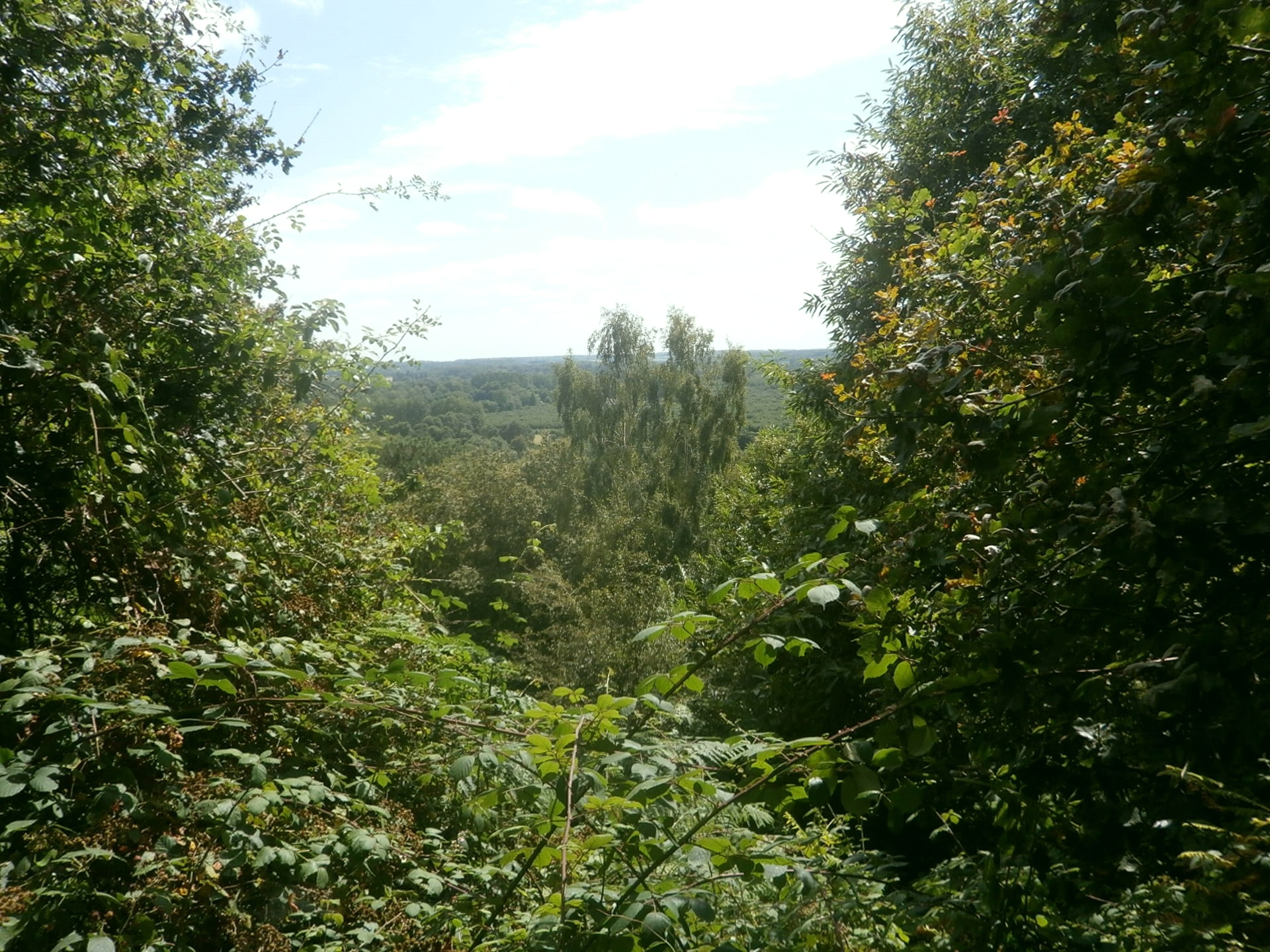
The Loir Valley seen from the Vaux camp

At 1,500 metres (4,900 ft) south-southwest of the place called Aubignanais, a promontory, the "Vaux camp," was occupied as early as the 7th century BCE; it overlooks the Loir. Its fortification phase is accompanied, to the northeast and in the valley, at the Cherré site, by the creation of a Bronze Age and Hallstatt necropolis. This necropolis, where weapons used in ritual deposits were found, was established at the crossroads of three Gallic territories: that of the Turones to the southeast, the Aulerci Cenomani to the north, and the Andecavi to the southwest, (Note: The Aulerci Cenomani settled around the 4th century BCE coming from Germania: Claude Lambert and Jean Rioufreyt (1983). "Les temps préhistoriques". In André Lévy (dir.) (ed.). La Sarthe [The Sarthe]. L'histoire par les documents (in French). Saint-Jean-d'Angely: Bordessoules. p. 40. ISBN 2-90350-410-5..) as did the Pictones and Turones (Note: The boundaries of the territories belonging to Gallic peoples and Gallo-Roman civitates, which are difficult to establish with precision, are generally estimated based on the diocesan boundaries established in the Middle Ages: Stephan Fichtl (2004). Les peuples gaulois, IIIe–Ier [The Gallic Peoples, 3rd–1st centuries] (in French). Paris: Errance. pp. 49–55. ISBN 2-87772-290-2..)

Even if it is less visible during the Iron Age due to the absence of architectural remains, the commercial role of the site within the valley is significant (Note: In this regard, the proximity of the Cherré site to the course of the Loir River, a trade route for goods and merchandise during the Iron Age, confirms the site's commercial status: several Gallic coins have been discovered on the outskirts of the Aubigné-Racan commune, along the Loir River, a tributary of the Sarthe.) and it intensified after the Roman conquest. (Note: Although not located within the same civitas (a sort of "city" that the Romans designated as a territory specific to Gallic and more generally Celtic tribes), H. Delétang notes and contextualizes numerous relationships between the oppidum of Neung-sur-Beuvron (civitas of the Biturii Cubi) and that of Cherré-Aubigné-Racan (civitas of the Cenomani).) By the end of this period, during La Tène "B2" and "C1", Cherré was fully part of the Cenomanian territory.

=== Antiquity ===
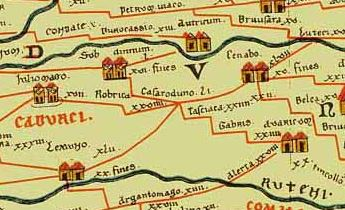
Excerpt from the Peutinger Table mentioning Fines (Vaas) between Subdinnum (Le Mans) and Casaroduno (Tours)

In Antiquity, the site became a vicus of Roman Gaul, located away from the main communication route linking Caesarodunum (Tours) to Vindunum (Le Mans) via Vaas (Note: The Tours–Le Mans road is mentioned on the Peutinger Table, which indicates a stop named Fines, which most historians and archaeologists identify with Vaas: Pierre Audin (1980). "La voie romaine de Tours au Mans jusqu'à Vaas-sur-le Loir (Sarthe)" [Bulletin of the Touraine Archaeological Society]. Bulletin de la Société archéologique de Touraine (in French). XXXIX: 373..) and from the one that, passing through Le Lude and Coulongé to the west, connects Le Mans to Poitiers. It was served at that time by several secondary roads or paths, likely inherited from the Protohistory, and the Loir River was navigable. The monumental decoration was established in the second half of the 1st century. Expansions and modifications were carried out less than a hundred years later on each of the studied monuments. At the beginning of the imperial period, apart from those at Cherré and Sainte-Gemmes-sur-Loire (a city belonging to the civitas of the Andecavi), few sites in western Gaul benefited from the establishment of such a complete monumental decoration. It was during this period, in the Flavian period, that the Aubigné-Racan place name experienced significant political and administrative development of an aedile type. Occupation continued intensively until the end of the 3rd century. (Note: In this regard, ceramics in the form of "type 606/607" drinking vessels were found in Aubigné-Racan.Guillier, Gérard (1997). "La production céramique du haut-empire de l'officine rurale de la Bosse (Sarthe)". Actes du Congrès du Mans [Proceedings of the Le Mans Congress] (PDF) (in French). Le Mans: S.F.E.C.A.G. p. 250..) These ceramic pieces, distributed across a vast region roughly covering the Sarthe territory, and whose production is attributed to the 2nd–3rd centuries CE, come from a significant pottery workshop located in the current commune of La Bosse. During this period, Cherré likely hosted seasonal commercial events as well as celebrations of the Roman imperial cult. The absence of organized roadways and remains of habitation rules out, a priori, permanent occupation.

Various factors may explain the abandonment of the site between the end of the 3rd century and the beginning of the 4th century: insecurity, the economic and political crisis, and the emergence of Christianity.

=== Middle Ages ===
In the Middle Ages, these places seem deserted, although a small necropolis, likely dating from the Merovingian or Carolingian period, consisting of 39 burials, occupies part of the site. These early medieval tombs were uncovered around the temple, in the form of earth burials or, more rarely, in schist coffins. Another necropolis, to the north of the site, reportedly yielded 34 sarcophagi made of sandstone, but it is known only through old mentions (1857 and 1939) and the results of an illegal excavation in 1975. An isolated burial, possibly from the same period, was uncovered near the baths. Cherré then regained, as in the protohistoric period, its cemetery function; a small Christian sanctuary may have been associated with it. (Note: One of the diplomas (or notarial deeds) drafted by the canonical chapter of Saint-Martin de Tours mentions, in the mid-9th century, the existence of one of the many real estate holdings of the chapter of Tours, in the form of a villa, located in the Sarthe parish: Hélène Noizet (2009). "Le centre canonial de Saint-Martin de Tours et ses domaines périphériques en Val de Loire". Annales de Bretagne et des Pays de l'Ouest [Annals of Brittany and the Western Countries] (in French). Vol. 109. Rennes: Presses universitaires de Rennes. pp. 4 and 5, note 21..) The gatherings that took place there shifted to Vaas, which was better served by the road network and experienced significant development during the Early Middle Ages. The materials from the ruined monuments were reused to construct surrounding buildings. The Romanesque churches of Saint-Martin-de-Vertou in Aubigné-Racan, Saint-Lubin de Coulongé, Saint-Martin de Sarcé, and Saint-Denis de Verneil-le-Chétif, as well as the former abbey church Notre-Dame de Vaas, thus preserve, in reuse, numerous large blocks or rubble stones from the Cherré temple, sometimes even retaining the original monument's decoration. The land was returned to agriculture until the 19th century; this limited the thickness of deposits related to human activity on the remains, which, during the first excavations of the 19th century, were almost at the surface.

Reuse of materials taken from the Cherré site

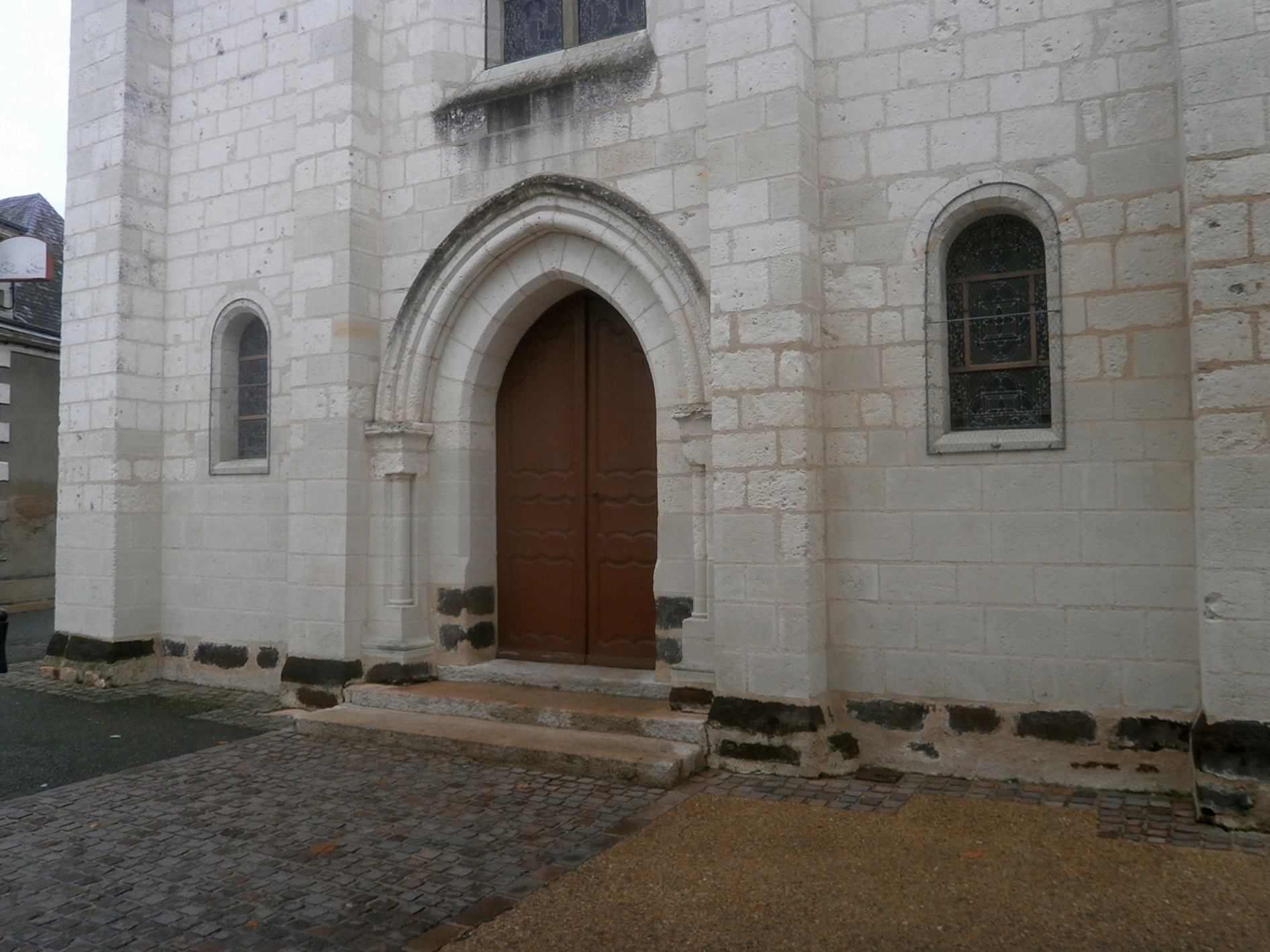
Church of Aubigné-Racan: large sandstone blocks in the nave's foundations

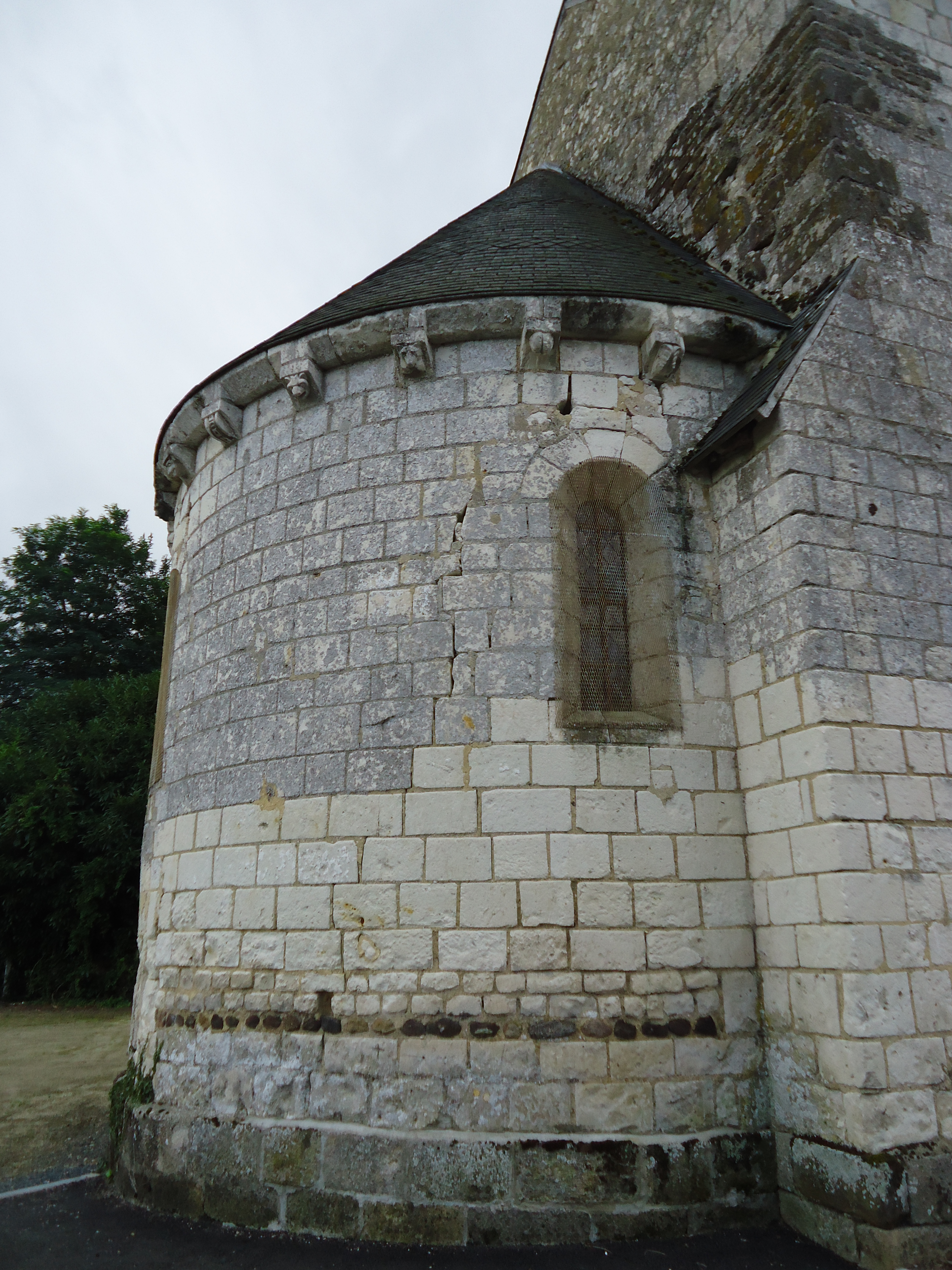
Church of Coulongé: small sandstone rubble in the apse's elevation

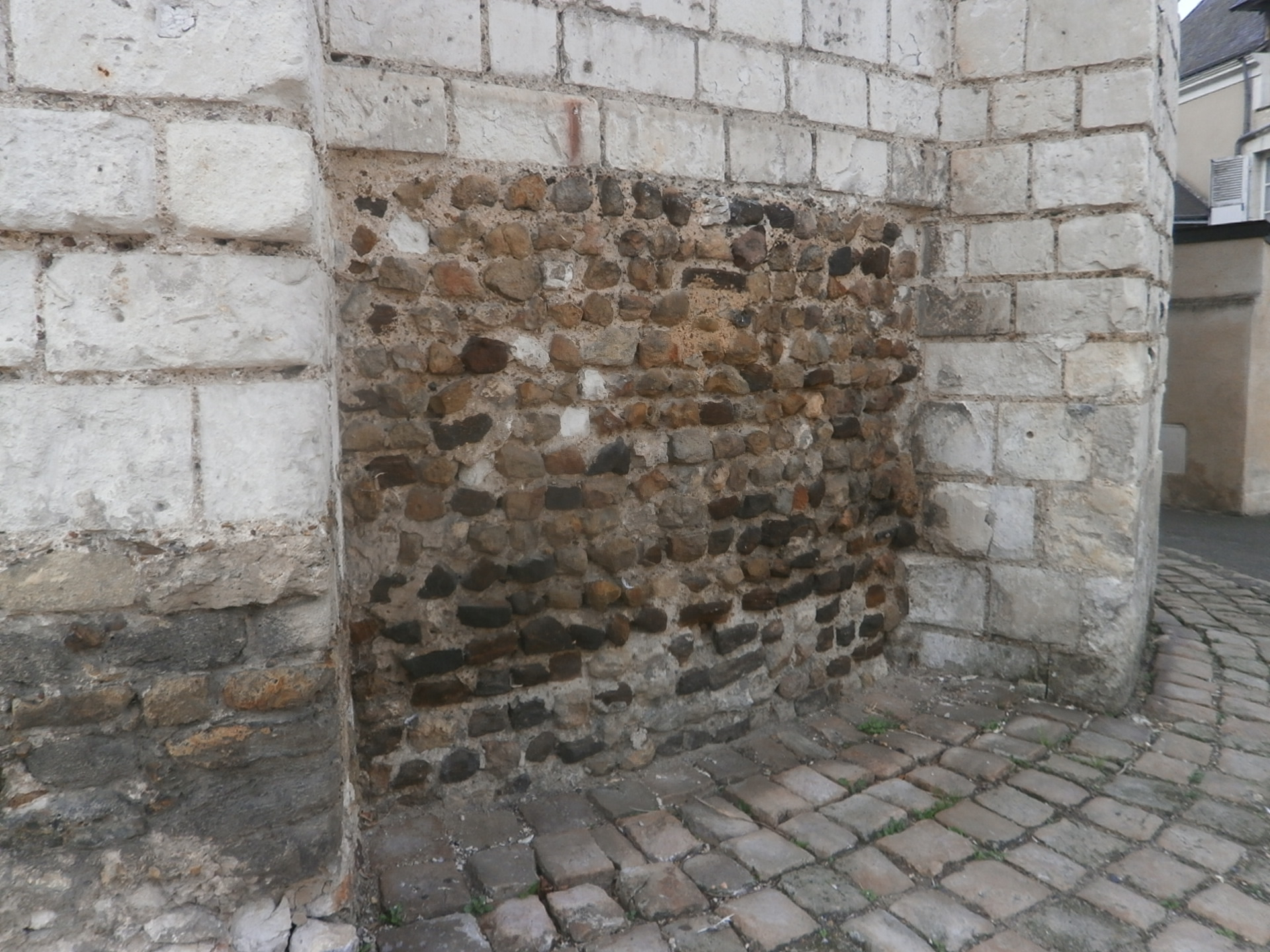
Church of Vaas: small sandstone rubble in the apse's foundations

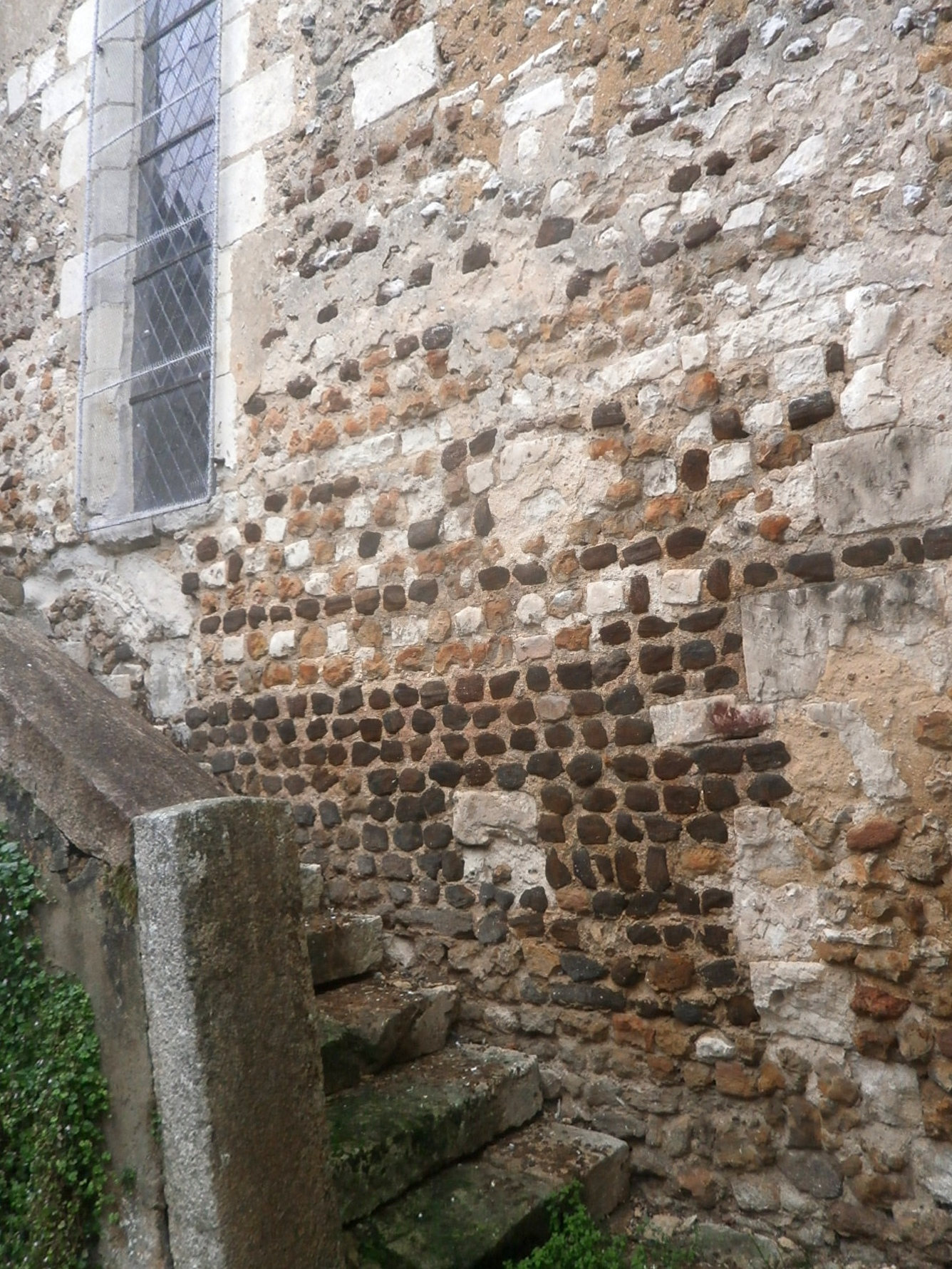
Church of Verneil-le-Chétif: small rubble in the nave's walls

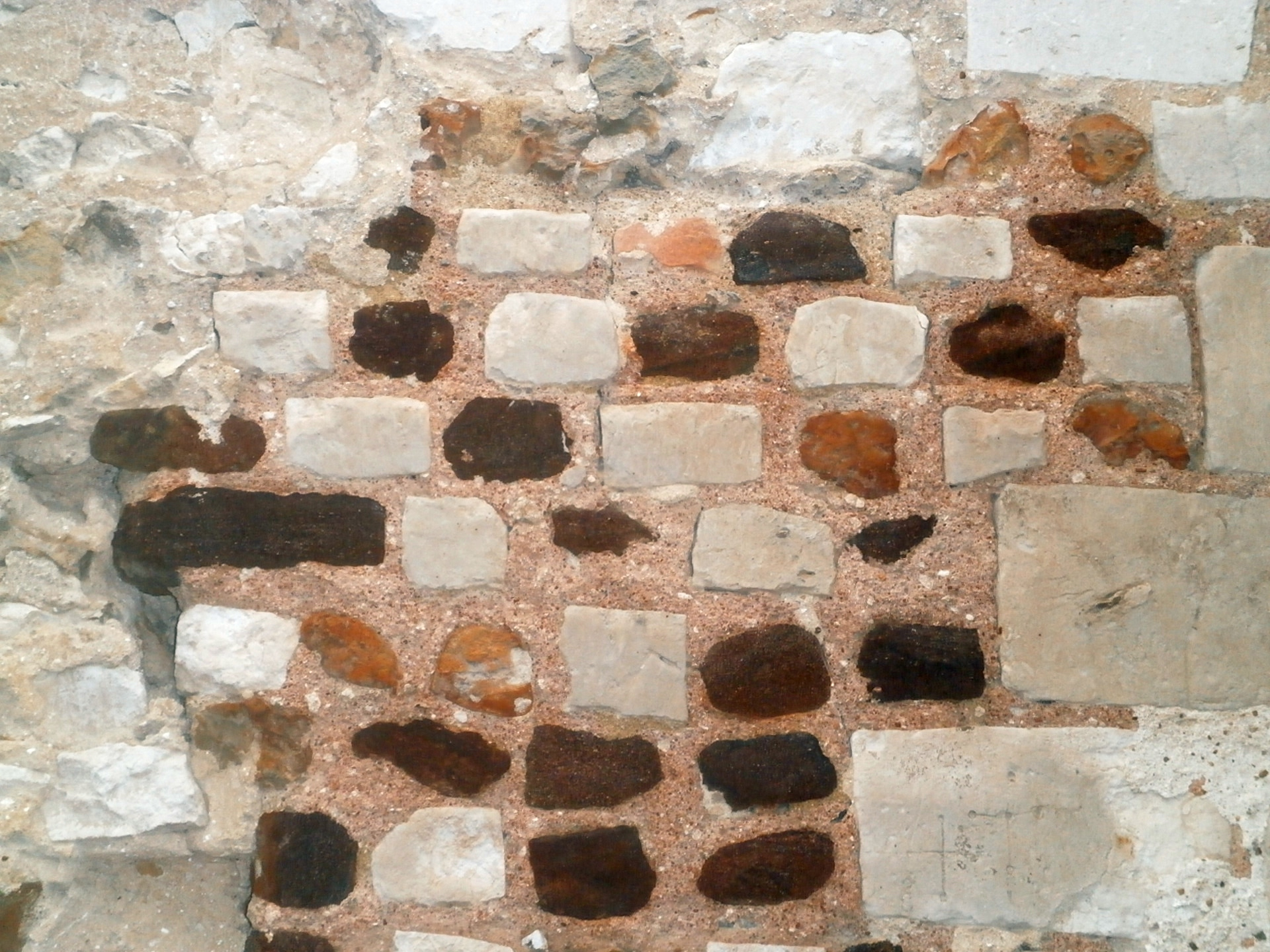
Church of Verneil-le-Chétif: detail of the geometric decoration

=== Rediscovery and first excavations ===
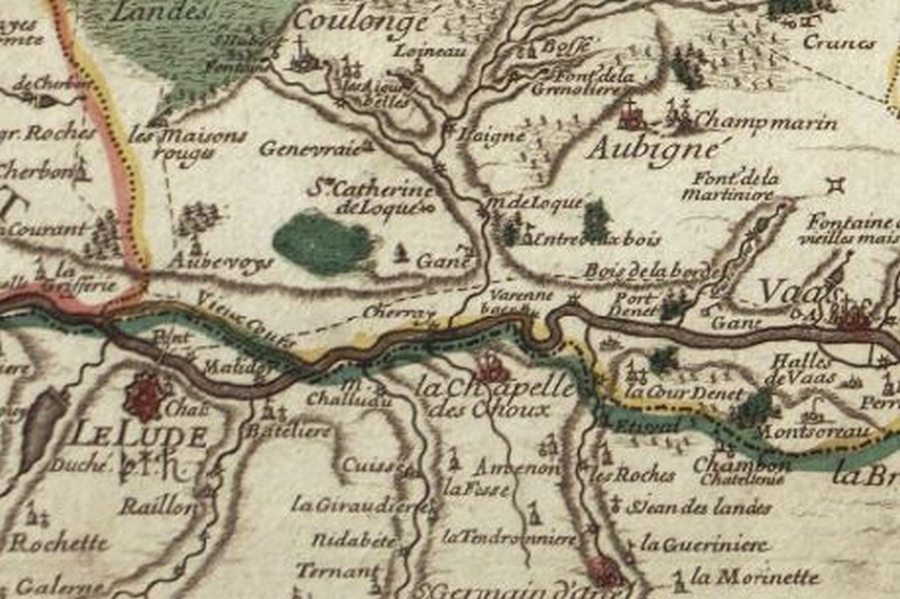
Excerpt from the map of Hubert Jaillot (1706)

A map of the diocese of Le Mans, drawn by Hubert Jaillot in 1706 and mentioned in a work published in 1829, refers to the ruins of a "[château de] Gane" that local tradition attributes to Ganelon, who betrayed Roland at Roncevaux. Although the description of the remains in 1829 corresponds well to that of an ancient theater, this hypothesis was not considered at the time: Julien Rémy Pesche, the author, refers to a castellum defending the entrance to a Roman camp. In 1857, in the same area, coins and objects were unearthed, as well as a section of an aqueduct that was not identified as such. In the 19th century, the surroundings of the theater were significantly disrupted by the removal of materials for road or railway embankment purposes.

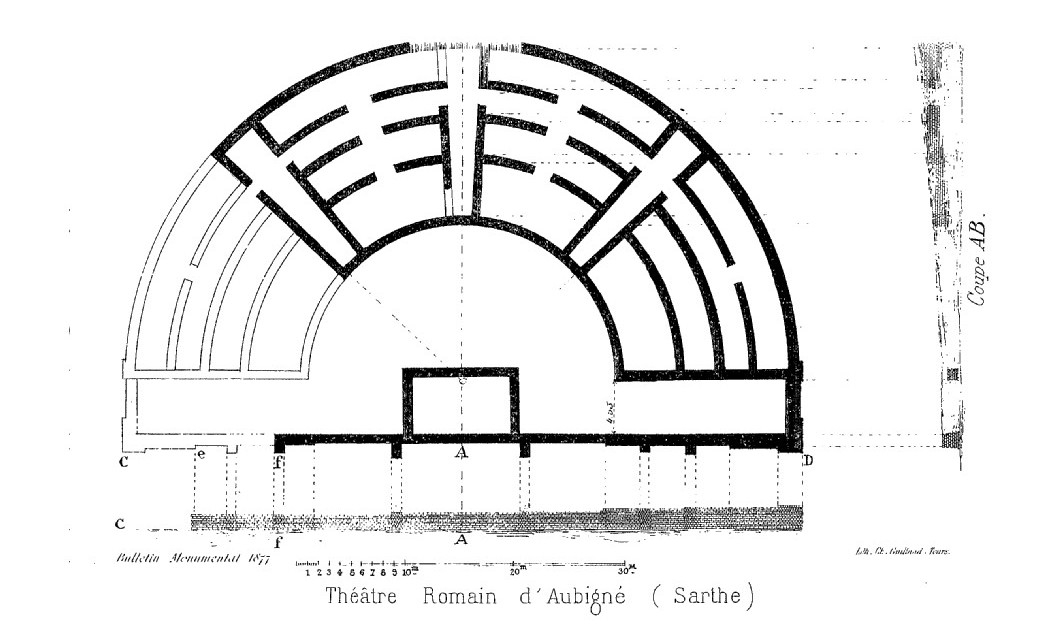
Plan of the theater (1877)

Gustave de Cougny, president of the French Archaeological Society, was the first to recognize the ruins of the Château de Gane as those of an ancient theater. He organized the first excavations in 1875, conducted by the Viscountess of Quatrebarbes, residing in Vaas, which led to the publication in 1877 of an incomplete but fairly accurate plan in the parts it depicts. In 1896, the historian François Joseph Liger published a study of the Cherré site, expanded in a more comprehensive work in 1903; it already mentions the structures known in the 21st century: the temple, the baths, and a building west of the theater (market-forum). Liger's excavations were quickly halted at the request of the landowner, who was convinced that a treasure was being sought, and the historian's conclusions, for much of the site including the market-forum, temple, and baths, rely only on a few surveys and extrapolations. This publication was criticized upon its release, and its author was discredited. After World War I, the theater's substructures were used to support a lime kiln., causing the destruction of the southern part of the cavea.

=== Studies and enhancement ===
Published in two parts, in 1965 and 1966, a study largely rehabilitates Liger's publication, but it is still based only on bibliographic compilations supplemented by partial and superficial field observations, and no organized excavations were undertaken. Between 1972 and 1976, several excavations and surveys, some clandestine, were carried out. Cherré became a classified natural site on 20, a status that provides better protection against illegal interventions. Aerial prospections began in 1972, and state-led excavations, under the direction of Claude Lambert and Jean Rioufreyt, started in May 1976 at the theater site. (Note: The first aerial archaeology photograph of this Gallo-Roman monument dedicated to performances, with the assistance of archaeologists Claude Lambert and Jean Rioufreyt, was taken in the early 1980s using a hot air balloon: Jacques Dubois; Charles Leva (1999). "Archéologie aérienne en Touraine (France)". Actes du colloque international d'archéologie aérienne Amiens, 15 - 18 octobre 1992: Hommage à Roger Agache pour 35 ans de prospections aériennes dans le Nord de la France [Proceedings of the International Aerial Archaeology Conference Amiens, 15–18 October 1992: Tribute to Roger Agache for 35 Years of Aerial Prospections in Northern France]. Revue Archéologique de Picardie. Numéro Spécial (in French). Vol. spécial issue 17. Revue Archéologique de Picardie. p. 363. doi:10.3406/pica.1999.2123..) Multi-year projects were initiated, focusing on the theater from 1977 to 1981, the market-forum from 1982 to 1985, the large temple from 1986 to 1988 and then in 2006, and the baths from 1989 to 1991. Several other buildings, including a second temple and a large galleried structure near the large temple, were identified but have not been studied. In 1995, additional financial resources were allocated for the preservation and enhancement of the site, while the commune of Aubigné-Racan had purchased Cherré from private owners about fifteen years earlier. The restoration of the site's remains began in 1998 under the responsibility of the Departmental Architecture and Heritage Service.

In 2006, the Sarthe Departmental Council, owner of the site since 2002, and the Centre allonnais de prospection et de recherches archéologiques (CAPRA) implemented a project to enhance the remains. A visitor reception building was constructed, an accessible path for people with reduced mobility was created, and explanatory panels were installed on the site. Guided tours and educational workshops on the themes of Gallo-Roman civilization and the archaeologist's profession are offered. Additionally, consolidation and maintenance work on the remains and their surroundings is organized during the summer period. In the early 2010s, Yvan Maligorne estimated that, among all the ancient urban complexes identified in western Gaul, only Cherré and the Allonnes archaeological site have benefited from significant research and systematic excavation programs.

Beyond its archaeological significance, Cherré is located in an area remarkable for its natural heritage: a sensitive natural area of the "meadows of the Gallo-Roman camp" and a Natura 2000 network site of the "Loir Valley from Vaas to Bazouges".

Chronology of the Cherré site

== Funerary and warrior cult site ==
=== Necropolis and enclosures ===
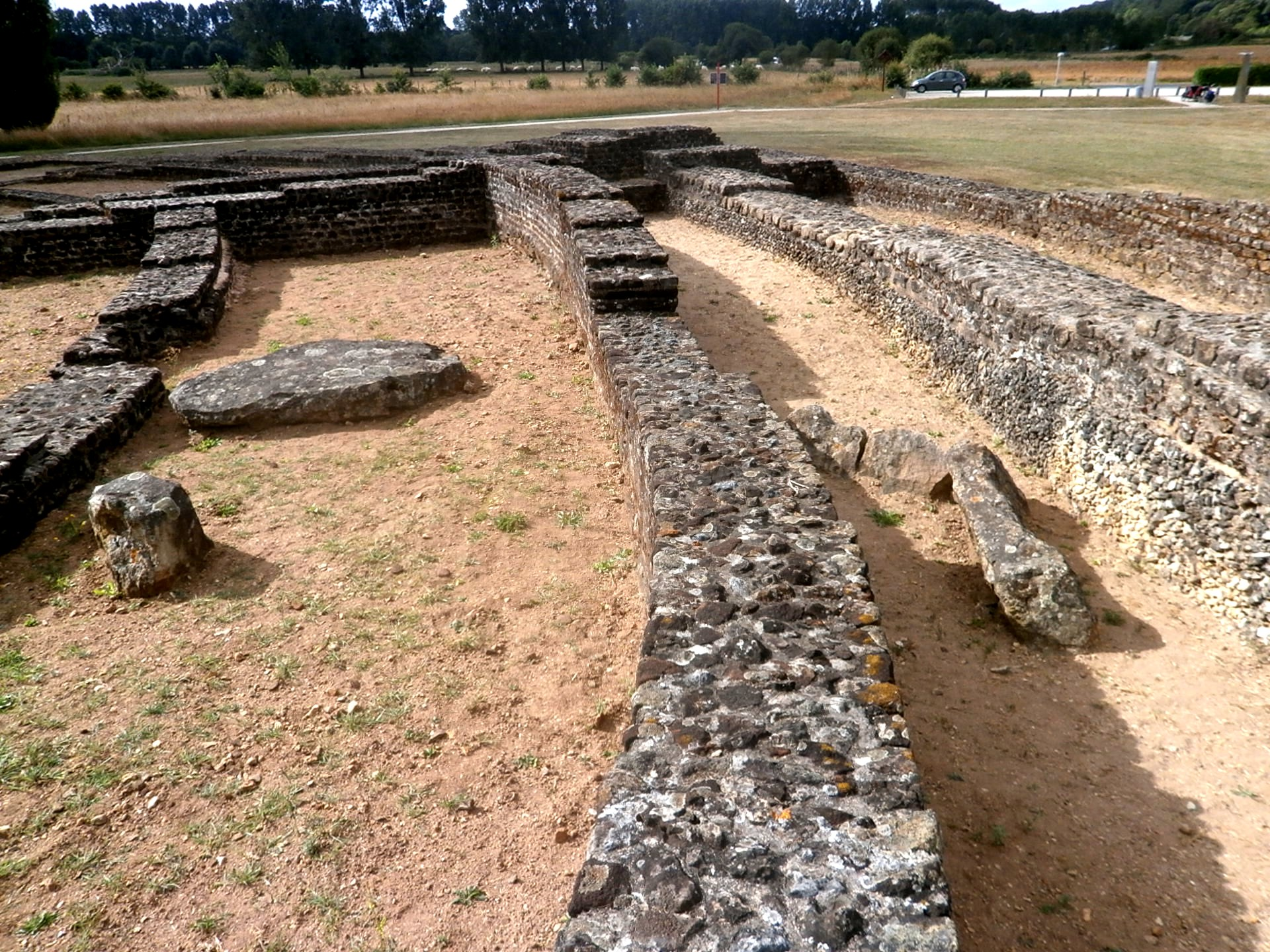
Partial view of the Hallstatt necropolis (megaliths of the theater)

The discovery, initially under the theater, of a Hallstatt necropolis (5th century BCE) shows that the site was occupied very early. At the level of the theater's foundations, at least eight tumuli were found, some containing earth burials, and one containing a funerary urn as well as five megaliths lying flat, the largest of which was recut to allow the construction of the theater; this ensemble can be dated to the late Hallstatt (HA D3) or the beginning of the La Tène period ("La Tène A"). The majority of the burials constituting the protohistoric cemetery, whether under tumuli or not, are individual. The Hallstatt-La Tène tombs at Cherré are characterized by a funerary process of incineration. The uncovering of these burials, although partial, has allowed the reconstruction of funerary goods, which, according to archaeologists, are rare or even exceptional in western Gaul. Some of the excavated tombs notably yielded glass beads among the various artifacts accompanying the deceased's ashes.

Protohistoric remains identified at Cherré: D: weapons deposit; E: enclosure; S: burial

This necropolis extends beyond the theater's footprint to beneath the western galleries of the market-forum; other protohistoric burials are also located further south, under the northern part of the peribole of the large temple. Cherré represents one of the rare known examples, based on available data, of a collective cultic ensemble in western France for the Iron Age. The large ancient temple itself appears to have replaced an earlier indigenous cultic structure, made of wood, where weapons may initially have been displayed before being sacrificed and deposited in the nearby marsh.

The foundation of this funerary complex is likely linked to the presence of the nearby Vaux promontory camp, (Note: This structure, in the form of a promontory, is a habitation site attributed to the "late Hallstatt (D)" period. Excavations of this domestic site have yielded numerous artifacts, primarily rudimentary ceramics with so-called "corded" motifs, sometimes twisted, and, in smaller quantities, more refined glossy ceramics with fluted or incised decorations. Archaeologists also uncovered a significant quantity of lithic objects, including scrapers, cores, and polished axes. Finally, within the same site, deposits from the Bronze Age were identified, such as the lower parts (heels) of javelins: Gérard Cordier (1985). "Les habitats Hallstattiens de Chinon (Indre-et-Loire)" [Hallstatt Settlements of Chinon (Indre-et-Loire)]. Gallia (in French). tome 43 (fascicule 1): 17. doi:10.3406/galia.1985.2819..) dated to the Late Bronze Age and Hallstatt. The association of a fortified protohistoric settlement on high ground with its necropolis in the valley, at some distance, is common. The establishment of the ancient site at this precise location was very likely deliberate, with the installation of its structures seemingly indicating a desire to perpetuate its use and cultic function.

Surveys conducted 70 m north of the theater revealed traces of concentric ditches delimiting an enclosure, possibly contemporary with the necropolis. The enclosure is oval, measuring 61 m in its largest dimension, with an entrance to the south. Several other enclosures have been fully or partially identified on the Cherré site or in its immediate surroundings: a circular structure at least 20 m in diameter south of the theater, near the D 305; a large trapezoidal enclosure with double ditches southeast of the temple; and an elongated structure, of which only one corner was uncovered southwest of the temple. These structures are likely related to the presence of the burials and the ritual deposit, even though they cannot be dated in the absence of artifacts.

=== Weapons deposit ===
The Cherré site confirms, from the early La Tène period, its status as a place of worship with a warrior character. Ritual deposits, in the form of religious offerings, attributed to this period, have been discovered. This type of deposit is notably characterized by the presence of animal bone remains (generally skulls), mixed with ceramic sherds and weapons, some in their complete state, others found fragmented. The weapons constitute a deposit of 73 pieces, all made of metal. In addition to swords and scabbards, the excavation of this deposit also revealed handles and fragments of cauldrons. The entire deposit is attributed to a period ranging from La Tène B2 to D. The taxonomic analysis of this ritual deposit of animal bones has allowed its composition to be estimated: it consists of bones from livestock, primarily suids and bovids. This type of ritual, manifested through sacrifice and associated with strong religious symbolism, is attested throughout the ecoregion of Armorican.

Similar to the excavation area of Allonnes, located a few dozen kilometers from Aubigné-Racan, sword scabbards with incised and curved ornaments, some evoking mythological animals, were uncovered during archaeological investigations. This type of motif is characteristic of the middle and final La Tène periods. Surveys of this cultic deposit yielded 4 axes ("currency-bars") including one socketed axe. Accompanied by lances and shield bosses (Note: All these warrior-related items were unearthed in the former marshy area of Aubigné-Racan, near the temple.) their length was estimated to be between 50 and 60 cm. A significant production of semi-finished domestic metal objects, such as cauldron handles and grips, was also unearthed. Others, less numerous, generally fully manufactured vessels, were also recovered. The entire deposit, like that of Allonnes, was located within a sand-based earthwork.

At the same location, between the D 305 and the large temple, other weapons deposits were found. At the time of their discovery, they were accompanied by tableware and animal skulls, all placed at the bottom of the former marsh. They are characteristic of the rituals of the 3rd century BCE. However, these deposits, attributed to the end of La Tène B2 and early La Tène C1, and mostly consisting of warrior-related offerings, appear to have been used for a relatively short period. These same deposits, upon excavation, were scattered in the soils in non-stratified layers.

== Predominantly religious agglomeration ==
=== Monumental complex ===
==== Theater ====
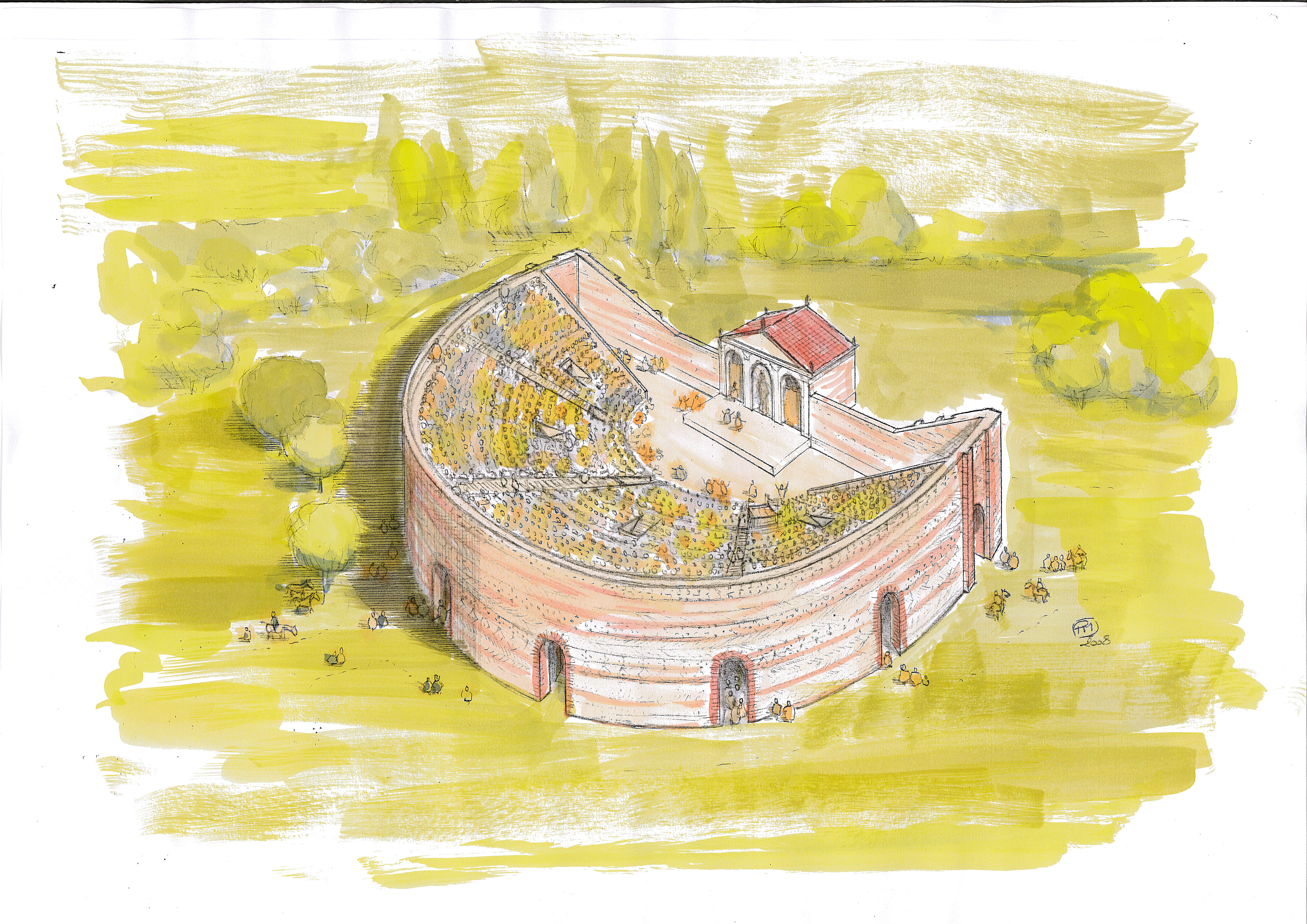
Proposed reconstruction of the remodeled theater. Drawing by Pascal Mariette.

Plan of the theater third quarter of the 1st century second quarter of the 2nd century

The theater was probably constructed toward the end of the 1st century and remodeled in the second quarter of the 2nd century. Tiles, possibly from the roofing of the stage building, were fired between 45 and 75 CE. The coins found on the site seem to indicate use centered around the 2nd and 3rd centuries. (Note: H. Delétang, in an analysis of the architecture of the Neung-sur-Beuvron ancient theater, notes that the Cherré theater, whose foundations are not supported by a hill or nestled against a valley slope but are located in the heart of a plain, would have been a monument "built from scratch". In his study, the historian identified, in addition to this comparative element, several architectural features common to both theaters.) The most recent coins, more numerous, mark the end of the theater's use.

It is a semicircular structure with a diameter of approximately 63 m. The approximately 3,000 spectators (estimated capacity of the theater in its second phase) were seated on wooden bleachers forming the cavea — numerous nails attesting to the extensive use of wood were found, as well as recesses in the masonry designed to accommodate beams — supported by concentric masonry arches, (Note: The same construction principle, wooden structures resting on masonry foundations, was used for other performance venues such as the Pula Arena: Jean-Claude Golvin (2012). L'amphithéâtre romain et les jeux du cirque dans le monde antique [The Roman Amphitheater and Circus Games in the Ancient World] (in French). Archéologie Nouvelle. p. 57. ISBN 978-2-95339-735-2.) but its foundations are limited. (Note: Henri Delétang emphasizes that the cavea of the Cherré ancient theater, including its foundations and substructures, benefited from a completely artificial construction type. Furthermore, he notes that the cavea is supported by concentric walls. These architectural elements allow for better distribution of "thrusts" and "openings" and facilitate internal circulation.) A timber gallery at the level of the curved wall may have provided access to the vomitoria. The height of the external wall of the cavea, when studies began in the 1970s, was still locally 2 m, but the highest bleachers likely reached over 12 m. Access to the cavea was via three main radial vomitoria (Vp) supplemented by four secondary ones (Vs). The balteus separating the orchestra from the cavea measures only one meter in height at most. A small stage building measuring 10.60 by 5.20 metres is located at the center of the straight wall closing the theater, positioned externally on this wall (S1). This wall is 63 m long, and in the central part of its inner face, at the stage level, three niches, possibly decorative, are arranged.

The masonry consists of a facing of roussard sandstone rubble and, more rarely, bricks, some of which bear finger marks and notches on their sides, enclosing an aggregate of sandstone and flint nodules bound with mortar. White sandstone rubble forms decorative patterns on the curved wall of the cavea and the stage wall on both faces, as well as on the inner walls of the main vomitoria. The curved wall of the cavea features, at its base and on both faces, several projections designed both to reinforce its structure and contribute to its decoration. In its initial configuration, the Cherré theater appears to have been built based on a square of 36 Roman feet, with the main dimensions of the monument, its cavea, or its orchestra being multiples of the side or diagonal of this square.

During the remodeling of the theater in the 2nd century, new semi-annular walls supporting the bleachers were constructed; they are faced with small rubble stones of a lighter sandstone than that previously used. Two of them are inserted between the structures of the first phase. Two others, encroaching on the former orchestra, reduce its size. They also include a lodge (L) at the exit of one of the vomitoria, likely intended to accommodate an elite figure, perhaps the benefactor who funded the works; this structure may also be the foundation of a small cultic building. The stage building, with its reduced dimensions, appears to have been moved inside the orchestra and includes two internal partition walls (S2). The maximum dimensions of the monument remain unaffected, with the external curved wall of the cavea attributed to the first construction phase of the theater.

The Cherré theater falls into the category of Gallo-Roman theaters. This type of performance monument is characterized by its small stage building, often lightweight structure, the use of small masonry, construction centered around the end of the 1st century and the middle of the 2nd century, and frequent association with a sanctuary. It is not possible to determine what performances took place in the Cherré theater: games, theatrical performances, or cultic ceremonies. The same question applies to other similar performance monuments in Gaul.

The positioning of the theater within the Cherré complex may seem surprising. It is built on a plain, although it could have been backed against nearby hills to limit the masonry structures of the monument. Its stage wall is not aligned with one of the walls of the temple's peribole, as is often the case when these two structures are associated on a plain; this singularity may reflect a deliberate intent to build the theater above the tumuli and megaliths. At Cherré, the main monuments other than the theater (large temple, market-forum, and baths) follow the same orientation and alignment.

Cherré theater

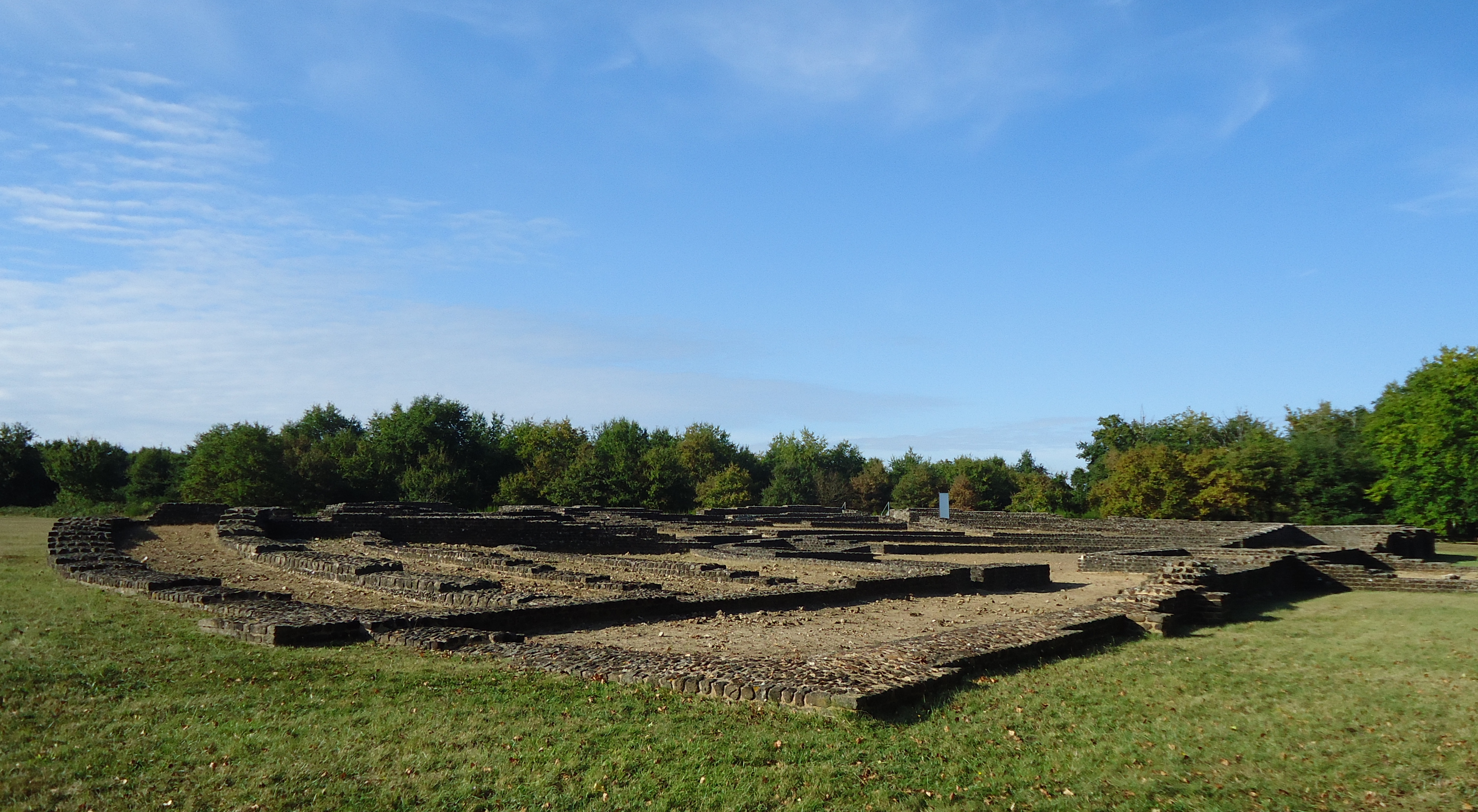
General view of the remains

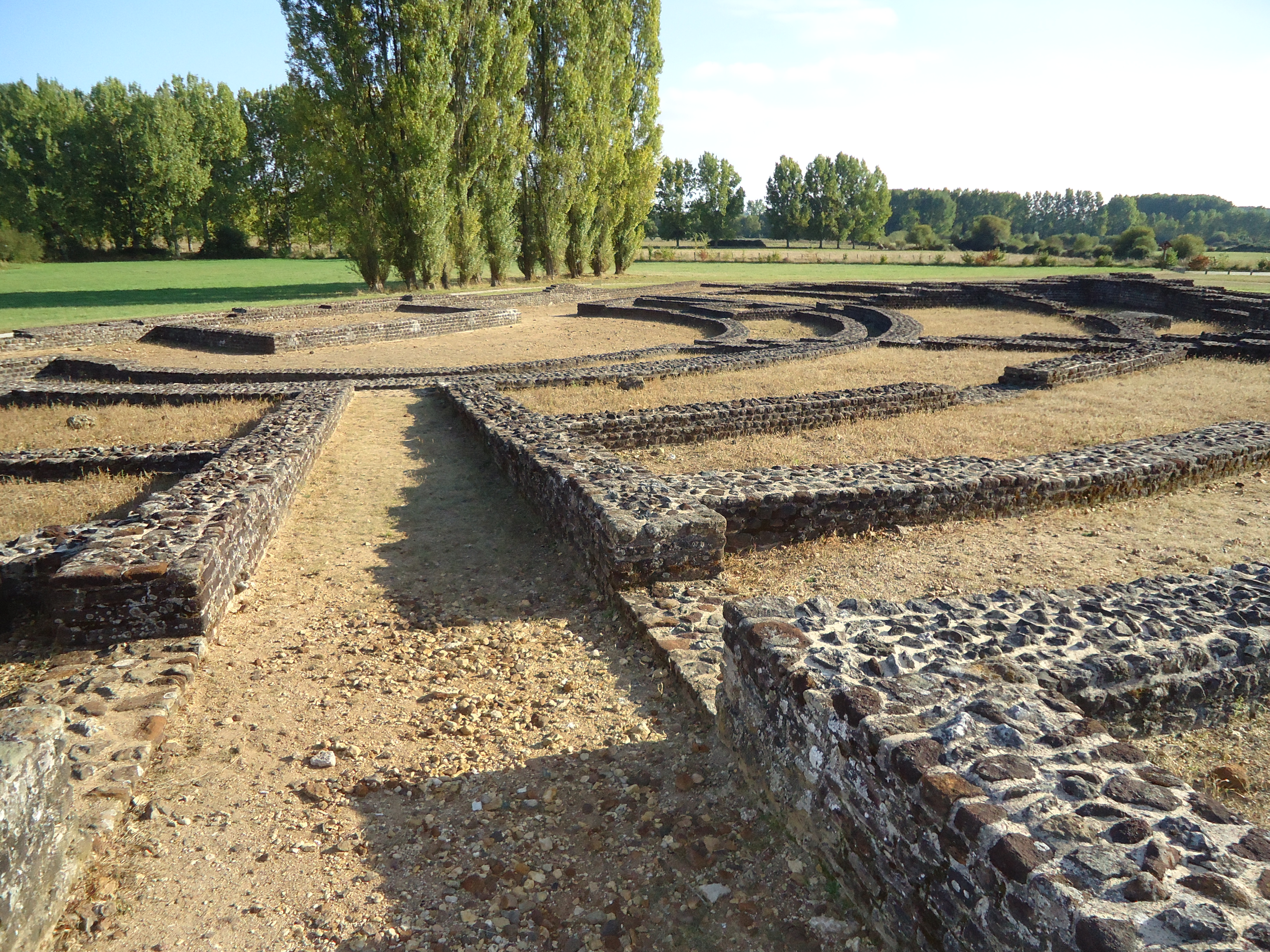
Cavea viewed toward the stage

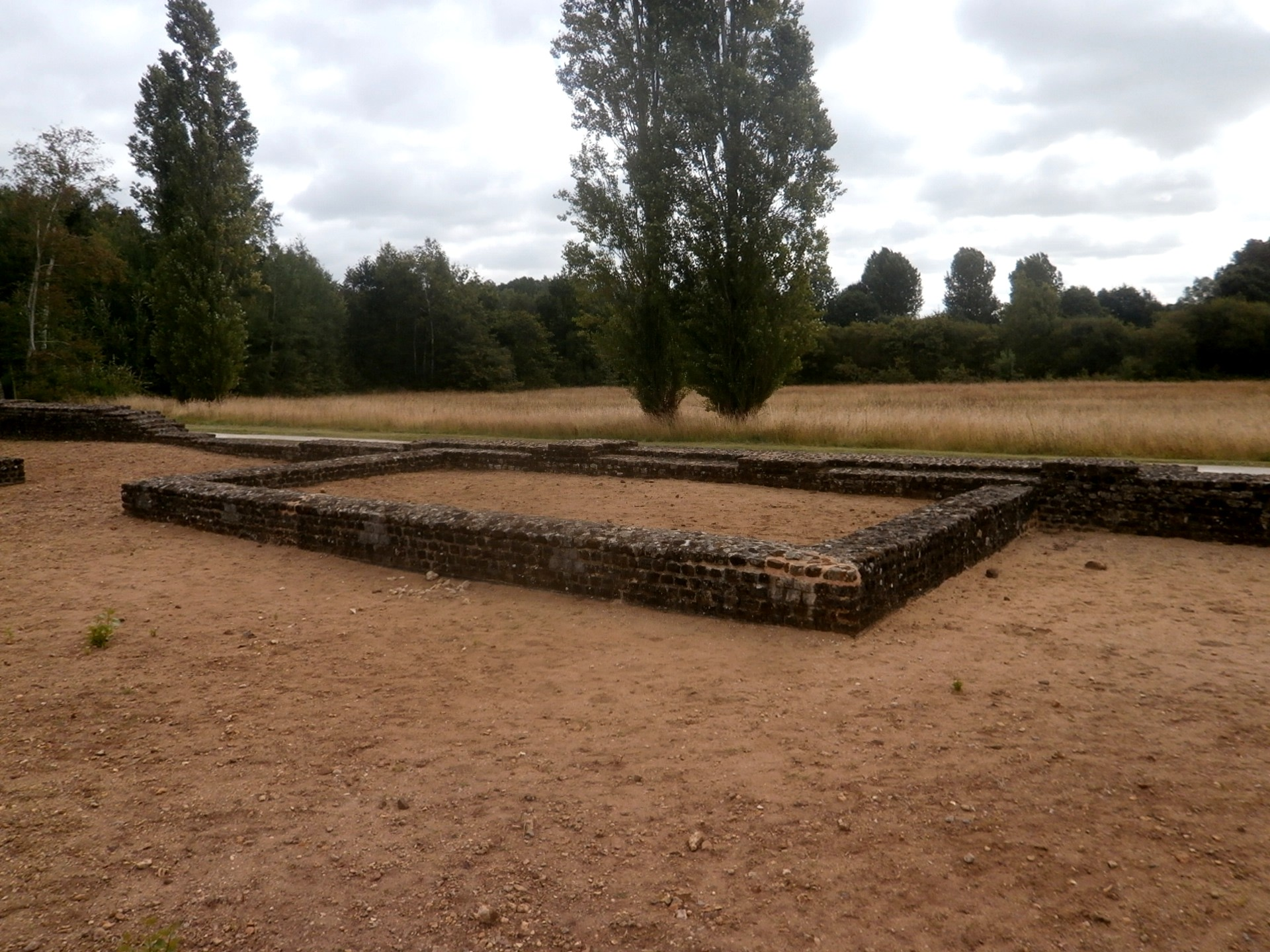
Stage

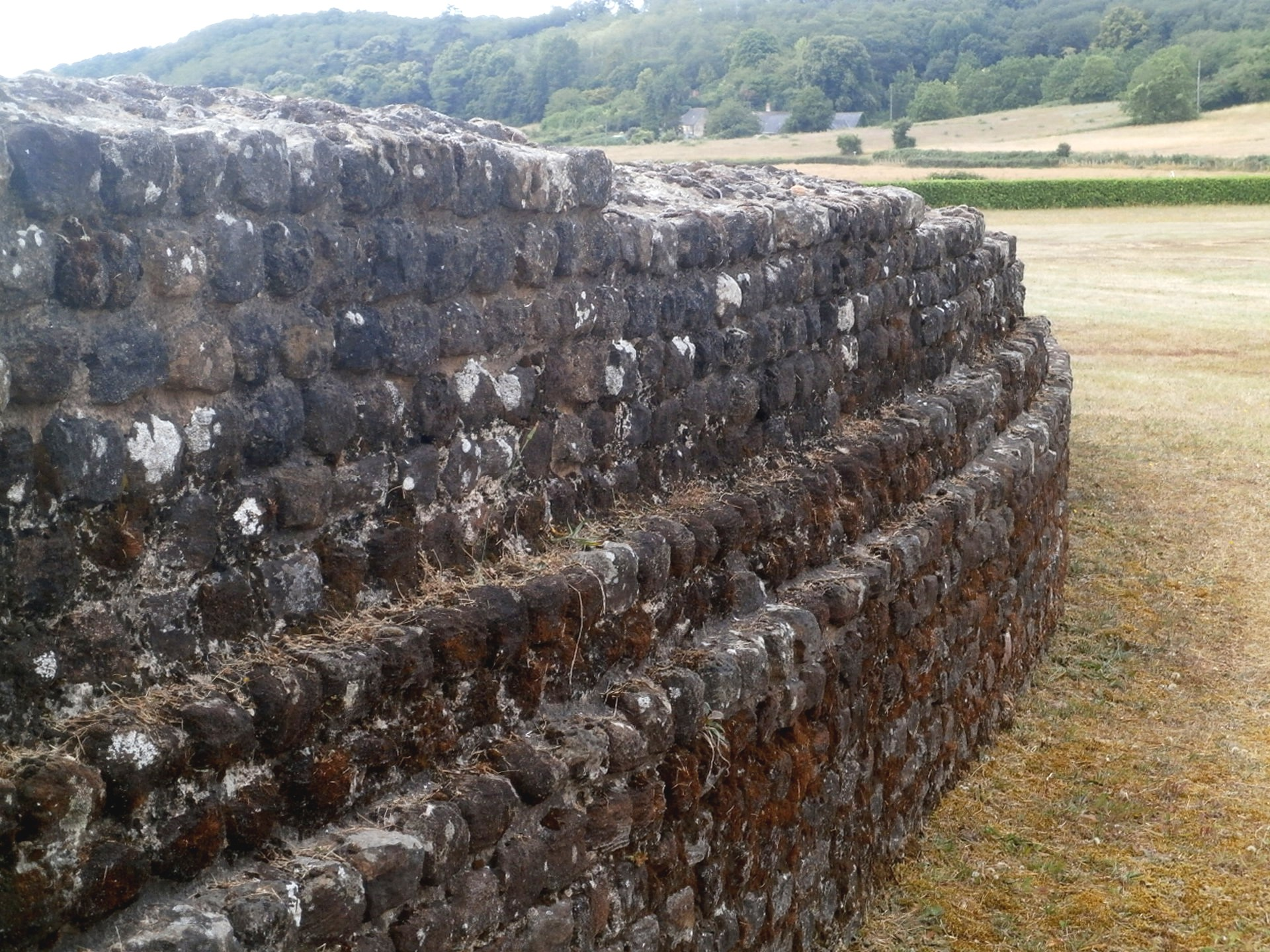
Detail of the outer wall

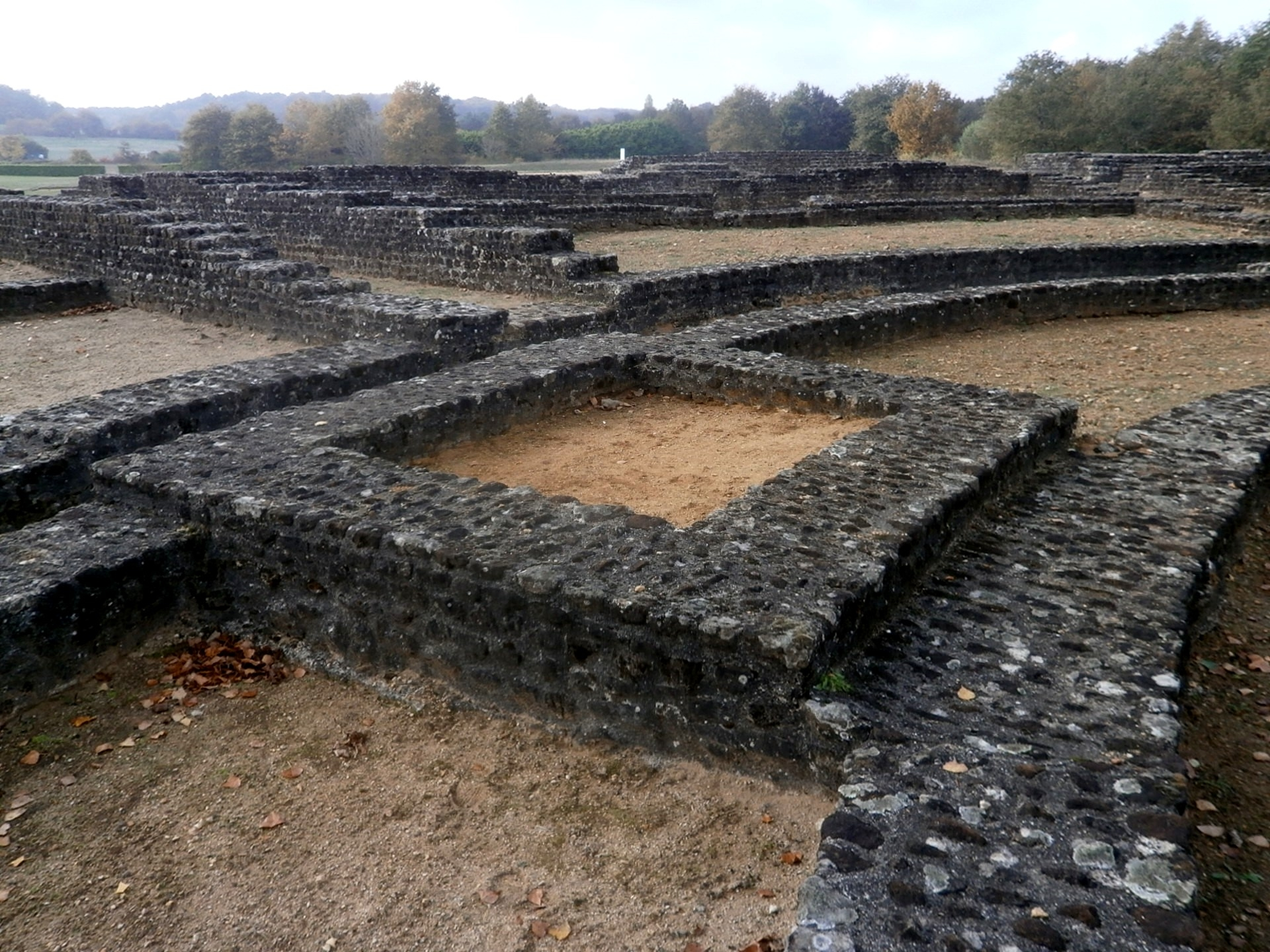
"Honorary lodge"

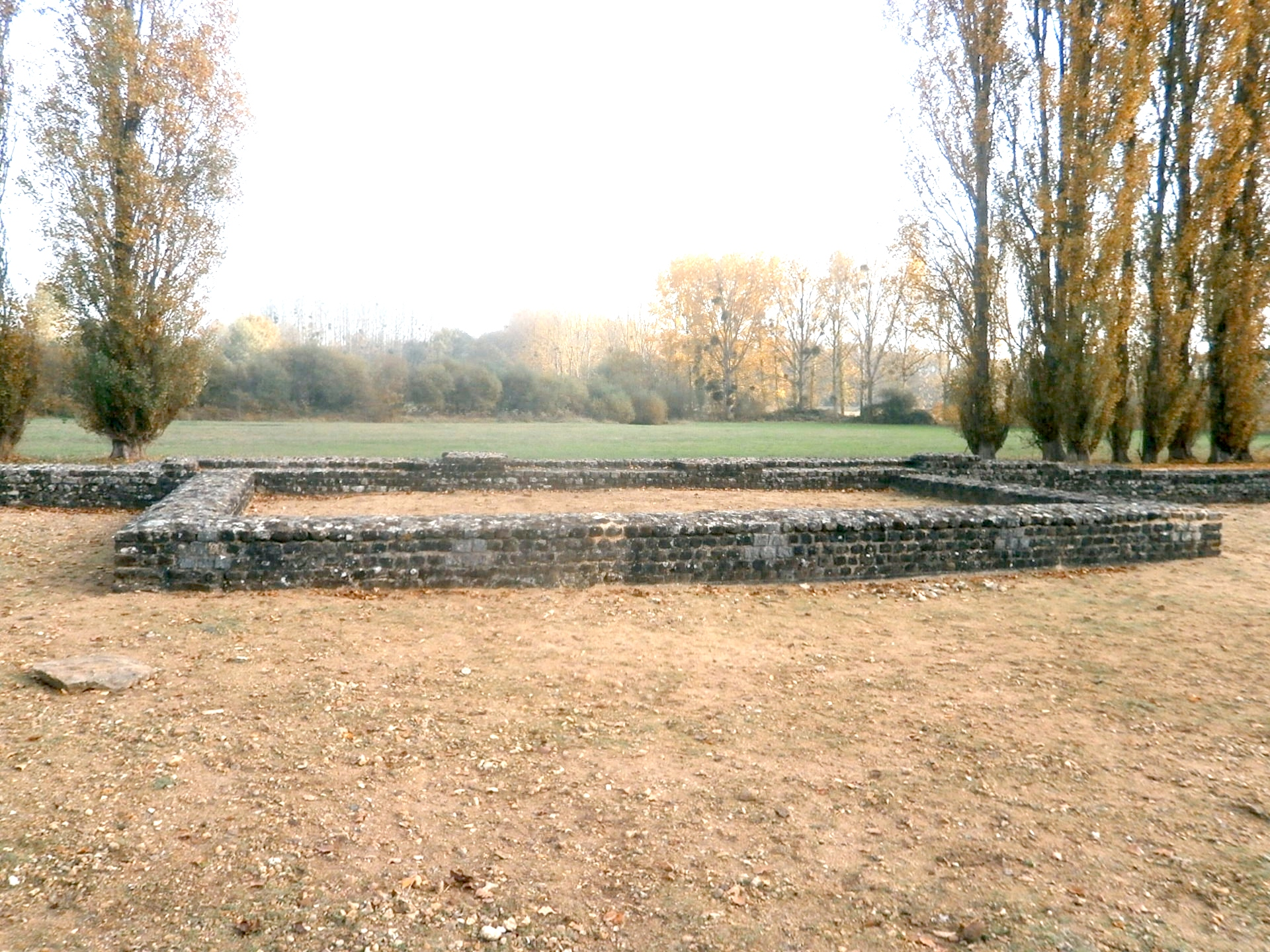
Stage wall decoration (5 triangles of light sandstone rubble)

==== Market-forum ====
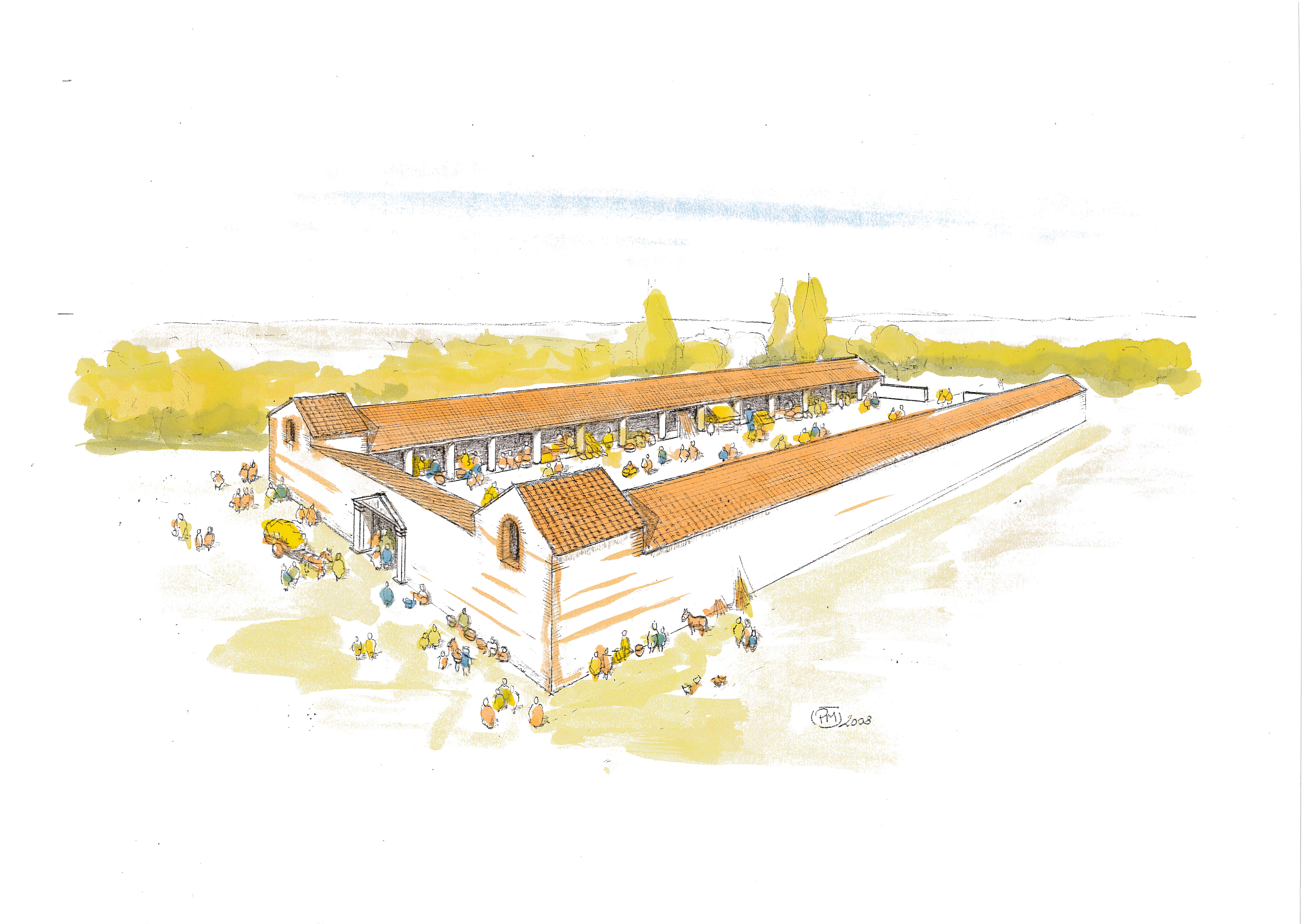
Proposed reconstruction of the market-forum after its expansion. Drawing by Pascal Mariette.

Plan of the market-forum third quarter of the 1st century second quarter of the 2nd century

This building, constructed west of the theater toward the end of the 1st century and expanded about fifty years later, appears to have been frequented, like the theater, from the end of the 1st century to the end of the 3rd century, as evidenced by the minting dates of the numerous Roman coins found on-site. It suffered a fire before or after its expansion.

In its initial configuration, it was a large tiled covered hall flanked at one end of each long side by a small square room (P); these rooms were possibly used as registration or payment offices. After renovations that reused the structures of the first phase, this forum became an open courtyard (Co) in the shape of a parallelogram measuring 68 by 42 metres (223 by 138 ft) on its long sides, with two double covered galleries (G) opening onto it, 3.40 metres (11.2 ft) wide. The galleries open onto the courtyard via a colonnade. The thinness of some walls suggests they served only as masonry foundations for wooden elevations, which in turn supported a tiled roof.

The site yielded approximately 24,000 fragments of butchered animal bones, as well as around 15,000 oysters (indifferently upper or lower valves or complete shells), but also toiletries, tools, statuettes, sherds of sigillata ceramics, (Note: Some of these fragments come from so-called "smooth" ceramics, others from "molded" ceramics. One notable piece found in the forum features a frieze composed of a human figure, a dog, a lion, and a bird, each separated by plant or rosette motifs.) and no fewer than 540 coins. These objects are found across the entire surface of the building, with a higher concentration in the western galleries. Zooarchaeological studies conducted on the mammalian remains revealed that this faunal assemblage is primarily composed of bones from bovids (numbering 6,697), and to a lesser extent from caprines and pigs (respectively 1,155 and 1,083). The beef pieces, unlike those from caprines and pigs, were subject to selection. The slaughtering and butchering of animals likely took place on-site, between the theater and the forum, where the pieces were then cut for sale. In this regard, Sébastien Lepetz emphasizes that the Cherré forum is a typical example of an association between a Gallo-Roman market and butchery. The existence, in the galleries, of merchants' stalls selling products consumed off-site is suggested. Other commercial activities may have taken place within this building, but it is difficult to specify which ones. A fountain (F), supplied by a wooden pipeline bound with iron hoops, was located at the center of the hall in the initial configuration of the forum.

The status and role of this building are still under discussion. It was initially identified as a macellum (market). However, several authors believe it likely played a much broader and more significant role, and recent interpretations consider it a meeting place comparable, in some respects, to a forum where commercial transactions also took place. This type of "market-forum" is attested in Germania, Brittany, and Belgic Gaul. However, according to Yvan Maligorne, the purpose of the Cherré building is neither political nor administrative: the Gallo-Roman structure is not a forum in the strict sense and serves solely as a place for economic exchanges.

Cherré market-forum

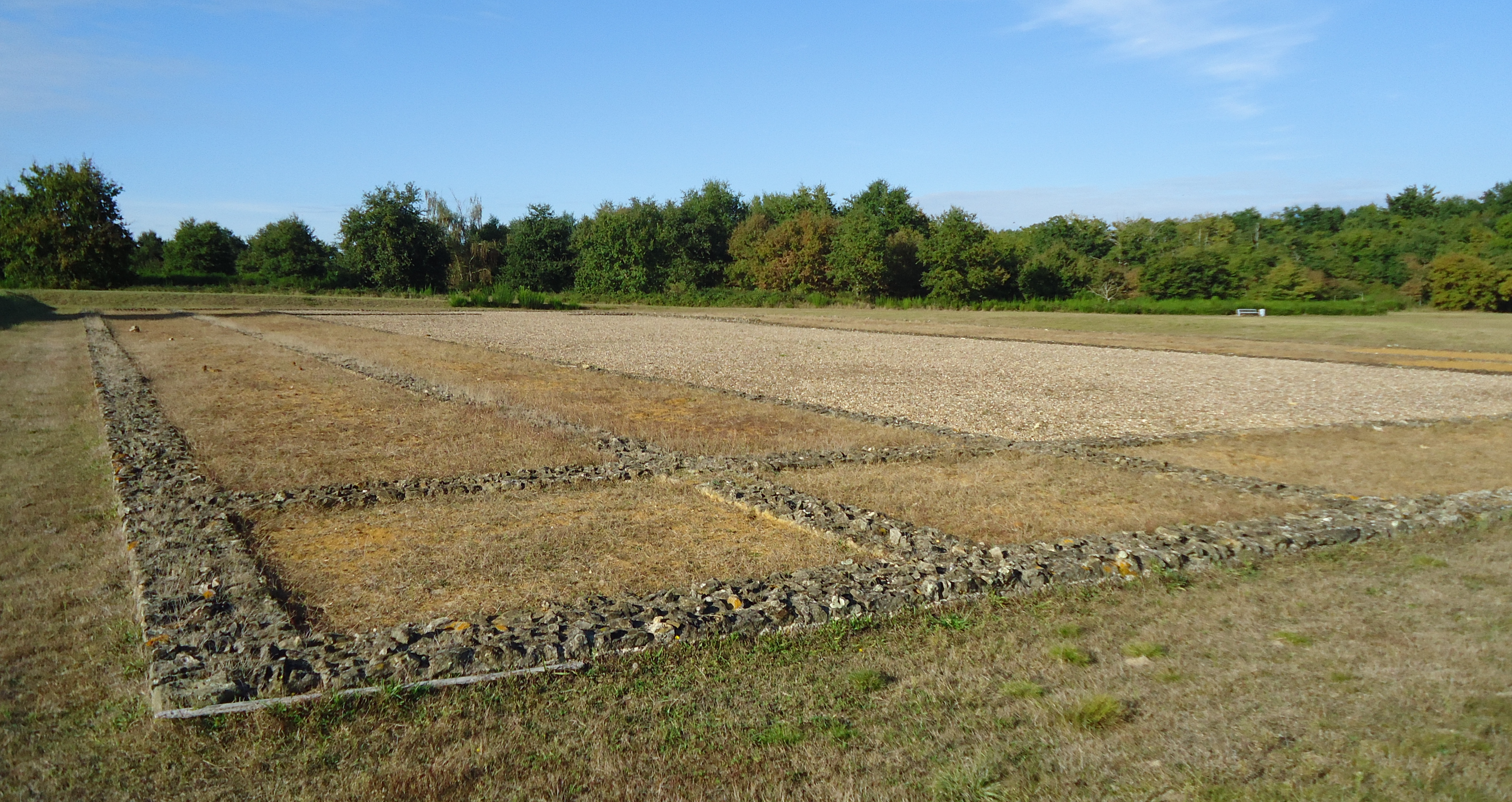
Partial view

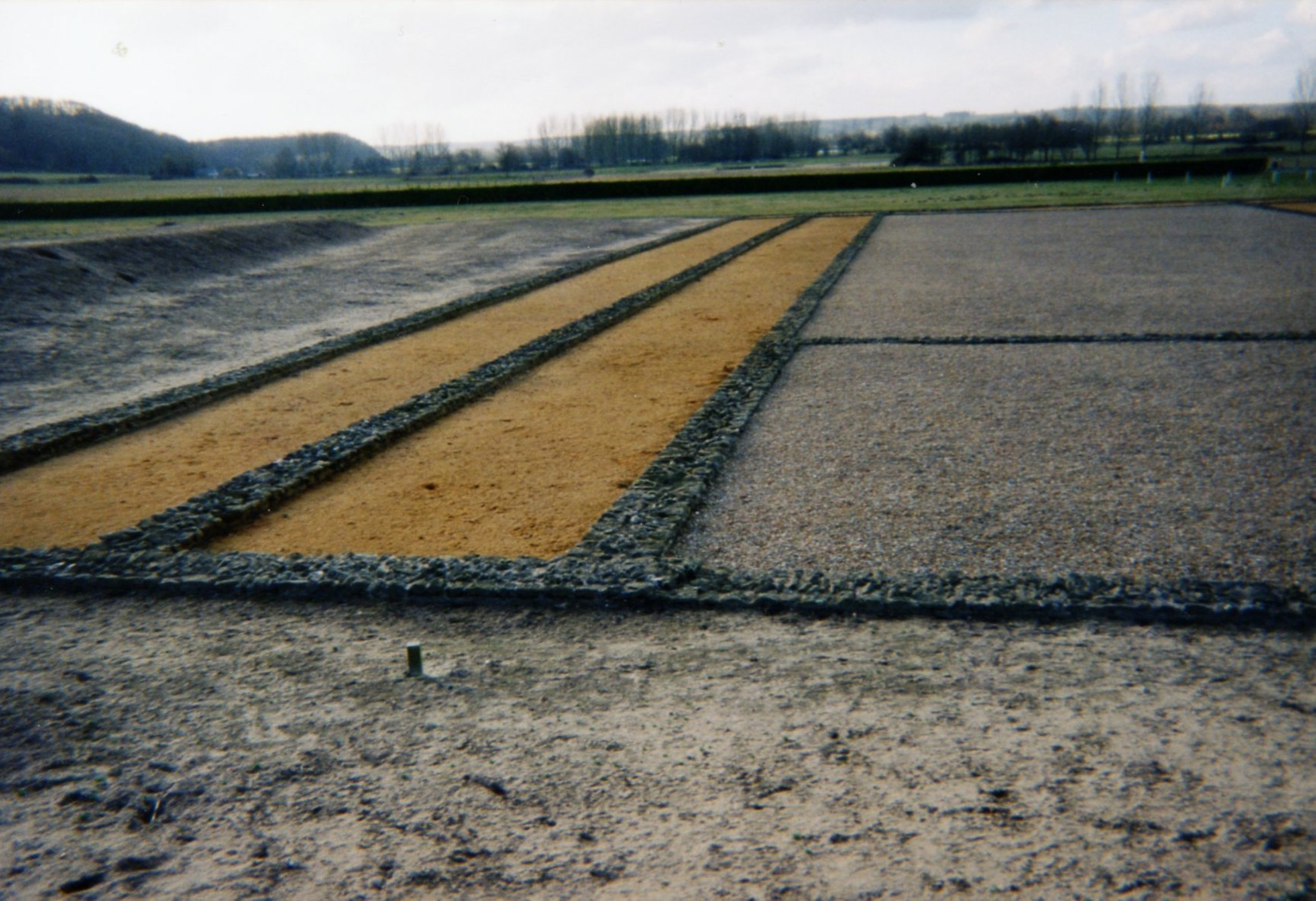
Galleries

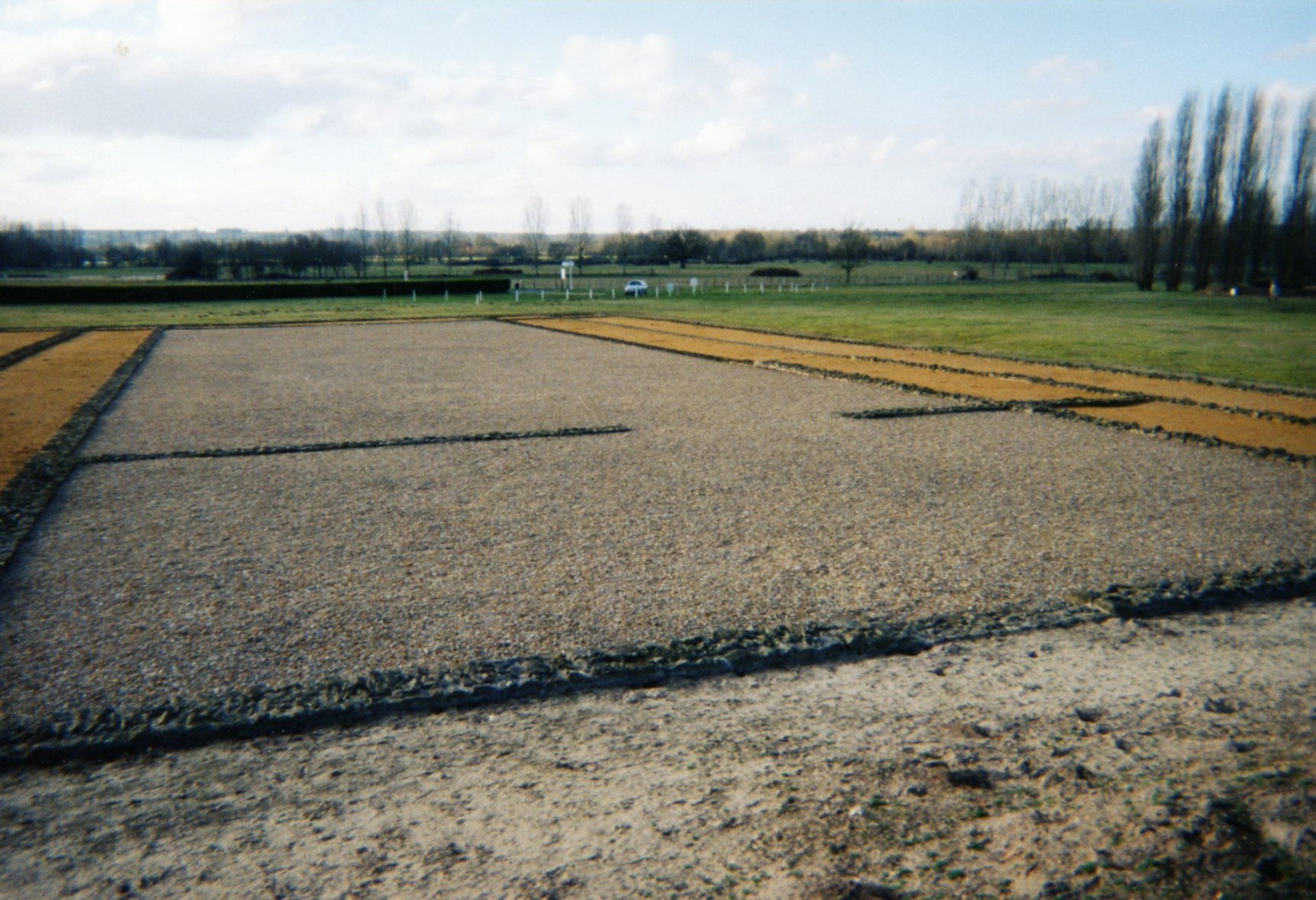
Courtyard

==== Great temple or temple No. 1 ====
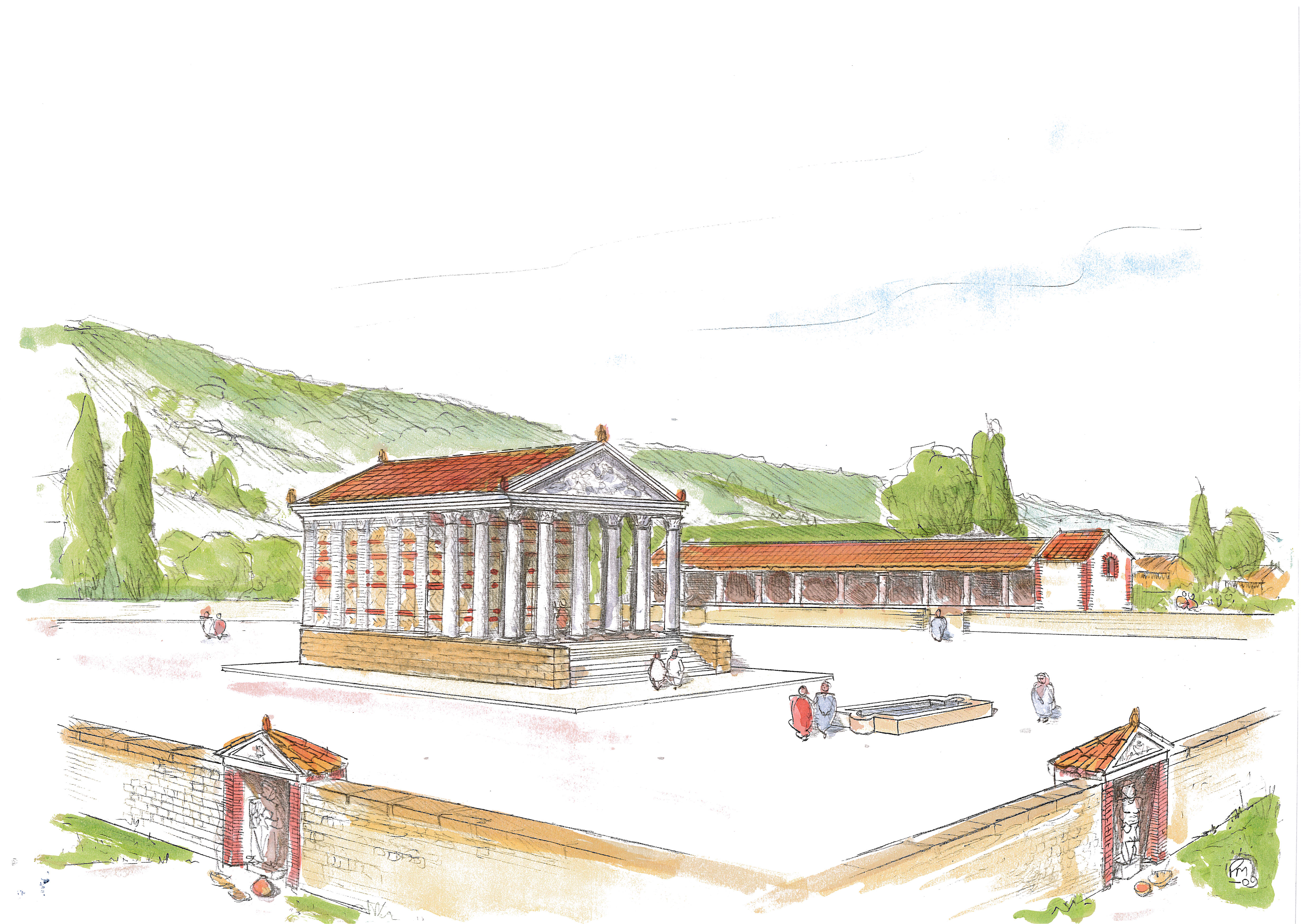
Proposed reconstruction of the remodeled great temple. Drawing by Pascal Mariette.

General plan of the temple end of the 1st century second quarter of the 2nd century

Detailed plan of the temple

The construction of the temple itself appears to have taken place toward the end of the 1st century during the reign of the emperor Domitian (81–96), with the enclosure of the peribolos and the basin dating to the second quarter of the 2nd century. Although the entire ancient monumental complex revealed significant public structures, the religious building of Cherré appears to be its main component, with the other buildings serving as dependencies for it. Excavations in 2006 uncovered six coins at the sanctuary, including two Gallic coins attributed to the final La Tène period (1st century BCE), and four Roman coins (two from the Augustan era and two dated to the 3rd century CE).

The temple (T), with a civic function, is of Celto-Roman type, rectangular in shape (27 by 15 metres (89 by 49 ft)) with a cella (C) square measuring 7.60 metres (24.9 ft) on each side, potentially reaching a height of about fifteen meters. The cella is surrounded by a gallery (G) bounded by a windowless wall on three sides, with the fourth opening to the east onto a pronaos (Pr) accessed by a staircase (Es). The temple is built on a podium, some of whose large sandstone blocks still remain. It appears to be oriented toward the rising sun on April 23 and August 19, days when the Vinalia—festivals linked to wine and the cult of Jupiter—are celebrated in Rome. The roof of the cella is most likely made of tiles, as evidenced by an epigraphic testimony found during excavations. The object is made of fired or unfired clay, likely a type of tile or brick; the inscription, appearing as a grid, probably vertical bars crossed diagonally, corresponds to a numerical system associated with an accounting document of a tilemaker.

The pronaos is bounded to the east by a colonnade hexastyle. On each of its lateral faces, two additional columns connect to the wall encircling the gallery. These columns are spaced 2.50 metres (8 ft 2 in) apart. This type of colonnade suggests an architectural configuration known as pseudoperipteral; the pattern formed by the columns and the wall, punctuated by external pilasters to the gallery, would also facilitate the movement of worshippers around the cella.

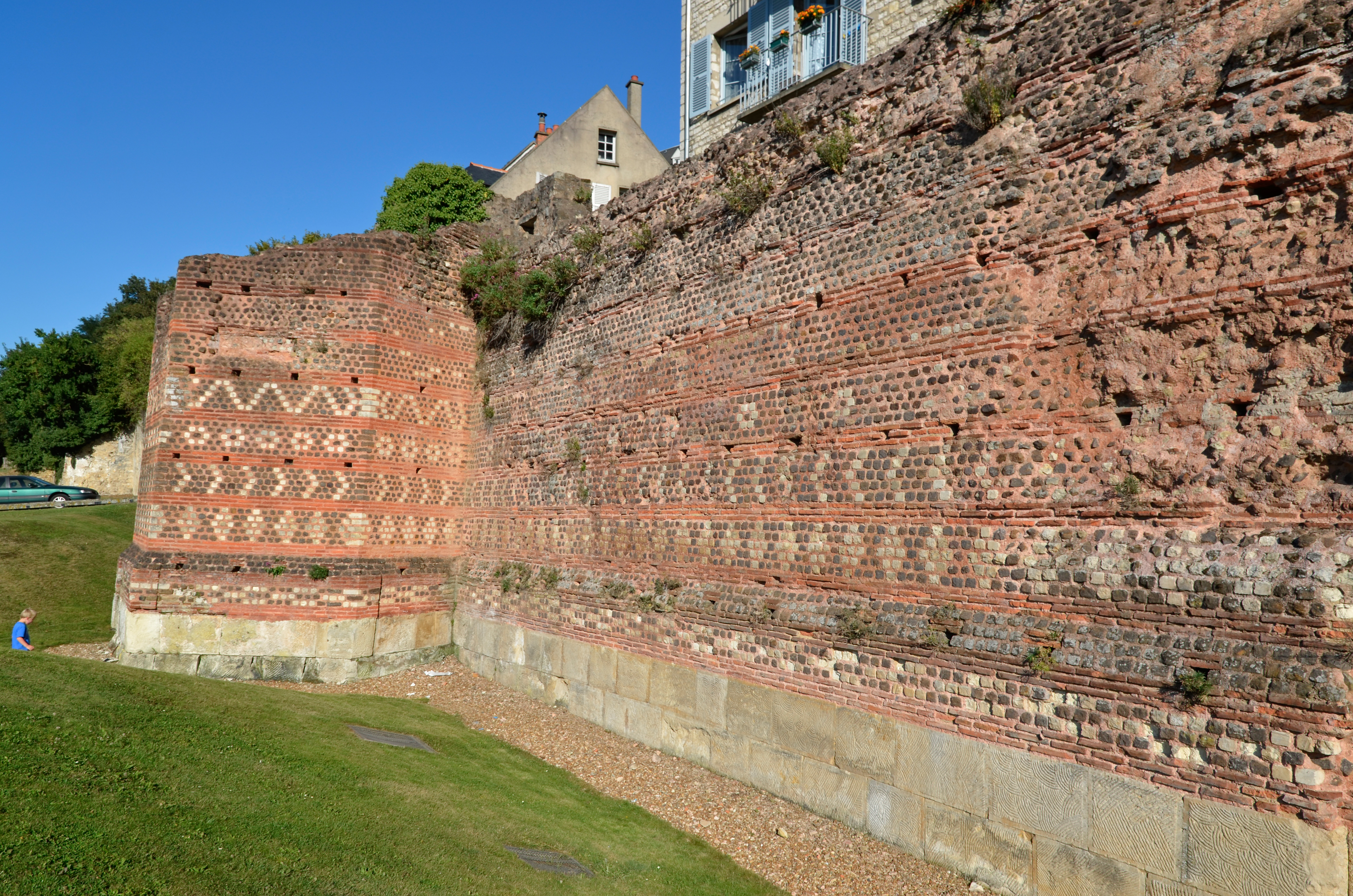
Decorations of the Gallo-Roman enclosure of Le Mans

Fallen wall sections have allowed the reconstruction of the external decoration of the gallery's walls (Note: This masonry partition partially collapsed at the junction between two of its sides.) to a height of over 14 metres (46 ft): light and dark sandstone rubble forms chevrons and oblique lines (opus spicatum), with the patterns separated by rows of terracotta; this type of decoration is found in several regional sites, possibly including the Tour de Grisset, and in the later Gallo-Roman enclosure of Le Mans. The wall features external pilasters that continue the colonnade of the pronaos. Internally, it is adorned with multicolored frescoes depicting festoons and garlands, as well as stucco motifs, and this same decoration is found on the outer face (gallery side) of the cella walls.

A large square peribolos (Pé) measuring 90 metres (300 ft) on each side surrounds the temple; its wall includes eight niches (Note: These niches or apses, according to archaeologists, likely served as shelters for statues or basins.) in exedra (E) and covered with tiles, but this rarely encountered arrangement is still poorly understood; this architectural choice is, however, seen at the Library of Hadrian in Athens. The specific orientation of the exedras seems to confirm the importance of the religious building within the Aubigné site (Note: This indicates that: [...] the sanctuary was a focal point and probably the main place of convergence for the agglomeration.) It is, however, confirmed that two pilasters, similar to those decorating the sanctuary's gallery wall, frame each exedra. Additionally, the exedras of the peribolos are likely decorated with paintings applied to tegulae affixed to the wall. An entrance has been formally identified; in the northern wall, preceded by a porch (4 by 2.50 metres (13.1 by 8.2 ft)), it provides access to the nearby galleried building, but it is also aligned with the axis of a second temple further north. A second entrance likely existed in the eastern wall of the peribolos, facing the temple's staircase, but no trace of it is known.

In the courtyard, 10 metres (33 ft) east of the temple's entrance and slightly off-axis from it, lies a basin (B) with masonry walls built in small rubble. Although heavily damaged by an unauthorized excavation initiated by the plot's tenant in 1974, it has been fully reconstructed. It is rectangular with rounded apse-like ends and measures 9.43 by 4.70 metres (30.9 by 15.4 ft). One of the basin's functions appears to be collecting infiltration water from the peribolos, and similar features have been identified in other temples.

The temple's architecture and ground dimensions make it comparable to the Maison Carrée in Nîmes, though it differs notably in the masonry technique used and its internal layout. (Note: This architectural arrangement differs from certain Gallo-Roman temples, such as those at Mauves-sur-Loire and Jublains. The [[pronaos|pronaos]], a common architectural element in the temples of Cherré and Nîmes, is entirely absent in those of Jublains and Mauves-sur-Loire.) The dimensions, architecture, and decoration of this temple, along with a fragment of a Victory statue found on-site, suggest that the building may have been dedicated to the imperial cult or associated with a "warrior cult". The ornaments and architecture of the Cherré temple, like those of the temples at Oisseau-le-Petit and Sablé-sur-Sarthe, appear more elaborate than those of the Sanctuary of Mars Mullo at Allonnes.

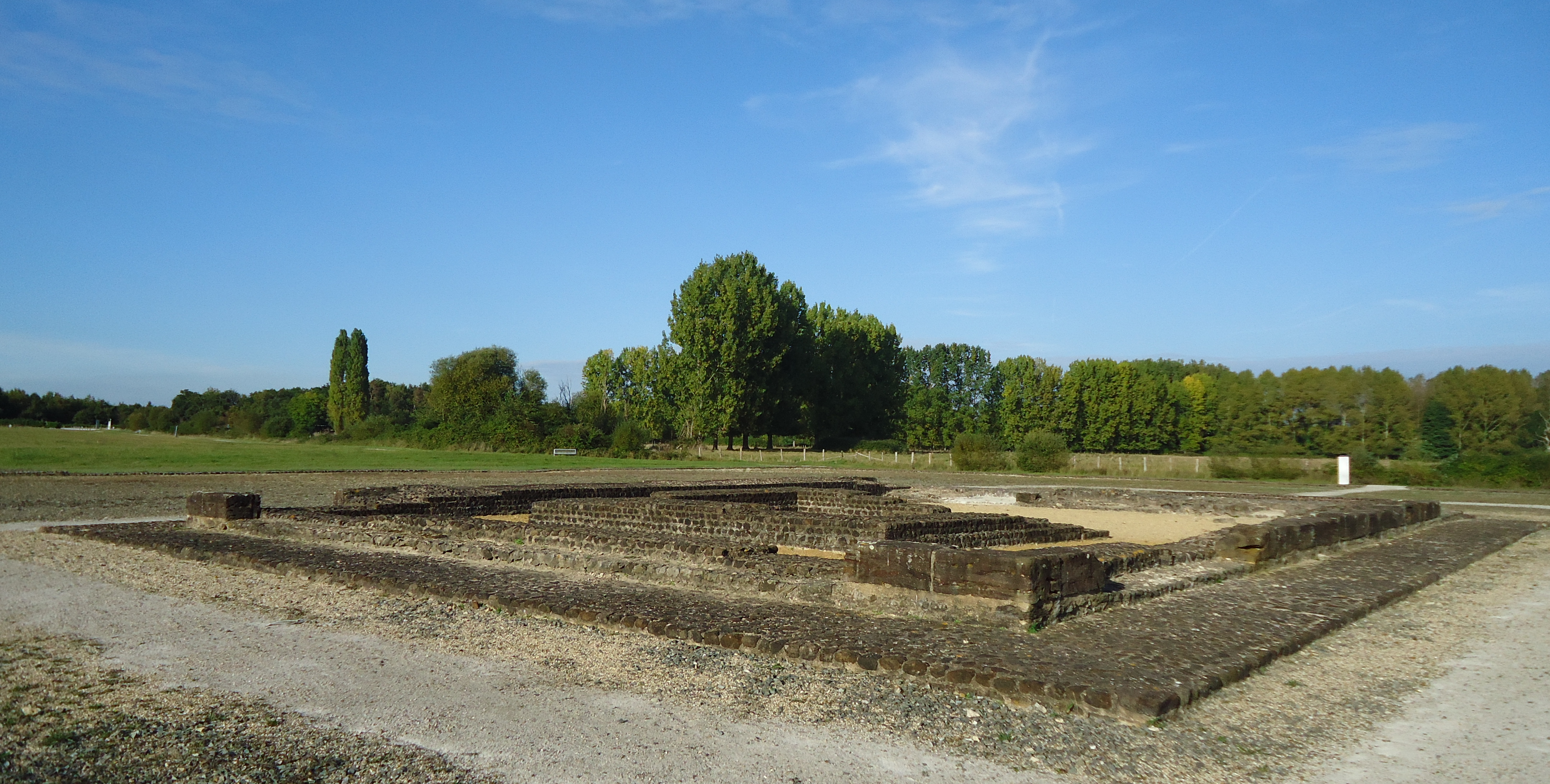
Foundations of the temple

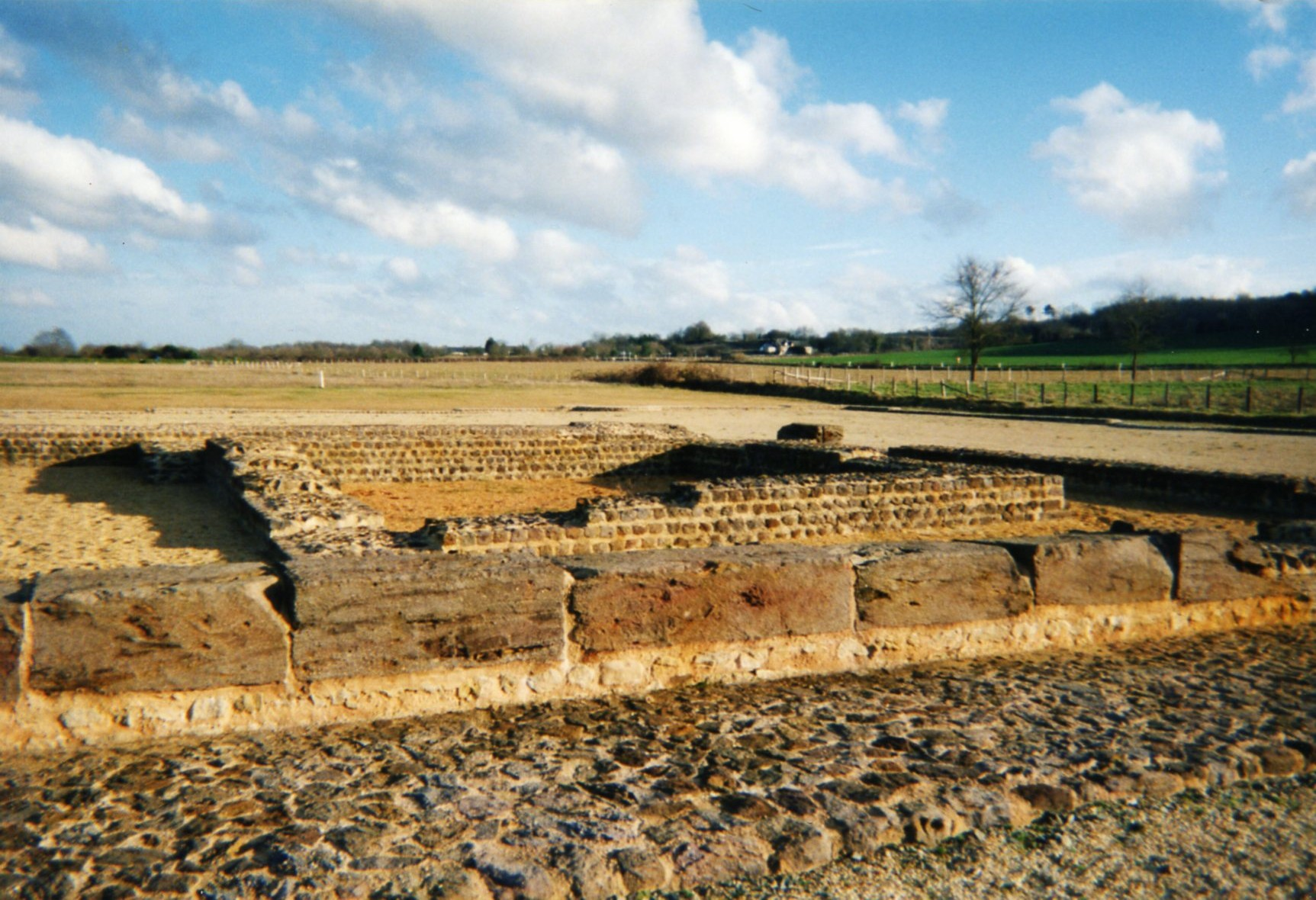
Cella

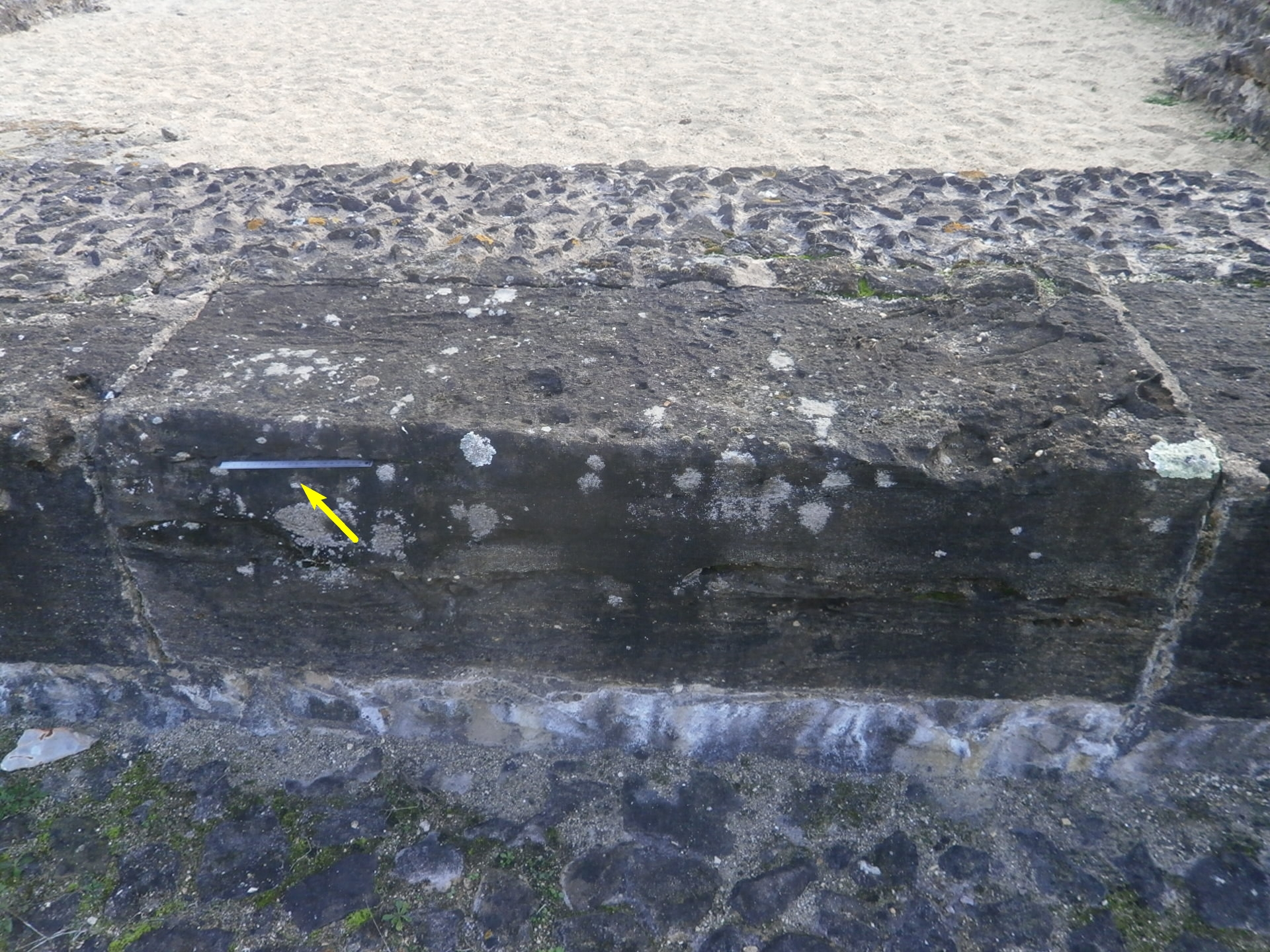
Large sandstone block (Note: The ruler indicated by a yellow arrow measures 0.20 metres (7.9 in).)

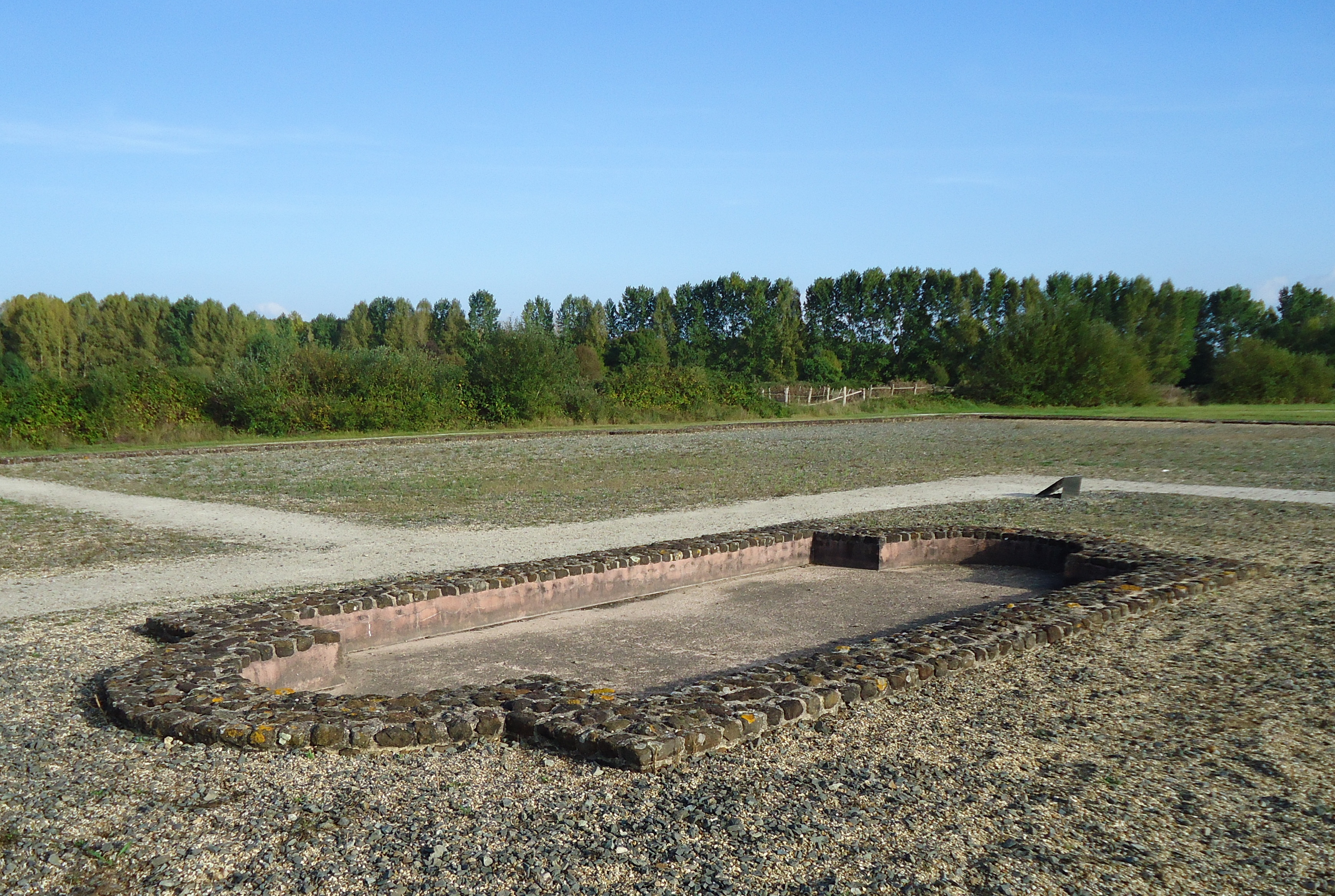
Basin

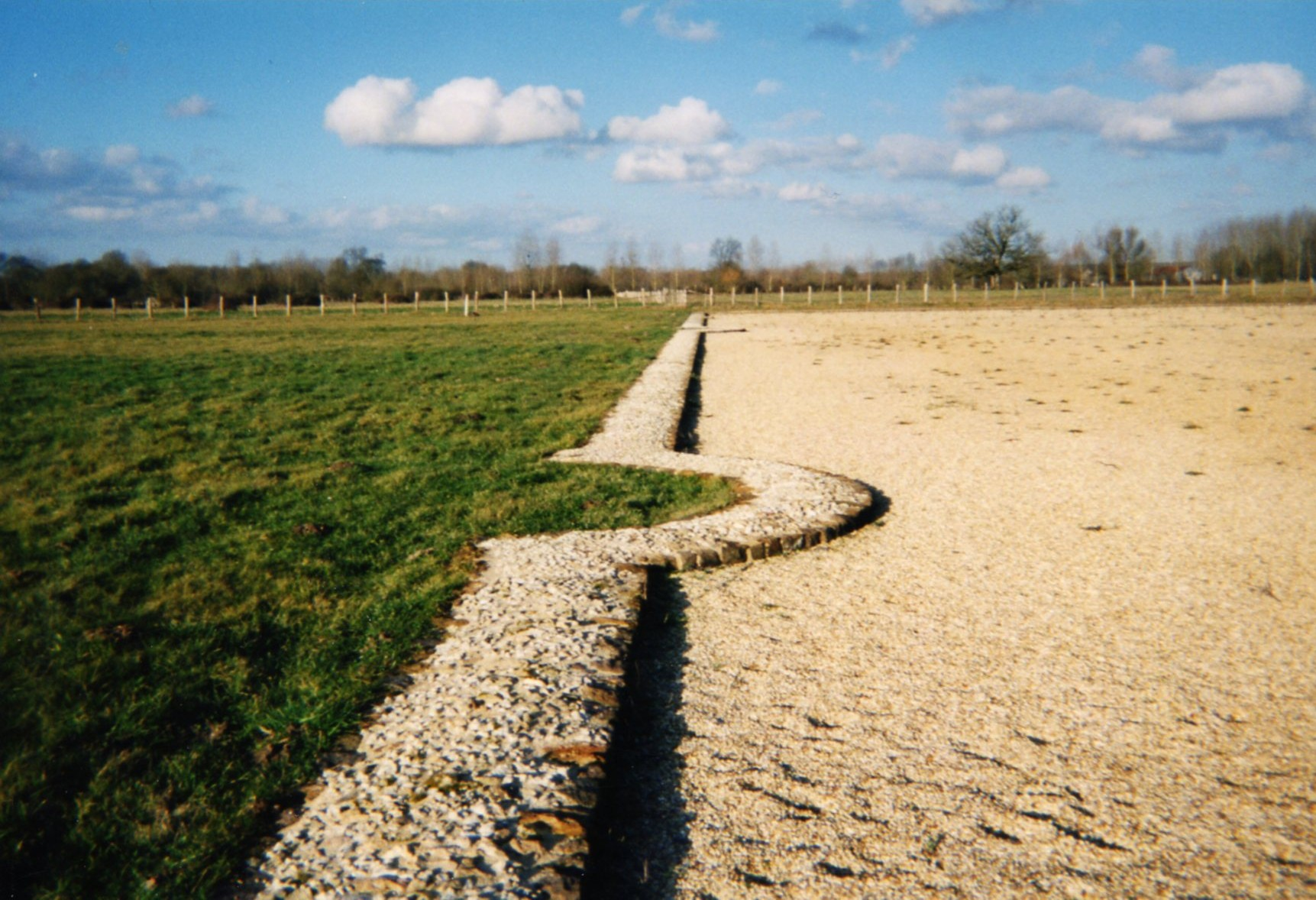
Peribolos wall and exedra niche

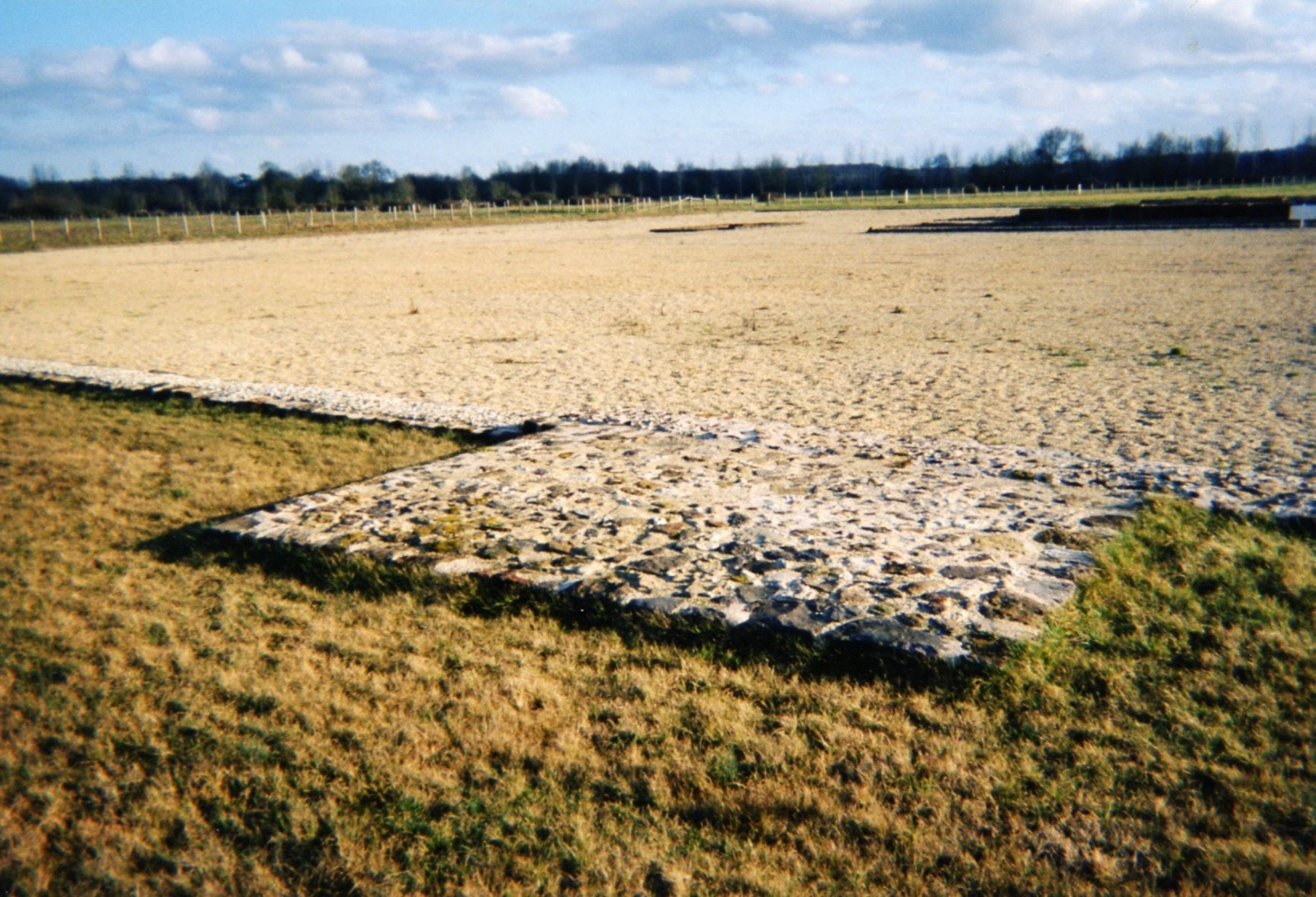
Northern entrance porch

==== Baths ====
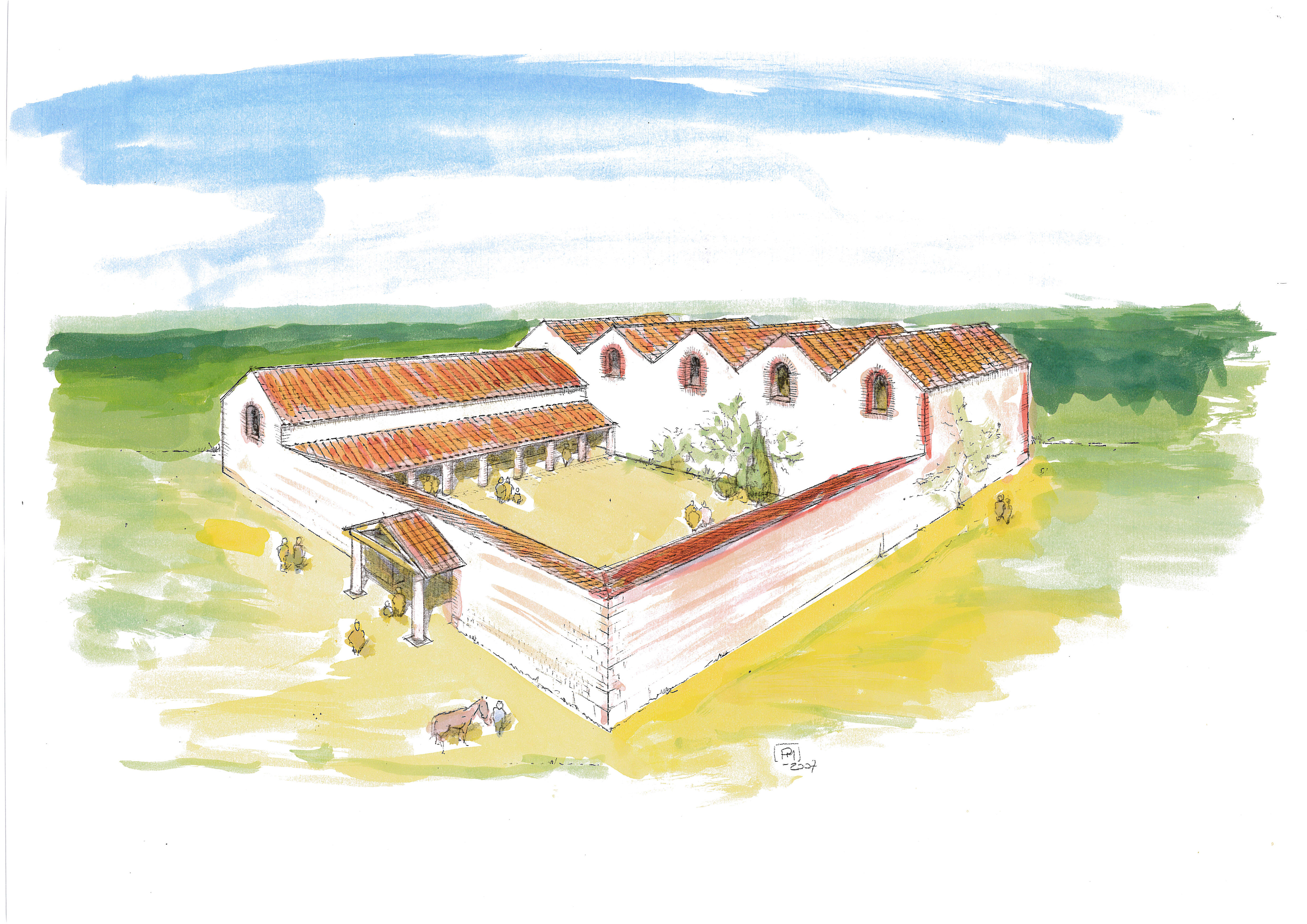
Proposed reconstruction of the baths (second phase). Drawing by Pascal Mariette.

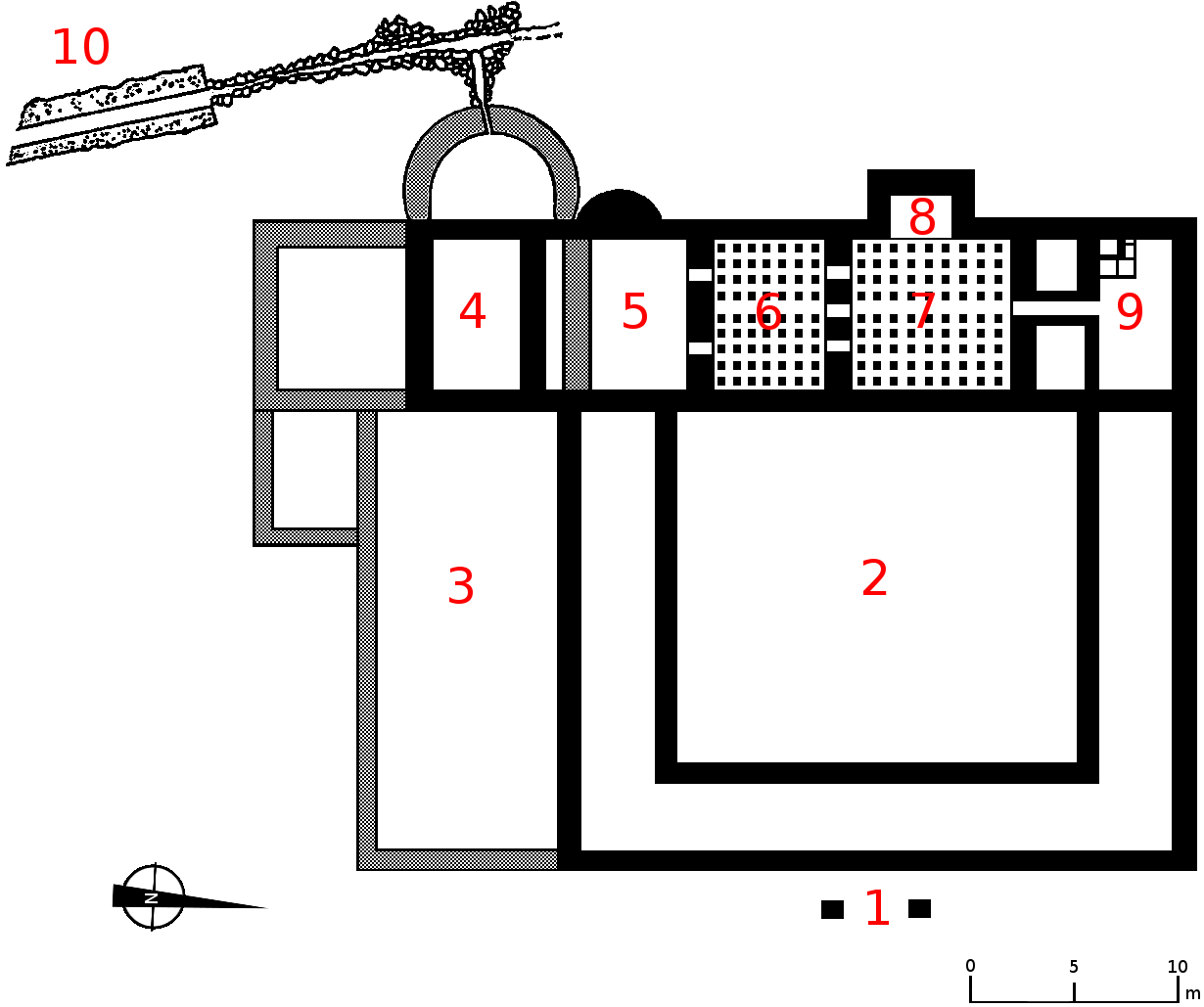
Plan of the Cherré baths last quarter of the 1st century second half of the 2nd century

The Cherré baths, excavated from 1989 to 1991, form a large complex measuring 35 by 30 metres (115 by 98 ft) resulting from construction in the last quarter of the 1st century and an expansion in the first half of the 2nd century; several rooms were then added to the south of the complex, including an apodyterium (3) and a cold pool built as an external apse to the west of the frigidarium. In 1966, Adrien Percheron de Monchy, based on partial surveys, proposed several hypotheses about the nature of the complex: a large public establishment, the balneum of a private residence, or that of a larger building intended to accommodate pilgrims. However, the small size of the strictly bathing rooms of the Cherré baths suggests they were not open to a very large public, but perhaps reserved for the use of the attendants of the nearby temple.

The abandonment of the baths, at the end of the 2nd or the early 3rd century, seems relatively early compared to the other buildings on the site.

In their final configuration, the baths have an asymmetrical centered plan and cover an area of 926 square metres (9,970 sq ft). Access to the complex is from the east through a door protected by an awning (1) supported by wooden posts. The palaestra (2) measuring 15 by 14.20 metres (49.2 by 46.6 ft), centrally located, is surrounded on three sides by a gallery (Note: According to historian Pierre Sillières, the architectural layout of the baths at the Cherré-Aubigné-Racan site is very similar to that of the baths of the Roman city Baelo Claudia, located in the Roman province of Bética (modern Andalusia).) forming a portico. The fourth wing, on the west side, features the sequence of rooms in the strictly thermal sector, from the frigidarium (4) to the south to the caldarium (7) with a hot pool (8) to the north, requiring users to backtrack to end with a passage through the cold pool, thus respecting the usual path within a bathing establishment. Within this fourth wing, in addition to these bathing structures, another large room has been identified, which may have served as a "sports room" (Note: In antiquity, this type of bathing structure was also called basilica thermarum.) The heated rooms (6 and 7) benefit from underfloor heating (hypocausts) from a praefurnium (9) and water drainage is ensured by a dry-stone conduit leading to a masonry channel (10) partially arranged as latrines and heading south. Metal elements, in the form of T- or L-shaped clamps, secure the insulation and heating devices of the walls of the bathing building.

At the time of the discovery of the remains, only the wall of the cold pool remained slightly elevated. However, it is confirmed that the marbles adorning the monument partly originate from local or regional sources, but also from more distant deposits, such as the quarries of Saint-Béat marble. A kiln and lime pits were found in the baths' courtyard, as well as temporary structures (a hut, postholes for scaffolding), all possibly related to its construction site. Additionally, like the forum, the remains of the bathing complex yielded sigillata ceramic pieces, one of which depicts a figure and decorations in the form of rosettes and plants.

Cherré Baths

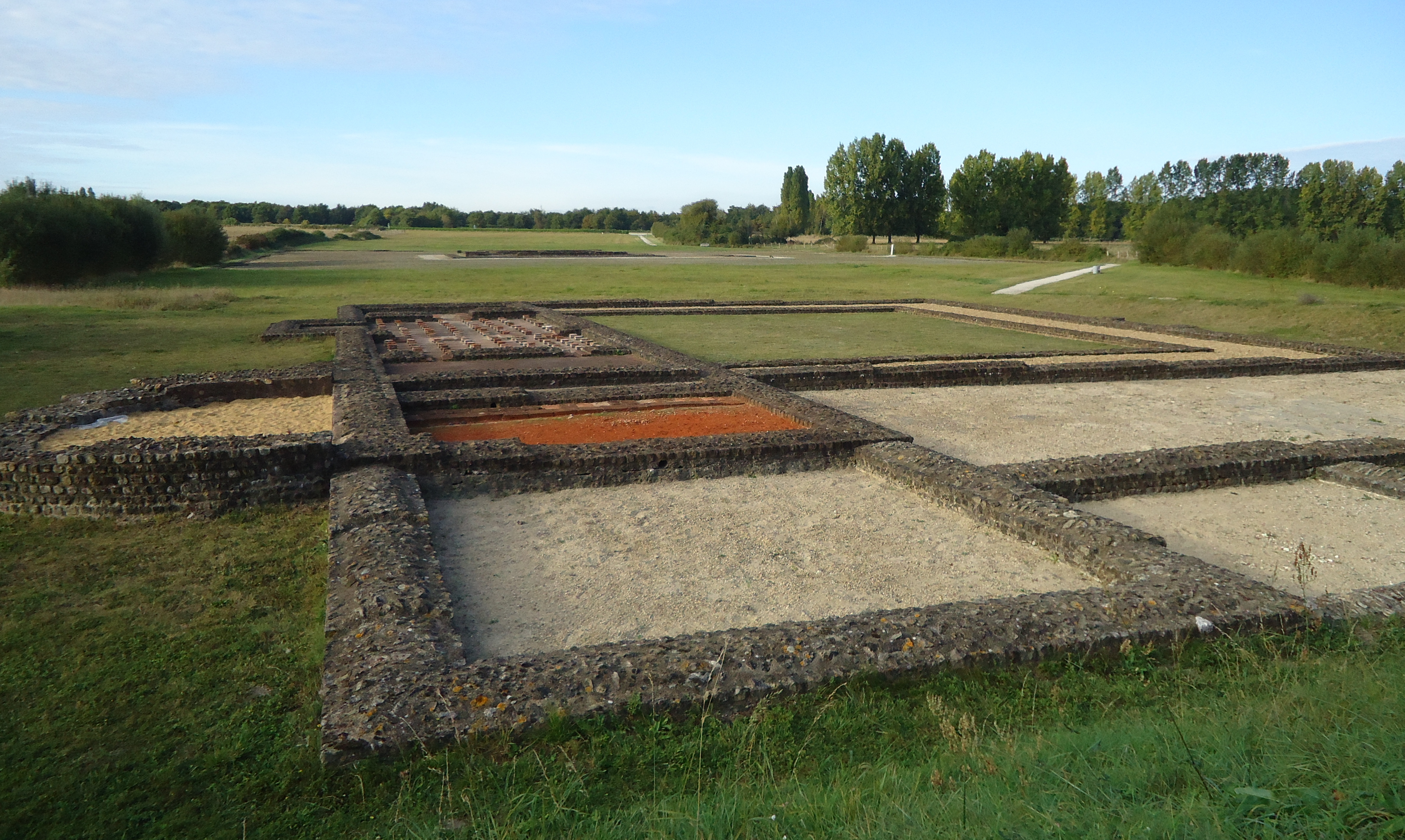
Foundations

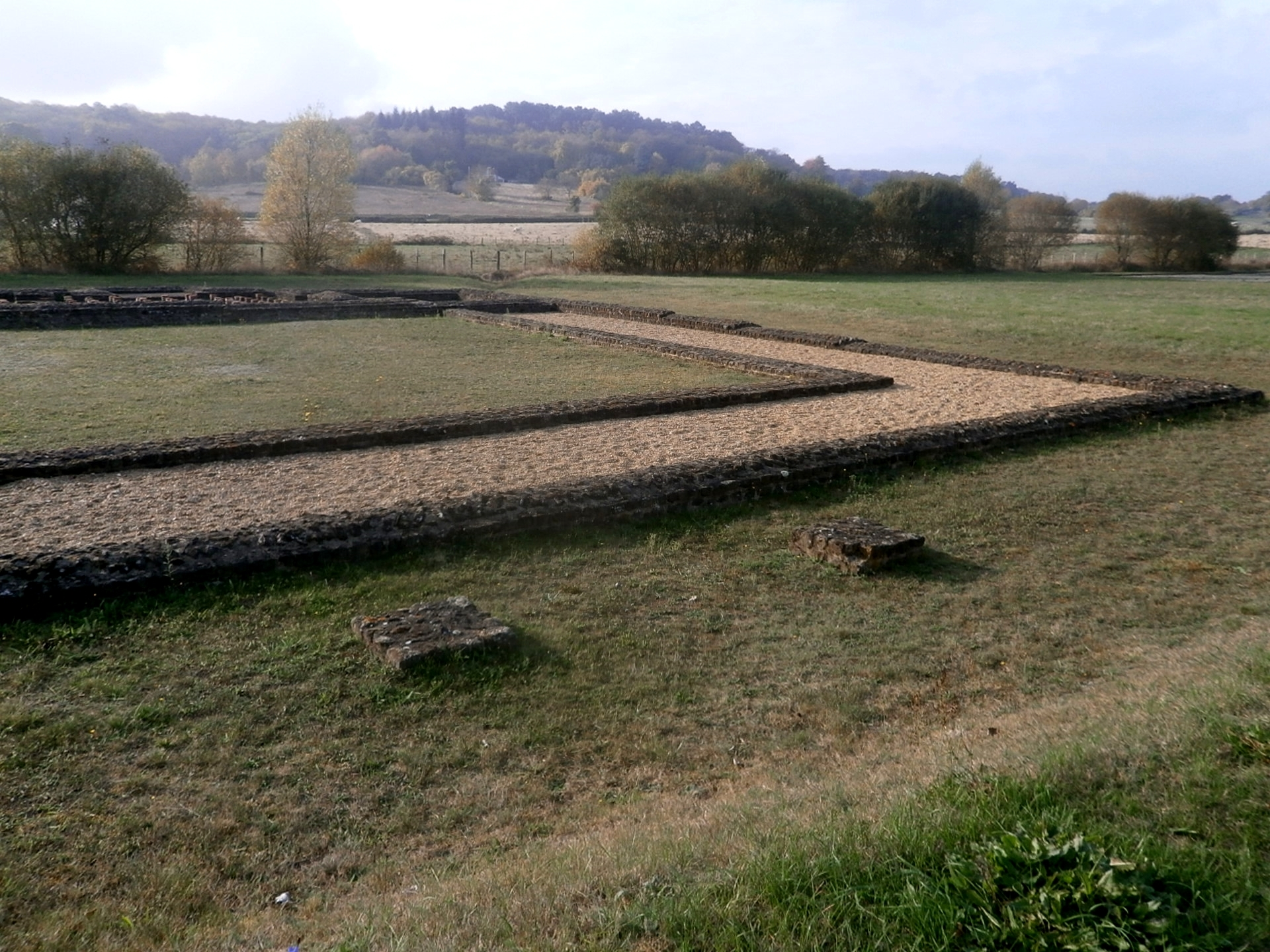
Pillars of the entrance awning

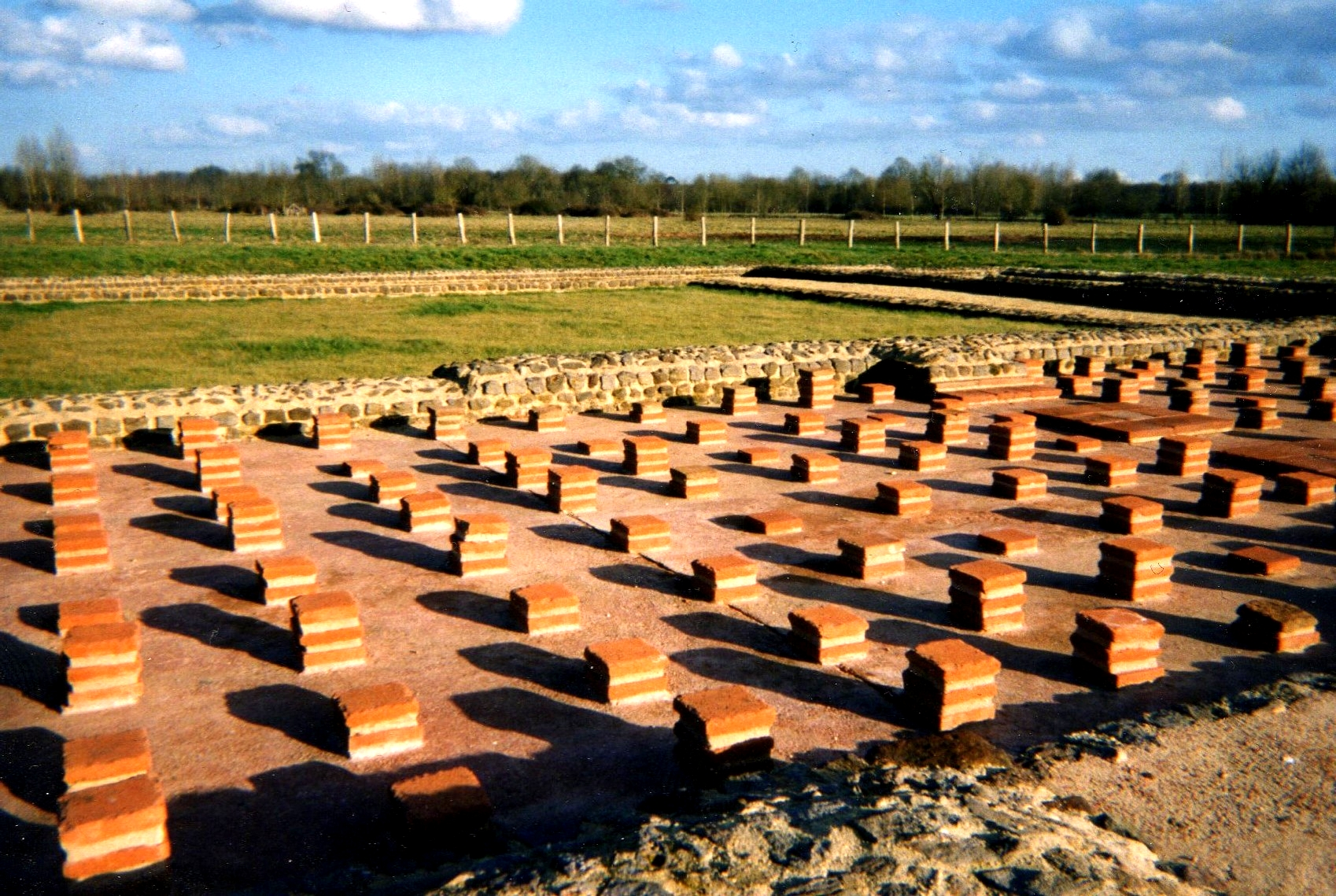
Reconstruction of hypocaust pillars

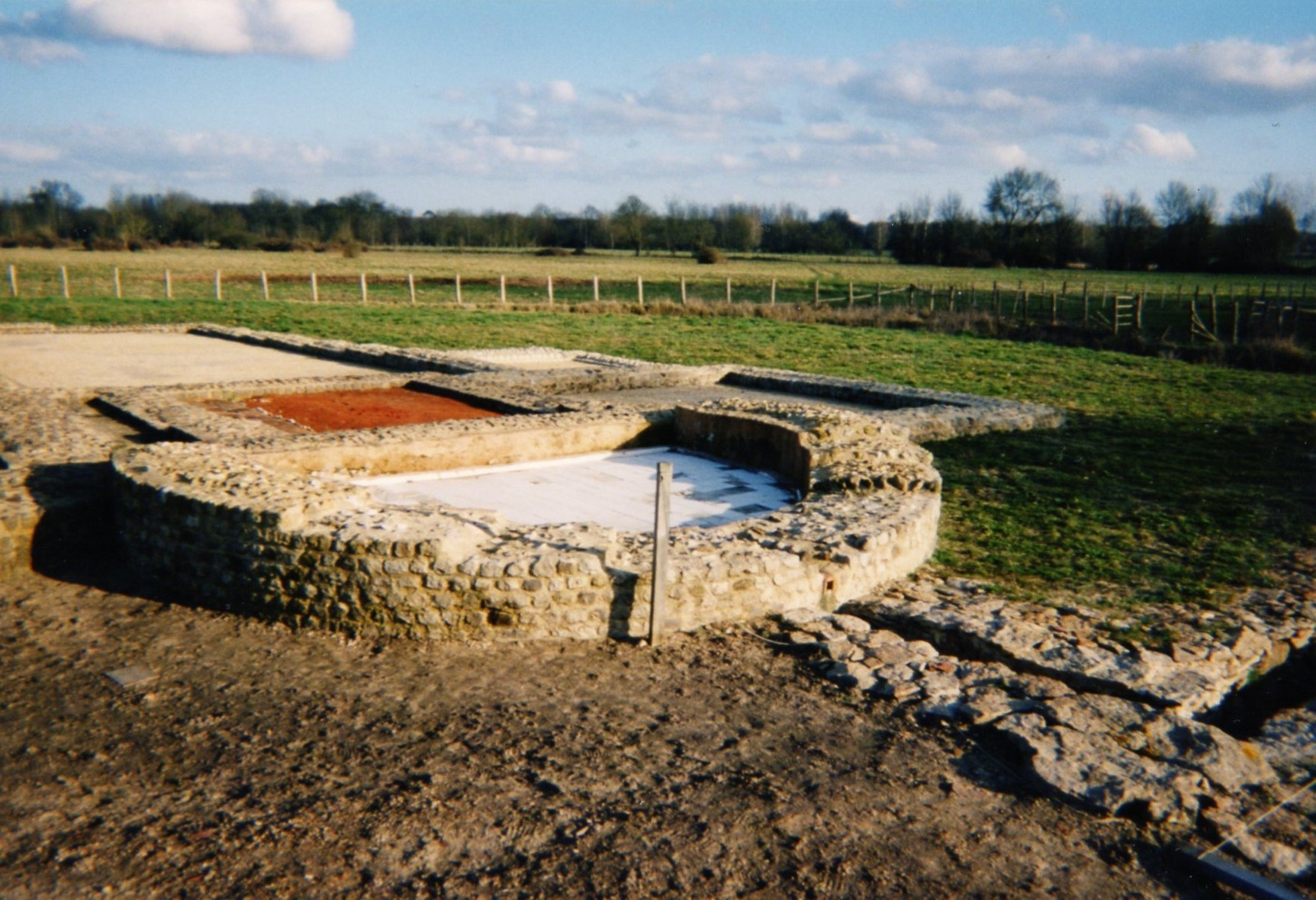
Cold pool

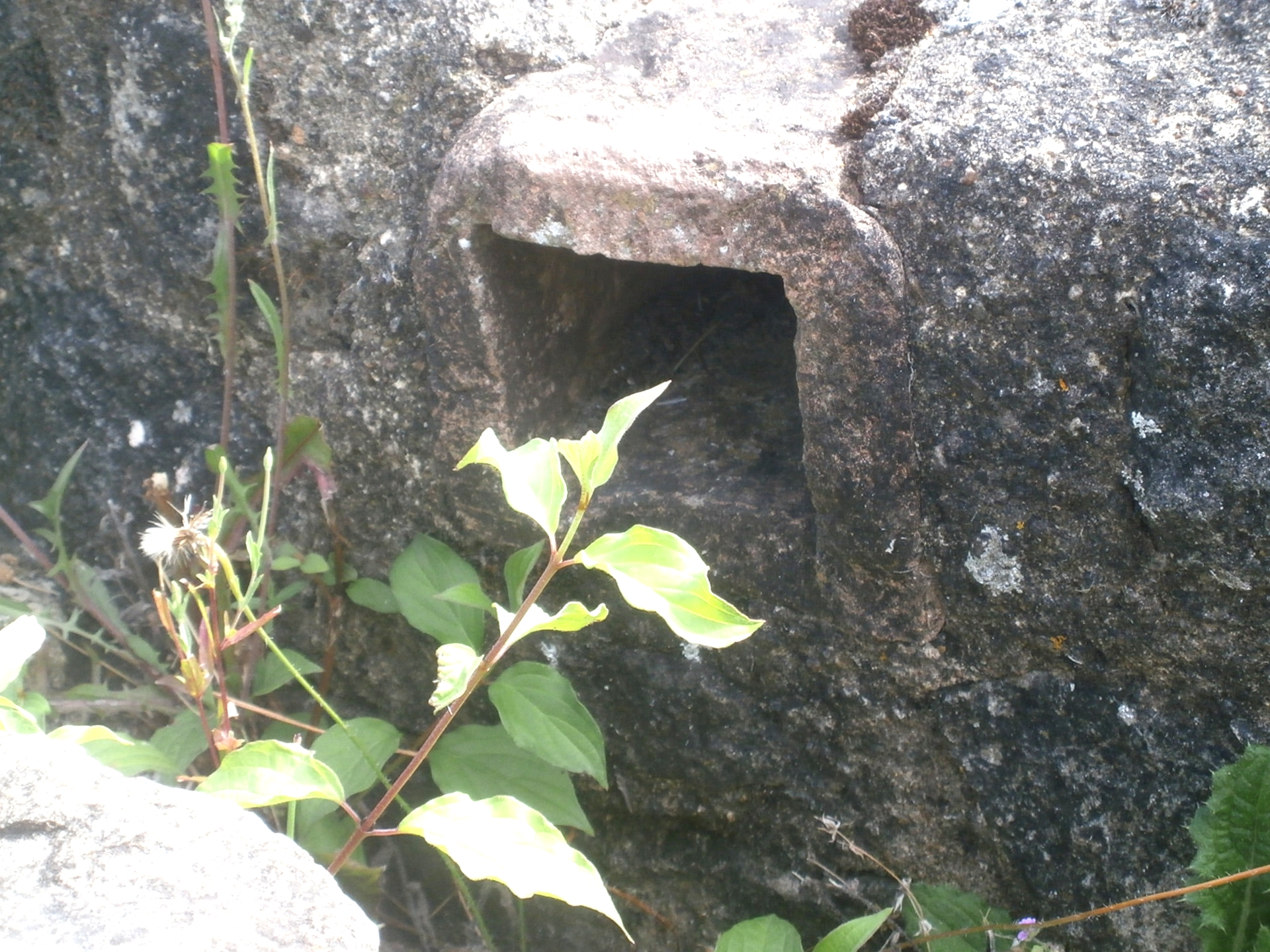
Drainage of the cold pool water

=== Other features ===
==== Aqueduct ====
Path of the aqueduct

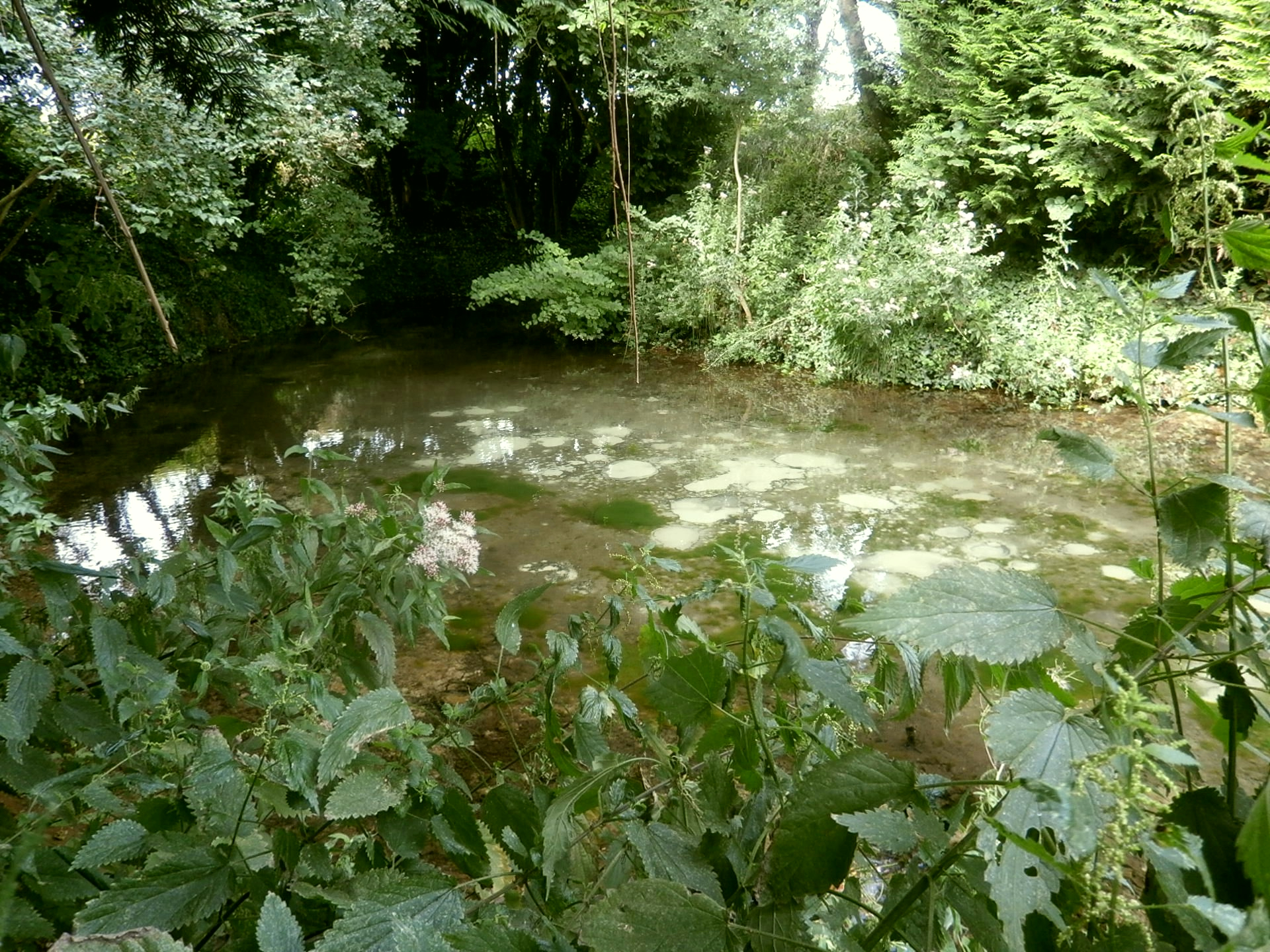
Chenon spring basin

The water supply for the entire site, including the forum to the north and the baths to the south, is provided by a fully underground aqueduct, reconstructed after studies conducted in 2001–2003. At least one inspection manhole has been identified. Halfway up the hillside, west of the baths, a wooden reservoir measuring 2 by 2 metres (6 ft 7 in by 6 ft 7 in) regulates the pressure and distribution of the aqueduct's water. Beyond this point, no remains have been found in the terminal part of the aqueduct near the site, suggesting it may have been aerial. The amount of materials (stone and concrete) used for the aqueduct's construction is estimated at 7,000 tonnes (6,900 long tons; 7,700 short tons). Its construction appears contemporary with that of the baths. It is largely fed by a spring, known as "La Fontaine de Chenon," which would have been its starting point. Other springs, such as the partially channeled Saint-Hubert fountain in Coulongé, may have supplemented its flow along its path. The Chenon spring, no longer connected to the obstructed aqueduct, now flows into a stream. The aqueduct's flow rate is estimated at 15 litres per second (200 imp gal/min) based on the modern flow rate of the Chenon spring (12,000 cubic metres per day (4,900 cu ft/ks)) and its average slope is estimated at 0.63 metres per kilometre (3.3 ft/mi). The high carbon dioxide content of the water, preventing the formation of limescale deposits, reduces the risk of obstruction in the small aqueduct channel.

==== Water drainage systems ====
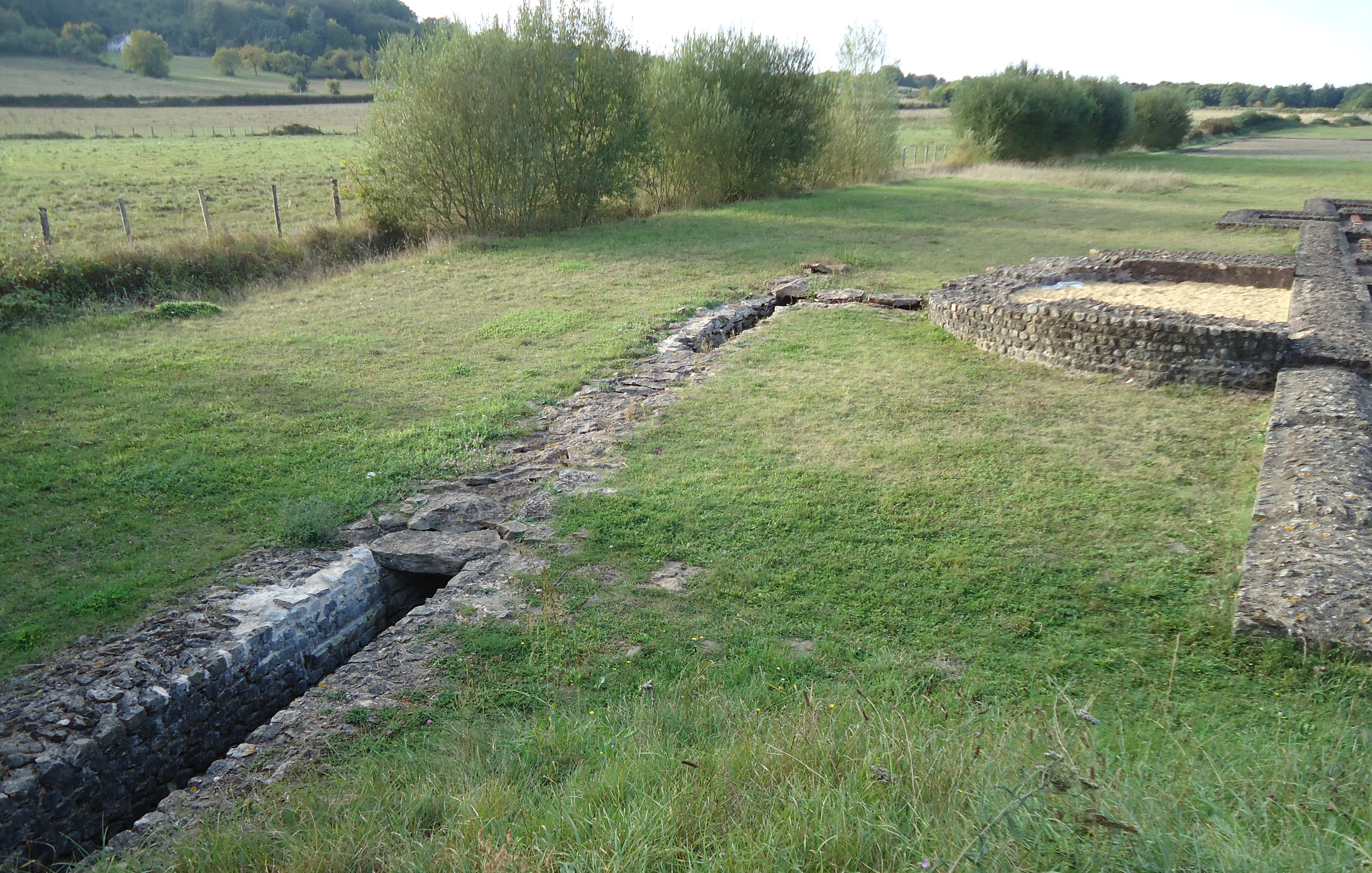
Drainage channel for wastewater from the baths

To the west of the temple, crossing the peribolos, a drainage system, likely necessitated by the marshy nature of the terrain on which the monument is built, has been uncovered and sections of sewers or drainage pipes, possibly made of wood hooped with iron bands, have been identified. Others appear to be made of dry stones covered with sandstone slabs. The ensemble forms a network of drains to which the temple's basin is likely connected; the ground of the peribolos itself consists of an impermeable layer of compacted limestone covered with sand, and the perimeter of the temple forms a slope directing roof runoff water away from the foundations.

The collector located west of the baths serves a triple function. Upstream of the baths, consisting of a pipeline of small superimposed sandstone slabs covered with large sandstone slabs, it contributes to draining the surrounding terrain and collects water from the temple and its peribolos. Through a branch at the level of the baths, it evacuates their wastewater. Downstream of the baths, it is a masonry channel partially arranged as latrines, some of whose cover slabs, provided with circular notches, have been recovered. It is oriented toward the Loir River, but its path beyond Cherré is unknown.

==== Unidentified or unstudied buildings ====
Aerial photography has revealed the existence of a large building, 40 metres (130 ft) long, with galleries to the north of the temple. A door in the peribolos wall of the temple connected the two structures. This building had not yet been studied as of 2016; it may be a structure for accommodating pilgrims, similar to those uncovered near temples in the sanctuaries of Mauves-sur-Loire (Loire-Atlantique) or Entrammes (Mayenne), where a building measuring 38 by 11 metres (125 by 36 ft) was identified.

A second temple, unexcavated, was discovered north of the first sanctuary; it appears smaller (12 by 9.5 metres (39 by 31 ft)), its cella has not been identified, but it is built on a podium accessed by a staircase. It is separated from the great temple by the marshy area used as a repository for protohistoric weapon deposits.

The site also includes at least four other buildings, also revealed by aerial prospection in the late 1980s and early 1990s, but neither their dating, nature, nor function have yet been determined, one of which may be a domus or a mansio.

==== Road network ====
Several sections of the road network have been identified on the site, but they are scattered, not necessarily established at the same time, and current data do not allow for the reconstruction of an organized road system. The existence of such a network, whose extent and density are unknown, is nonetheless conceivable to connect all the monumental components of the site, particularly in a north–south direction for the main aligned buildings. François Liger, as early as the late 19th century, mentioned remains of this road, comparable to a cardo, but no more recent study has found its trace.

Seemingly passing along the northern edge of the elongated building accompanying the temple to the north, two road segments, which appear aligned east–west, could mark the location of a road crossing the site from east to west.

The basin in the temple's courtyard is situated on the path of an alley (V) leading toward the temple's staircase, which it intersects. This 4 metres (13 ft) wide road was identified between the basin and the eastern wall of the peribolos, but no threshold corresponding to it has been identified in the peribolos wall.

Two other road elements have been identified, but they seem to relate to a later occupation of the site, medieval or even modern. The elongated building north of the temple was destroyed late, and a road, roughly oriented east–west and flanked by ditches, was partially built on its footprint, paved with its debris. Another road segment (northeast–southwest), partly constructed with materials from the demolition of the baths, was identified south of the site.

==== Undetermined status ====
The very nature of the ancient site of Cherré has long been debated, and, in 2016, its status is likely not definitive, evolving with discoveries at the site as well as broader studies on the typology of such complexes. In 1931, the Aubigné site was classified as a vicus. Excavations undertaken from the 1970s concluded that Cherré was a rural complex. In 1979, the term conciliabulum (place of assemblies) was used for the first time, alongside the term "rural complex", and it was in the early 1980s that the term "large rural sanctuary" was used.

Since 1995, following significant studies on the typology of such complexes and in the absence of confirmed evidence of habitation, the term "secondary agglomeration" has been adopted. Several authors emphasize that Cherré corresponds to a "secondary agglomeration with predominantly religious functions, a religious complex apparently without habitation". Yvan Maligorne also considers that the ancient urban complex of Cherré manifests as a "secondary agglomeration", including a notion of subordination to the capital.

== Bibliography ==
=== Publications specifically dedicated to the Cherré site ===
- Lambert, Claude; Rioufreyt, Jean (1976). "Le complexe antique de Cherré (Aubigné-Racan, Sarthe)" [The Ancient Complex of Cherré (Aubigné-Racan, Sarthe)]. La Province du Maine (in French). 19: 231–235.
- Lambert, Claude; Rioufreyt, Jean (1978–1979). Le théâtre gallo-romain de Cherré à Aubigné-Racan, campagnes de fouilles 1977 et 1978 [The Gallo-Roman Theater of Cherré at Aubigné-Racan, Excavation Campaigns 1977 and 1978] (in French). Le Mans: La Province du Maine, fascicules 27 à 31. p. 71.
- Lambert, Claude; Rioufreyt, Jean. "Nouvelles fouilles : Aubigné-Racan". In Dossiers de l'Archéologie (1989).
- Lambert, Claude; Rioufreyt, Jean (1990). "Le complexe antique de Cherré à Aubigné-Racan" [The Ancient Complex of Cherré at Aubigné-Racan]. La Province du Maine (in French). 16 (4): 345–356. LR90.
- Lambert, Claude; Rioufreyt, Jean (2000). "Le grand sanctuaire rural d'Aubigné-Racan et l'agglomération antique de Vaas" [The Large Rural Sanctuary of Aubigné-Racan and the Ancient Agglomeration of Vaas]. Cahiers de Vedacensis (in French) (5): 20–30. V00.
- Lambert, Claude; Rioufreyt, Jean (2012). "L'aqueduc du sanctuaire gallo-romain d'Aubigné-Racan et l'alimentation en eau des monuments" [The Aqueduct of the Gallo-Roman Sanctuary of Aubigné-Racan and the Water Supply of the Monuments]. Cahiers de Vedacensis (in French) (17): 33–37. V12.
- Lambert, Claude; Rioufreyt, Jean (2014). "Aubigné-Racan. Dans les méandres du Loir, un grand sanctuaire gallo-romain" [Aubigné-Racan. In the Meanders of the Loir, a Large Gallo-Roman Sanctuary]. In Jacques Cailleteau (ed.). Affluents de la Loire. Morceaux choisis [Tributaries of the Loire. Selected Pieces] (in French). Nantes: Revue 303. pp. 64–70.
- Marton, Pauline (2008). Laissez-vous conter le site archéologique d'Aubigné-Racan [Let Us Tell You About the Archaeological Site of Aubigné-Racan] (in French). Syndicat Mixte du Pays Vallée du Loir, Pays d'art et d'histoire de la Vallée du Loir. p. 12.
- Palustre, Léon (1877). "Le théâtre d'Aubigné (Sarthe)" [The Theater of Aubigné (Sarthe)]. Bulletin Monumental. 5 (in French). 43 (1): 86–90.
- Percheron de Monchy, Adrien (1965). "La ville romaine de Cherray en Aubigné" [The Roman City of Cherray in Aubigné]. Revue historique et archéologique du Maine (in French). 45: 96–124.
- Percheron de Monchy, Adrien (1966). "La ville romaine de Cherray en Aubigné" [The Roman City of Cherray in Aubigné]. Revue historique et archéologique du Maine (in French). 46: 116–146.

=== General publications wholly or partially dedicated to ancient architecture or heritage ===
- "Les théâtres de la Gaule romaine" [The Theaters of Roman Gaul]. Dossiers de l'Archéologie [Archaeology Files] (in French). 134. 1989. ISSN 1141-7137.
- Bertrand, Estelle; Sarreste, Florian; Loiseau, Christophe (2012). Passé de campagnes - Fermes et villae antiques de la Sarthe [Past of the Countryside - Farms and villae of Ancient Sarthe] (in French). CERAM Pierre Térouanne Allonnes. p. 96. ISBN 978-2-913566-53-8.
- Bouvet, Jean-Philippe (2001). Carte archéologique de la Gaule [Archaeological Map of Gaul] (in French). Paris: Académie des Inscriptions et Belles-Lettres. p. 520. ISBN 2-87754-073-1. CaG.
- Lambert, Claude; Rioufreyt, Jean (2006). "Le sanctuaire d'Aubigné-Racan (Sarthe)" [The Sanctuary of Aubigné-Racan (Sarthe)]. In Véronique Brouquier-Reddé (ed.). Actes du colloque international « Autour d'Allonnes (Sarthe), Les sanctuaires de Mars en Occident » [Proceedings of the International Conference "Around Allonnes (Sarthe), The Sanctuaries of Mars in the West"] (in French). Rennes: Presses universitaires de Rennes. pp. 223–228. ISBN 978-2-7535-0207-9.
- Bromwich, James (2014). The roman remains of Brittany, Normandy and the Loire valley [The Roman Remains of Brittany, Normandy, and the Loire Valley]. Lucina books. p. 319. ISBN 978-1-78035-662-4.
- de Cougny, Gustave (1874). "Compte-rendu de deux excursions dans le Maine" [Report of Two Excursions in Maine]. Bulletin Monumental. 5 (in French). 40: 1–17.
- Fauduet, Isabelle (1993). Les temples de tradition celtique en Gaule romaine [Celtic Tradition Temples in Roman Gaul] (in French). Paris: Errance. p. 159. ISBN 2-87772-074-8.
- Flohic, Jean-Luc (2000). Patrimoine des communes de France - La Sarthe [Heritage of the Communes of France - Sarthe] (in French). Vol. 2. Flohic. p. 1167. ISBN 2-84234-106-6.
- Golvin, Jean-Claude; Salles, Christine (2013). Le théâtre romain et ses spectacles [The Roman Theater and Its Spectacles] (in French). Lacapelle-Marival: Archéologie nouvelle. p. 152. ISBN 979-1-09145-806-1.
- Ledru, Ambroise; Vallée, Eugène (1911). Répertoire des monuments et objets anciens, préhistoriques, gallo-romains, mérovingiens et carolingiens existant ou trouvés dans les départements de la Sarthe et de la Mayenne [Directory of Ancient, Prehistoric, Gallo-Roman, Merovingian, and Carolingian Monuments and Objects Existing or Found in the Departments of Sarthe and Mayenne] (in French). Le Mans: Société historique des archives du Maine. p. 431.
- Liger, François (1903). La Cénomanie romaine, ses limites, sa capitale, ses villes mortes, ses bourgs et villages, ses voies antiques [Roman Cenomannia, Its Limits, Its Capital, Its Dead Cities, Its Towns and Villages, Its Ancient Roads] (in French). Paris and Le Mans: Champion, Monneret et de Saint-Denis. p. 390.
- Loiseau, Christophe (2009). Le métal dans l'architecture publique dans l'Ouest de la Gaule lyonnaise [Metal in Public Architecture in Western Gallia Lugdunensis] (PDF) (in French). Vol. 1. Université du Maine. p. 594.
- Maligorne, Yvan (2013). "Parure monumentale des agglomérations secondaires dans les cités de l'Ouest" [Monumental Ornamentation of Secondary Agglomerations in the Cities of the West]. In Yvan Maligorne (ed.). Aremorica 5 [Aremorica 5] (in French). CRBC - Centre de recherche bretonne et celtique. pp. 117–144.
- Malissard, Alain (2002). Les Romains et l'eau [The Romans and Water] (in French). Paris: Les Belles Lettres. p. 344. ISBN 2-251-33814-4.
- Pesche, Julien Rémy (1829). Dictionnaire topographique, historique et statistique de la Sarthe, suivi d'une biographie et d'une bibliographie [Topographic, Historical, and Statistical Dictionary of Sarthe, Followed by a Biography and Bibliography] (in French). Vol. 1. Le Mans and Paris: Monnoyer et Bachelier. p. 390.

=== External links ===
- "Aubigné-Racan" on the website of the Centre Allonnais de Prospection et de Recherches Archéologiques (CAPRA)
- "Le site de Cherré", in 100 % Sarthe, broadcast by LM TV Sarthe (October 2012)
- 3D modeling of the site by digital photogrammetry from photos taken by drone
