= Peluda =

French mythical beast

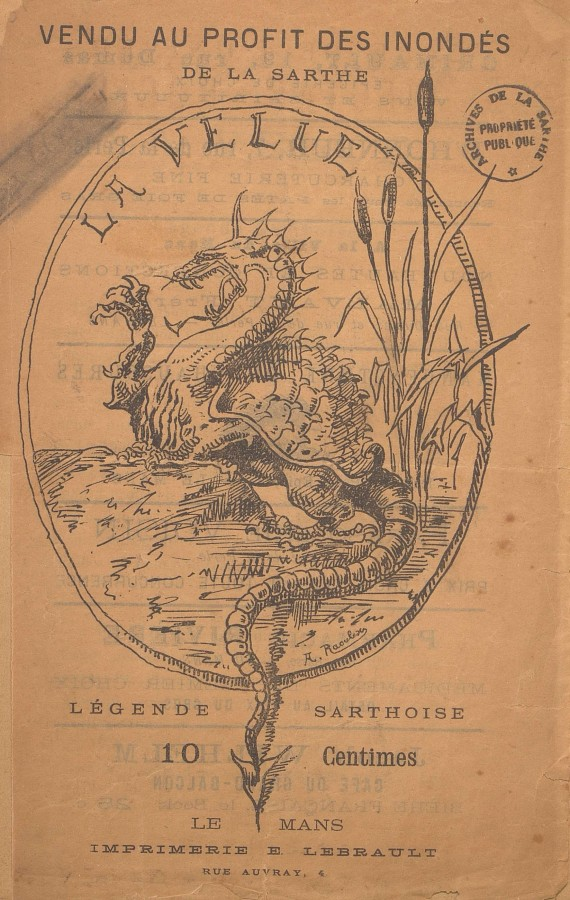
La Velue, cover of a French pamphlet (1889) — Illustration signed A. Raouleau.

The Peluda in Spanish, or La Velue ('The Hairy One') originally in French, is a mythical beast that terrorized the environs of the River Huisne, France, during the Middle Ages. It is called "The Shaggy Beast (The Hairy Beast) of La Ferté-Bernard" in English translation.

The supposed serpent-headed creature had a body covered in long green fur with poison-tipped spines protruding. It caused floods (or shot out fire from its mouth) that destroyed crops, devoured livestock and humans, and struck humans and animals dead with its tail. It was defeated after it tried to prey upon a maiden named l'Agnelle; her fiancé slew it by delivering a sword-strike to the tail, its only weak spot.

== Name ==
The velue (French, meaning ‘shaggy/hairy one’) was introduced as "la Peluda", in Spanish, in Jorge Luis Borges's Book of Imaginary Beings (1957), and translated as the "Shaggy Beast of La Ferté-Bernard" or "The Hairy Beast of La Ferté-Bernard" in English versions of the book. Borges's description compares rather closely to the that given in French by the local man of letters, Paul Cordonnier-Détrie (1954). A pamphlet of "La Velue" was printed in 1889 for the Sarthe area, and its text also gave a physical description of the mythical beast in similar language.

== Description ==
The so-called "la velue" of La Ferté-Bernard" lived on the banks of the River Huisne, and came out to terrorize the populace as far as the city of La Ferté-Bernard during the High Middle Ages, or perhaps more accurately the 15th century during the Late Middle Ages. (Note: La Velue, Légende sarthoise, Le Mans: E. Lebrault, 1889, "1889 3 p. in -8º" as according to catalog. The cover page image and a short redaction is given by the Département de Sarthe archive,: « [son] corps avait la forme d’un œuf énorme […] recouvert de longs poils verts au milieu desquels émergeaient des pointes acérées dont la piqûre était mortelle ».)

=== Physical description ===
The French sources tell that the beast was serpent-headed and serpent-tailed, ox-sized with an egg-shaped body covered in "long green fur", and "from amidst [the fur] there emerged sharp spikes endowed with deadly sting", (Note: Compare Borges who states it had a "round body". Borges's original "cubierto de un pelaje verde" doesn't state the fur is "long" (as occurs in the English), but the French original does: "recouvert de longs poils verts".) (Note: Borges's phrasing "the fur was armed with stingers whose wound was deadly" seems ambiguous. But writer Joyce Hargreaves wrote there were poisonous (porcupine-like) quills among the fur, which appears to square with the French. Carol Rose's dictionary came up with the interpretation that what appear to be fur are actually some sort of stinger-tipped tentacle-like appendages. A different source states that these poisonous stingers were something the beast could shoot off its body.) and had broad tortoise-like feet.

It was the opinion of Cordonnier-Détrie that the beast belonged to the same family as the mythical Tarasque of Tarascon and Beaucaire. Other commentators have lumped these two beasts together into a class of dragons.

=== Folklore ===
According to the lore, the beast was excluded from Noah's Ark, yet survived the Deluge, i.e., the Biblical Flood.

It later dwelled in the River Huisne, rampaging across the nearby countryside and even into the streets of the old city of La Ferté-Bernard, which for all its fortifications was defenseless against it. Striking out with its serpent-like tail, it could kill both humans and animals. It would raid sheep-folds and devour all the livestock (the sheep) within. (Note: Borges gives los establos or 'the stables'.) When chased, it retreated into the River Huisne and caused a flood, ruining the crops and bringing famine to the populace. Borges's claims that the monster "shot out flames that withered crops" is echoed by the poet Claud Roy's description that the velue "set crops on fire with its flame-throwing mouth".

It would also snatch human victims to devour, especially children and young maidens. After it captured the most virtuous maiden, named l'Agnelle ("Little Lamb"), it was finally defeated by her fiancé who took his sword and struck the tail, which was the only vulnerable point on the beast, causing immediate death. According to popular tradition, it died at the bridge of Yvré-l'Évêque. The victory was long celebrated afterwards at La Ferté-Bernard and Connerré, and the people stuffed (or embalmed) the body of the beast, so it has been told.

=== Iconography ===
A drawing of a velue is found on the cover of the aforementioned 1889 French pamphlet. Another illustration of the velue occurs in Jean Paul Ronecker's book on dragons (2004).

A terra cotta dragon dated to the 17–18th century held by the abbey of Tuffé was attached with the claim that it depict a velue; the piece was discovered in a ditch along the road to La Chapelle-Saint-Rémy. Also at Tuffé, a velue fountain has been installed in 2007, on the open square facing the Église Saint-Pierre-et-Saint-Paul. (Note: Cast bronze statue based on the sculpture by Philippe Macheret assisted by Régis Dudé.)

== In popular culture ==
The tourist office of the French commune of La Ferté-Bernard developed a game app named "Baldik", where the players can battle a velue that has returned to Perche Émeraude.

The outer shell of the final boss of SquareSoft's Chrono Trigger, Lavos, resembles the Peluda.

The Peluda also appears in The Secret Saturdays.

The velue appears in a quest from the video game Sovereign Tower.

== See also ==
- Gargouille
- Tarasque
