= Eurobot =

International robotics contest

- Formation: 2004 by Planète Sciences, La La Ferté-Bernard, VM Production
- Official language: English, French
- President: Jean-Pierre Ledey
- Website: www.eurobot.org

Eurobot is an international robotics contest dedicated to universities and robotics clubs.

== History ==
Eurobot, whose first edition took place in May 1998 in Paris was created by Nicolas Goldzahl (president of VM Productions) with the help of the association Planet Science, 4 years after the creation of the French cup of Robotics. To achieve this, in early 1997, Nicolas Goldzahl and Rachid Ait Mansour (Planet Science robotics manager) traveled across Europe to convince universities to participate in this new event. They met university leaders and showed them the videos and TV reports of the first editions of the French Robotics Cup, which already had a great success in France. A first tour in 1997 made it possible to recruit universities from Finland, Italy, Switzerland and Belgium. Many other countries joined the competition in the following years. Eurobot takes place in Europe but regularly hosts countries outside Europe (Tunisia, Algeria, Russia, Iran, Kuwait...).

Video of the beginning of the competition: VIDEO The first years of EUROBOT 1994-2000

In May 2018, 1500 students from 15 countries were involved in this science and technology contest, through its national qualifications and the international final that took place in La-Roche-Sur-Yon (France) > Video

From 2008 to 2011, Eurobot was organized in parallel with the International Conference on Research and Education in Robotics. Four books of proceedings were published, during those years, under the editorial supervision of David Obdrzálek, Achim Gottscheber, Stefan Enderle and Colin T. Schmidt.

== Summary of locations, results and themes ==
| Year | Place | Theme | 1st place | 2nd place | 3rd place | 4th place | Fair Play Prize | Link |
|---|---|---|---|---|---|---|---|---|
| 1998 | France: La Ferté-Bernard | Football | France:IUT Ville d'Avray | | | | | Archives 1998 |
| 1999 | France: La Ferté-Bernard | Castles | France:IUT Ville d'Avray | | | | | Archives 1999 |
| 2000 | France: La Ferté-Bernard | Fun Fair | France:IUT Ville d'Avray | Switzerland:EPFL | | | | Archives 2000 |
| 2001 | France: La Ferté-Bernard | Space Odyssey | France:IUT Ville d'Avray | Netherlands:Eindhoven University | Switzerland:CPLN | | | Archives 2001 |
| 2002 | France: La Ferté-Bernard | Flying Billiards | France:IUT Ville d'Avray | Algeria:Blibot | France:Minitech | | | Archives 2002 |
| 2003 | France: La Ferté-Bernard | Heads or Tails | France:X-Tech | France:D2R2 team | France:Supaéro | | | Archives 2003 |
| 2004 | France: La Ferté-Bernard | Coconut Rugby | France:Supaéro | Switzerland:Team ID/EPFL | Netherlands:Bursting Balloons | Belgium: Helb - inraci | | Archives 2004 |
| 2005 | Switzerland: Yverdon-les-Bains | Bowling | France: Microb Technology | Czech Republic: R-Team | France: RCVA | Switzerland: Autelo | | Archives 2005 |
| 2006 | Italy: Catania | Golf | France: RCVA | Netherlands: TeamDare | Serbia: BVP-M86 | Belgium: Helb - inraci | | Archives 2006 |
| 2007 | France: La Ferté-Bernard | Recycling | France: RCVA | Germany: TURAG | France: ClubElek | Belgium: Helb - inraci | | Archives 2007 |
| 2008 | Germany: Heidelberg | Mission to mars | France: RCVA | Belgium: Helb - inraci | France: ISTIA - IUT d'Angers | Spain: LSI-UC3M | Tunisia: Club Jeunes Science Monastir | Eurobot 2008 |
| 2009 | France: La Ferté-Bernard | Temples of Atlantis | France: Microb Technology | Italy: UNICT Team | Switzerland: Dynamo Rapperswil | Norway: Lost Vikings | | |
| 2010 | Switzerland: Rapperswil-Jona | Feed the world | France: RCVA | Germany: Roboterclub Aachen e.V. | Canada: ETS Montreal | France: uArt | | Eurobot 2010 |
| 2011 | Russia: Astrakhan | Chess'Up! | Austria: RRT | Italy: UNICT Team | Germany: TURAG | Switzerland: Scholar's Mate | | Eurobot 2011 |
| 2012 | France: La Ferté-Bernard | Treasure Island | France: RCVA | France: Space Crackers | Serbia: Memristor | Serbia: μLy | | Eurobot 2012 |
| 2013 | France: La Ferté-Bernard | Happy Birthday | France: Université d'Angers | France: RCVA | Germany: Roboterclub Aachen e.V. | Belgium: Montefiore Team | | Eurobot 2013 |
| 2014 | Germany: Dresden | Prehistobot | France: RCVA | France: μART Alsace | Russia: DIMrobotics | Germany: DROF | | Eurobot 2014 |
| 2015 | Switzerland: Yverdon-les-Bains | Robomovies | France: RCVA | Germany: Roboterclub Aachen e.V. | Switzerland: BlackJacks | Serbia: μ | | Eurobot 2015 |
| 2016 | France: Le Kremlin-Bicêtre | The Beach Bots | France: RCVA | Serbia: MBS | Serbia: M41+ | Switzerland: RCR | | Eurobot 2016 |
| 2017 | France: La Roche-sur-Yon | Moon Village | France: RCVA | Serbia: M41+ | France: A.I.G.R.I.S. Birds | Belgium: Bot l'Éclair | | Eurobot 2017 |
| 2018 | France: La Roche-sur-Yon | Robot Cities | Belgium : Les 7 Mons'quetaires [archive] | Algeria : Polybot | France : Robotech Legends | Serbia: Memristor | | Eurobot 2018 |
| 2019 | France: La Roche-sur-Yon | Atom factory | Serbia: PMG Robotics | Russia: Reset | Romania: CyberTech | Switzerland: E-Robot | | Eurobot 2019 |
| 2020 | Canceled | Sail the World | | | | | | Eurobot 2020 |
| 2021 | | Sail the World | | | | | | Eurobot 2021 |
| 2022 | France: La Roche-sur-Yon | Age of bots | Serbia: μ | Austria: TeamDynamics | France: ESEO-ANGERS | Republic of China (Taiwan): DIT Robotics | | Eurobot 2022 |
| 2023 | France: La Roche-sur-Yon | The Cherry On The Cake | France: RCVA | France: VRAC | Switzerland:TeamAuto | Serbia: Memristor | | Eurobot 2023 |
| 2024 | France: La Roche-sur-Yon | Farming Mars | Belgium: UCLouvain - BotAnnick | Serbia: μ | Austria: TeamDynamics | Belgium:MONS'TELLAIRE | | Eurobot 2024 |
| 2025 | France: La Roche-sur-Yon | The Show Must Go On | Austria: TeamDynamics | Greece: Hyperion Robotics | France: VRAC | France: RCVA | | Eurobot 2025 |
| 2026 | France: La Roche-sur-Yon | Winter Is Coming | Greece: Hyperion Robotics | Taiwan: DIT Robotics | Serbia: Memristor Robotics | Germany: TURAG | | Eurobot 2026 |

== See also ==
- Robot
