= Saint-Martin-du-Mont =

Saint-Martin-du-Mont is the name of 3 communes in France:

- Saint-Martin-du-Mont, in the Ain department
- Saint-Martin-du-Mont, in the Côte-d'Or department
- Saint-Martin-du-Mont, in the Saône-et-Loire department

== See also ==
- Saint-Martin-des-Monts, in the Sarthe department
