= Saint-Hilaire-le-Lierru =

- Part of Tuffé-Val-de-la-Chéronne
- Location of Saint-Hilaire-le-Lierru
- Location within France Location within Pays de la Loire
- Coordinates: 48°06′33″N 0°32′17″E
- Country: France
- Region: Pays de la Loire
- Department: Sarthe
- Arrondissement: Mamers
- Canton: La Ferté-Bernard
- Commune: Tuffé-Val-de-la-Chéronne
- Area^{1}: 4.5 km^{2} (1.7 sq mi)
- Highest elevation: 120 m (390 ft)
- Lowest elevation: 70 m (230 ft)
- Population (2018): 132
  - Density: 29/km^{2} (76/sq mi)
- Demonym(s): Saint-Hilairien, Saint-Hilairiennes; Saint-Hilairois, Saint-Hilairoise
- Time zone: UTC+01:00 (CET)
  - Summer (DST): UTC+02:00 (CEST)
- Postal code: 72160
- ^{1} French Land Register data, which excludes lakes, ponds, glaciers > 1 km^{2} (0.386 sq mi or 247 acres) and river estuaries.

Saint-Hilaire-le-Lierru is a former commune in the Sarthe department in the region of Pays de la Loire in north-western France. On 1 January 2016, it was merged into the new commune of Tuffé-Val-de-la-Chéronne. Its population was 132 in 2019.

== See also ==
- Communes of the Sarthe department
