= French Cup (disambiguation) =

French Cup or Coupe de France may refer to:

- Coupe de France, a French men's football competition
- Coupe de France Féminine, a French women's football competition
- Coupe de France (rugby union), a French rugby union competition
- Coupe de France Lord Derby, a French rugby league competition
- Coupe de France (ice hockey), a French ice hockey competition
- Coupe de France (handball), a French men's handball competition
- Coupe de France (women's handball), a French women's handball competition
- Coupe de France de Para Rugby XIII, a French wheelchair rugby league competition
- Coupe de France de robotique, a French robotics competition
- French Cup (synchronized skating), a synchronized skating competition held in Rouen, France
- French Road Cycling Cup, a French road bicycle racing competition
