= Cherreau =

- Part of Cherré-Au
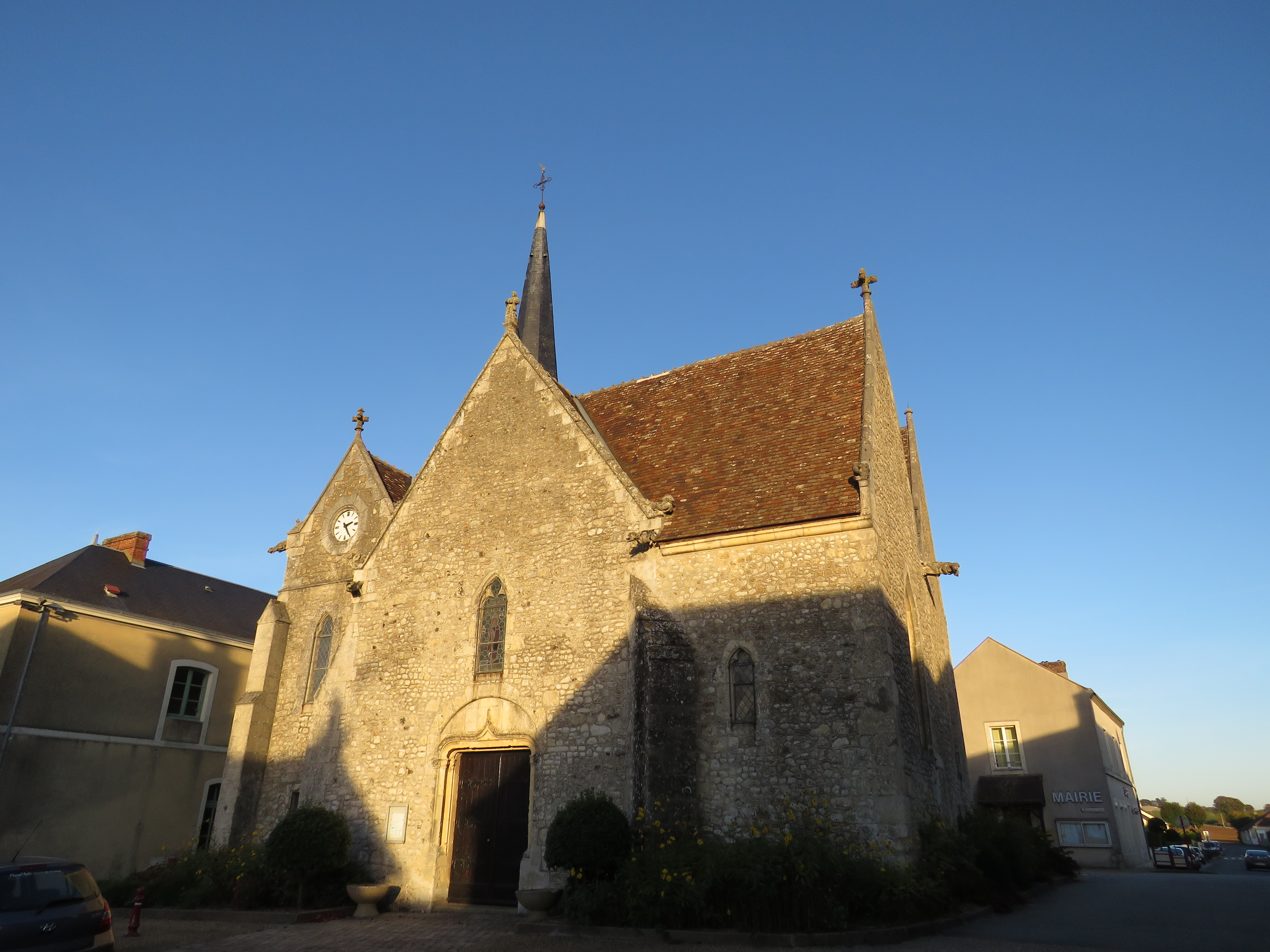
- The church of Saint-Symphorien
- Location of Cherreau
- Location within France Location within Pays de la Loire
- Coordinates: 48°11′30″N 0°41′00″E
- Country: France
- Region: Pays de la Loire
- Department: Sarthe
- Arrondissement: Mamers
- Canton: La Ferté-Bernard
- Commune: Cherré-Au
- Area^{1}: 11.3 km^{2} (4.4 sq mi)
- Population (2022): 891
  - Density: 78.8/km^{2} (204/sq mi)
- Demonym(s): Cherreausien, Cherreausienne
- Time zone: UTC+01:00 (CET)
  - Summer (DST): UTC+02:00 (CEST)
- Postal code: 72400
- ^{1} French Land Register data, which excludes lakes, ponds, glaciers > 1 km^{2} (0.386 sq mi or 247 acres) and river estuaries.

Cherreau (French pronunciation: [ʃɛʁo]) is a former commune in the Sarthe department in the Pays de la Loire region in north-western France. On January 1, 2019, it was merged into the new commune Cherré-Au.

== See also ==
- Communes of the Sarthe department
