= Lombron Airfield =

Lombron Airfield Advanced Landing Ground A-37

- Lombron Airfield (France)

Site information
- Type: Military Airfield
- Controlled by: United States Army Air Forces

Location
- Coordinates: 48°05′54″N 000°27′11″E

Site history
- In use: 1944
- Battles/wars: Western Front (World War II)

Lombron Airfield is a former World War II airfield, located 1.0 km south-southwest of La Chapelle-Saint-Rémy in the Pays de la Loire region, France.

== History ==
Lombron Airfield was built between 18 August and 3 September 1944 by the 834th Engineer Aviation Battalion, IX Engineering Command.

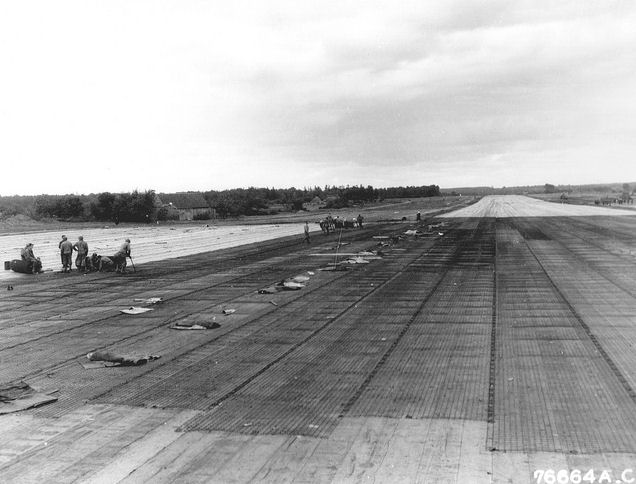
Construction of Lombron Airfield (A-37), France, 1944.

The airfield was established as an Emergency Landing/Refueling Airfield; however, it was not heavily used but one unit temporarily settled at the base: the P-47 Thunderbolts of the 405th Fighter Group. Although the airfield was not finished yet, advance parties of the Group was sent there with the remainder sent to Cretteville Airfield (A-14) on 25 August. The P-47s remained at the airfield until 13 September 1944, when the much better equipped former Luftwaffe airfield, Saint-Dizier–Robinson (A-64) became available.

The airfield was abandoned by the end of the month and returned to agricultural use. Nothing remains of the former airfield.
