= Cherré, Sarthe =

Cherré
- Part of Cherré-Au
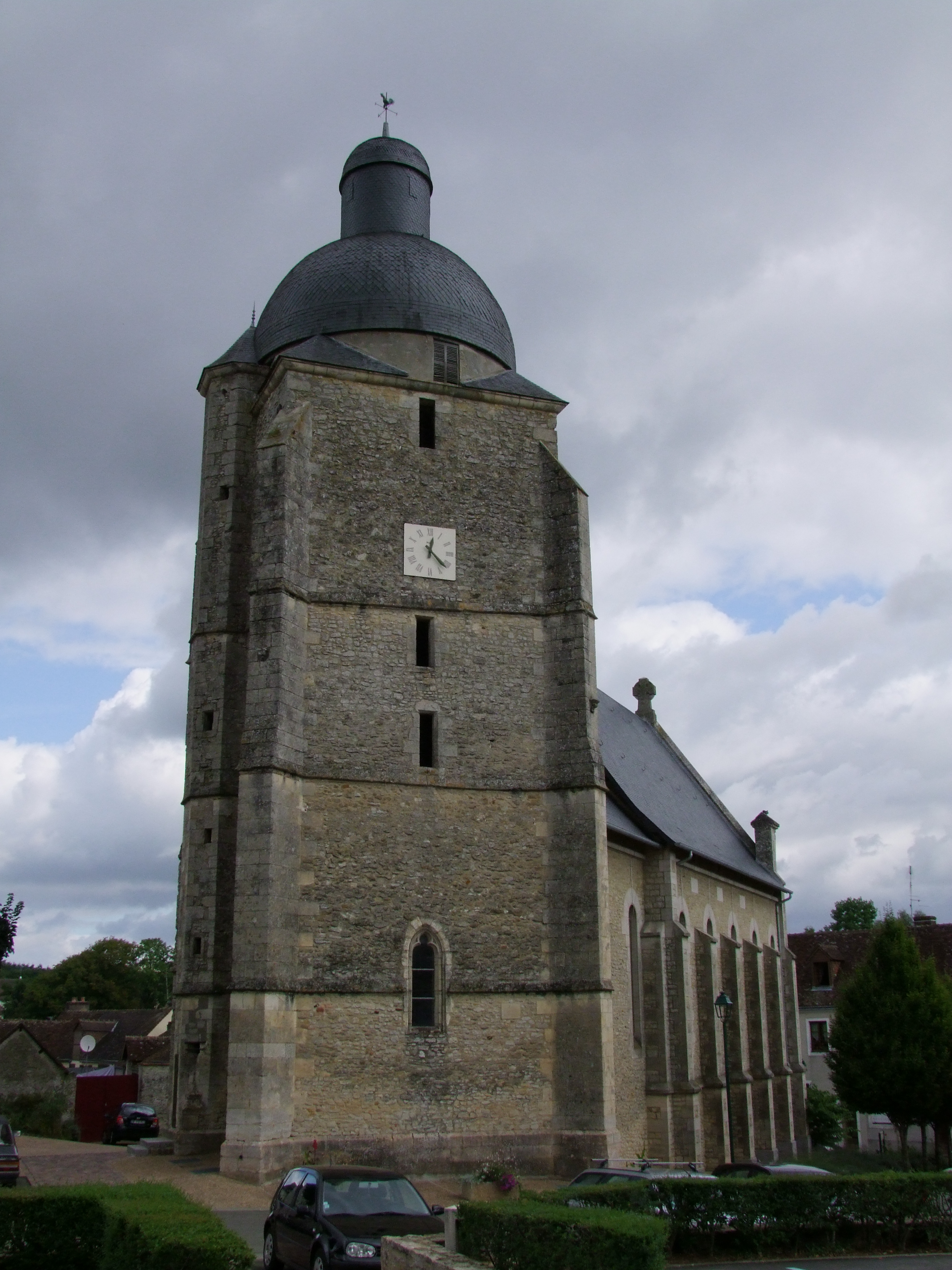
- The church of Saint Pierre and Saint Paul
- Location of Cherré
- Location within France Location within Pays de la Loire
- Coordinates: 48°10′20″N 0°39′25″E
- Country: France
- Region: Pays de la Loire
- Department: Sarthe
- Arrondissement: Mamers
- Canton: La Ferté-Bernard
- Commune: Cherré-Au
- Area^{1}: 18.73 km^{2} (7.23 sq mi)
- Highest elevation: 131 m (430 ft)
- Lowest elevation: 78 m (256 ft)
- Population (2022): 1,855
  - Density: 99.04/km^{2} (256.5/sq mi)
- Demonym(s): Cherréen, Cherréenne
- Time zone: UTC+01:00 (CET)
  - Summer (DST): UTC+02:00 (CEST)
- Postal code: 72400
- ^{1} French Land Register data, which excludes lakes, ponds, glaciers > 1 km^{2} (0.386 sq mi or 247 acres) and river estuaries.

Cherré (French pronunciation: [ʃɛʁe]) is a former commune in the Sarthe department in the Pays de la Loire region in north-western France. On 1 January 2019, it was merged into the new commune Cherré-Au.

== See also ==
- Communes of the Sarthe department
