= Cherré-Au =

- Commune
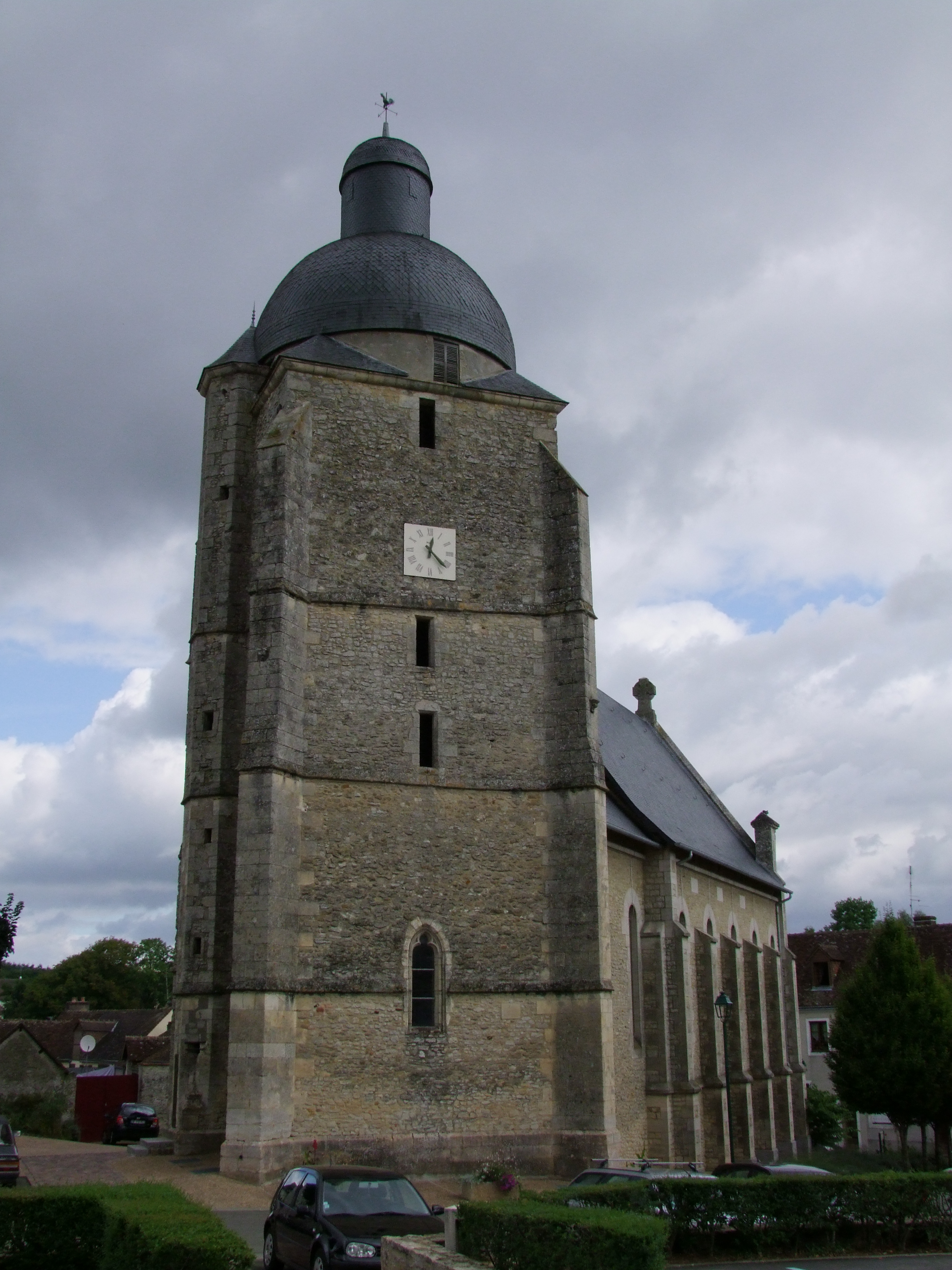
- The church of Saint Pierre and Saint Paul in Cherré
- Location of Cherré-Au
- Location within France Location within Pays de la Loire
- Coordinates: 48°10′20″N 0°39′25″E
- Country: France
- Region: Pays de la Loire
- Department: Sarthe
- Arrondissement: Mamers
- Canton: La Ferté-Bernard
- Intercommunality: CC du Perche Emeraude

Government
  - Mayor (2020–2026): Jannick Niel
- Area^{1}: 30.37 km^{2} (11.73 sq mi)
- Highest elevation: 189 m (620 ft)
- Lowest elevation: 78 m (256 ft)
- Population (2023): 2,758
  - Density: 90.81/km^{2} (235.2/sq mi)
- Time zone: UTC+01:00 (CET)
  - Summer (DST): UTC+02:00 (CEST)
- INSEE/Postal code: 72080 /72400
- ^{1} French Land Register data, which excludes lakes, ponds, glaciers > 1 km^{2} (0.386 sq mi or 247 acres) and river estuaries.

Cherré-Au (French pronunciation: [ʃɛʁe o]) is a commune in the Sarthe department in the Pays de la Loire region in north-western France. It was established on 1 January 2019 by merger of the former communes of Cherré (the seat) and Cherreau.

== Population ==
Population data refer to the area corresponding with the commune as of January 2025.

Historical population
Year	Pop.	±% p.a.
1968	936	—
1975	1,080	+2.07%
1982	1,633	+6.08%
1990	1,914	+2.00%
1999	2,011	+0.55%
2007	2,425	+2.37%
2012	2,634	+1.67%
2017	2,698	+0.48%
2023	2,758	+0.37%
Source: INSEE

== See also ==
- Communes of the Sarthe department
