= Pierre-Roland-François Butet de La Sarthe =

Pierre-Roland-François Butet de La Sarthe (16 November 1769, Tuffé – 15 January 1825, Paris) was a French grammarian and lexicographer.

A member of the Société des observateurs de l'homme, he was also a resident member of the Société des Antiquaires de France.

== Works ==
- 1801: Abrégé d'un cours complet de lexicologie à l'usage des élèves de la quatrième classe de l'école polymathique… Read online.
- 1801: Abrégé d'un cours complet de lexicographie, à l'usage des élèves de la cinquième classe de l'Ecole polymathique Read online.
- 1821: Mémoire historique et critique, dans lequel l'S se plaint des irruptions orthographiques de l'X, qui l'a supplantée dans plusieurs cas, sans aucune autorisation ni étymologique, ni analogique; à MM. les membres de l'Académie française et de celle des Inscriptions et belles-lettres.

== Sources ==
- Annales de l'Académie de Mâcon, Mâcon, L'Académie, 1905, (p. 79).
