= Avezé =

- Commune
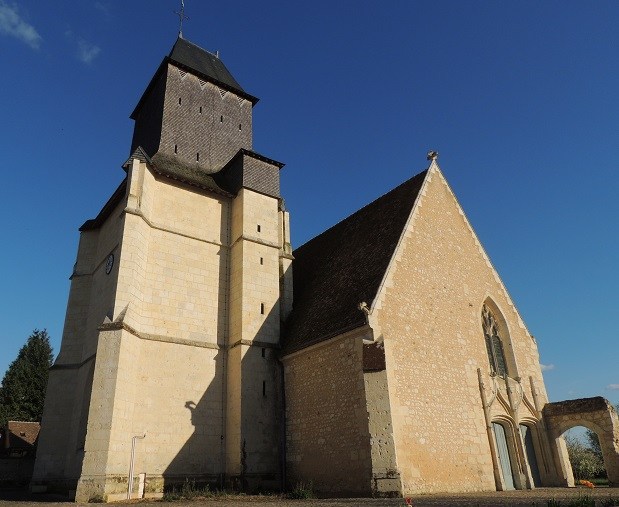
- The church of Saint-Pierre, in Avezé
- Location of Avezé
- Location within France Location within Pays de la Loire
- Coordinates: 48°13′40″N 0°40′41″E
- Country: France
- Region: Pays de la Loire
- Department: Sarthe
- Arrondissement: Mamers
- Canton: La Ferté-Bernard
- Intercommunality: CC du Perche Emeraude

Government
  - Mayor (2020–2026): Pierre Boulard
- Area^{1}: 20.81 km^{2} (8.03 sq mi)
- Highest elevation: 189 m (620 ft)
- Lowest elevation: 85 m (279 ft)
- Population (2023): 690
  - Density: 33/km^{2} (86/sq mi)
- Demonym(s): Avezéen, Avezéenne
- Time zone: UTC+01:00 (CET)
  - Summer (DST): UTC+02:00 (CEST)
- INSEE/Postal code: 72020 /72400
- ^{1} French Land Register data, which excludes lakes, ponds, glaciers > 1 km^{2} (0.386 sq mi or 247 acres) and river estuaries.

Avezé (French pronunciation: [avze]; anc. Abaci-aco) is a commune in the Sarthe department in the region of Pays de la Loire in north-western France.

== See also ==
- Communes of the Sarthe department
