= Souvigné-sur-Même =

- Commune
- Location of Souvigné-sur-Même
- Location within France Location within Pays de la Loire
- Coordinates: 48°13′12″N 0°38′20″E
- Country: France
- Region: Pays de la Loire
- Department: Sarthe
- Arrondissement: Mamers
- Canton: La Ferté-Bernard
- Intercommunality: CC du Perche Emeraude

Government
  - Mayor (2020–2026): Laëtitia Veegaert
- Area^{1}: 6.5 km^{2} (2.5 sq mi)
- Highest elevation: 170 m (560 ft)
- Lowest elevation: 82 m (269 ft)
- Population (2023): 164
  - Density: 25/km^{2} (65/sq mi)
- Time zone: UTC+01:00 (CET)
  - Summer (DST): UTC+02:00 (CEST)
- INSEE/Postal code: 72342 /72400
- ^{1} French Land Register data, which excludes lakes, ponds, glaciers > 1 km^{2} (0.386 sq mi or 247 acres) and river estuaries.

Souvigné-sur-Même is a commune in the Sarthe department in the region of Pays de la Loire in north-western France.

== See also ==
- Communes of the Sarthe department
