= Préval =

- Commune
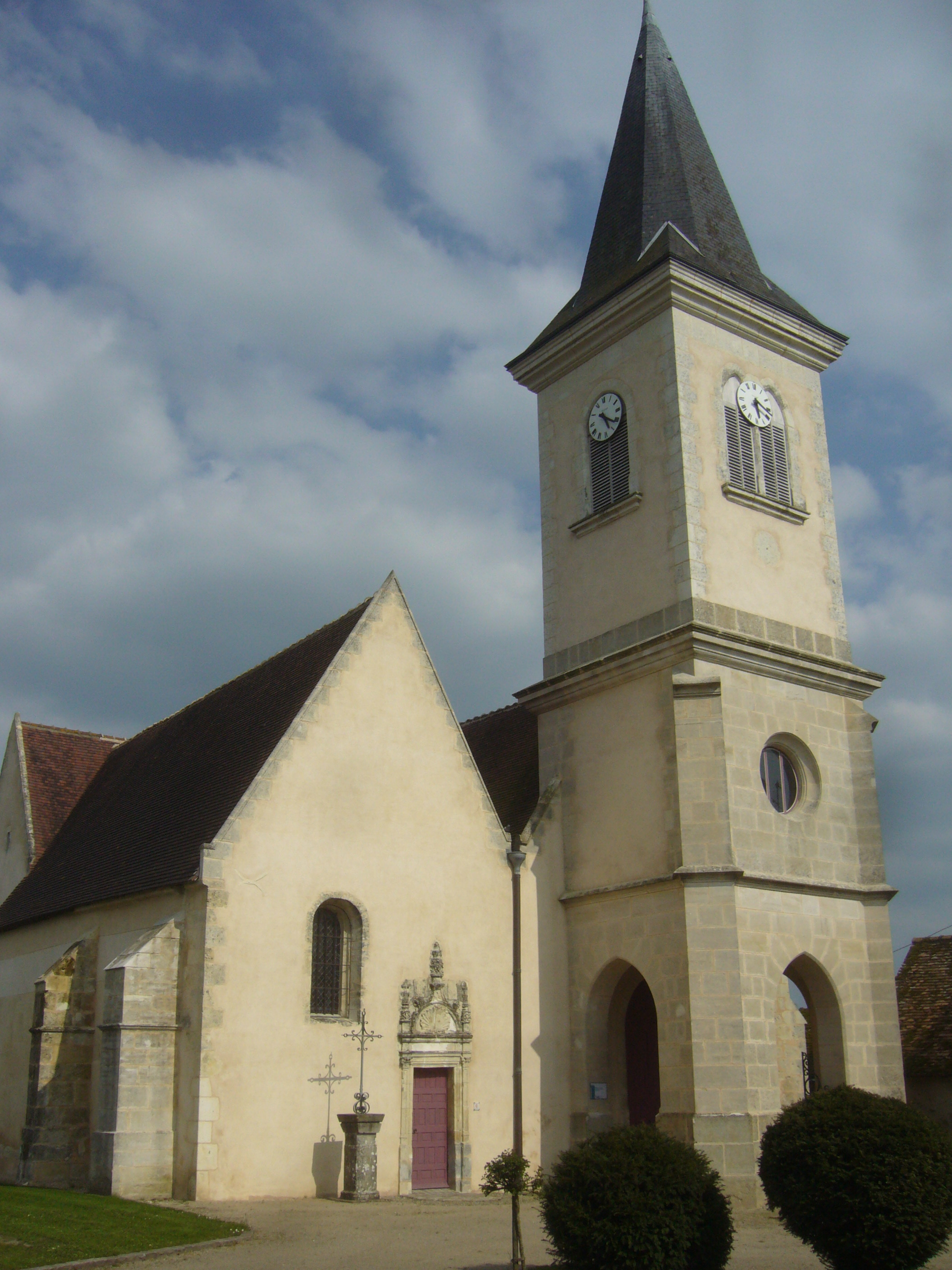
- The church of Saint-Pierre and Saint-Paul
- Location of Préval
- Location within France Location within Pays de la Loire
- Coordinates: 48°14′02″N 0°37′27″E
- Country: France
- Region: Pays de la Loire
- Department: Sarthe
- Arrondissement: Mamers
- Canton: La Ferté-Bernard
- Intercommunality: CC du Perche Emeraude

Government
  - Mayor (2020–2026): José Plans
- Area^{1}: 7.62 km^{2} (2.94 sq mi)
- Highest elevation: 158 m (518 ft)
- Lowest elevation: 87 m (285 ft)
- Population (2023): 656
  - Density: 86.1/km^{2} (223/sq mi)
- Demonym(s): Prévalois, Prévaloise
- Time zone: UTC+01:00 (CET)
  - Summer (DST): UTC+02:00 (CEST)
- INSEE/Postal code: 72245 /72400
- ^{1} French Land Register data, which excludes lakes, ponds, glaciers > 1 km^{2} (0.386 sq mi or 247 acres) and river estuaries.

Préval (French pronunciation: [pʁeval]) is a commune in the Sarthe department in the region of Pays de la Loire in north-western France.

== See also ==
- Communes of the Sarthe department
