= Prévelles =

- Commune
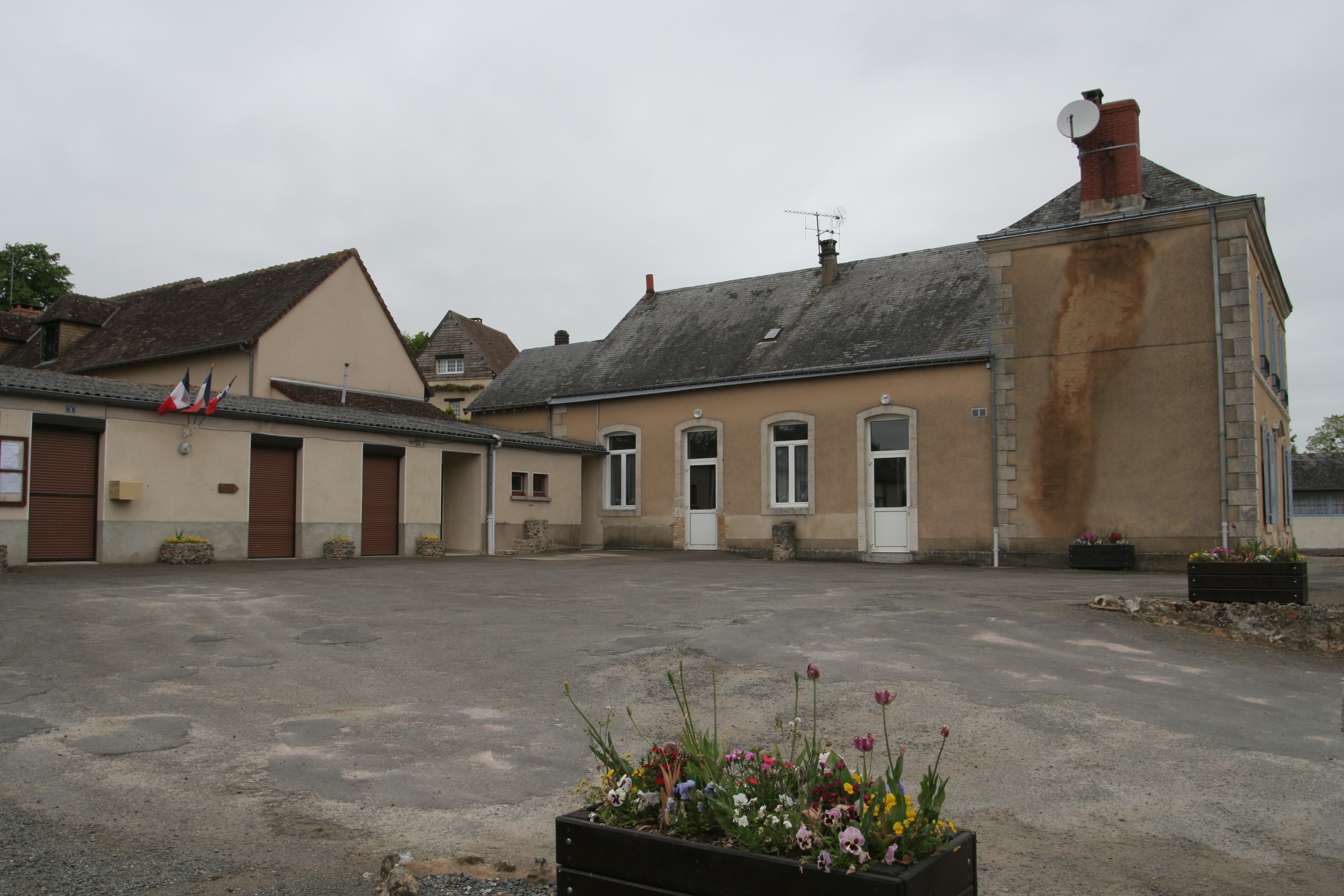
- The town hall of Prévelles
- Location of Prévelles
- Location within France Location within Pays de la Loire
- Coordinates: 48°09′05″N 0°28′58″E
- Country: France
- Region: Pays de la Loire
- Department: Sarthe
- Arrondissement: Mamers
- Canton: La Ferté-Bernard
- Intercommunality: CC du Perche Emeraude

Government
  - Mayor (2020–2026): Roland Marcotte
- Area^{1}: 4.81 km^{2} (1.86 sq mi)
- Highest elevation: 158 m (518 ft)
- Lowest elevation: 105 m (344 ft)
- Population (2023): 188
  - Density: 39.1/km^{2} (101/sq mi)
- Demonym(s): Prévellois, Prévelloise
- Time zone: UTC+01:00 (CET)
  - Summer (DST): UTC+02:00 (CEST)
- INSEE/Postal code: 72246 /72110
- ^{1} French Land Register data, which excludes lakes, ponds, glaciers > 1 km^{2} (0.386 sq mi or 247 acres) and river estuaries.

Prévelles (French pronunciation: [pʁevɛl]) is a commune in the Sarthe department in the region of Pays de la Loire in north-western France.

== See also ==
- Communes of the Sarthe department
