= Bouër =

- Commune
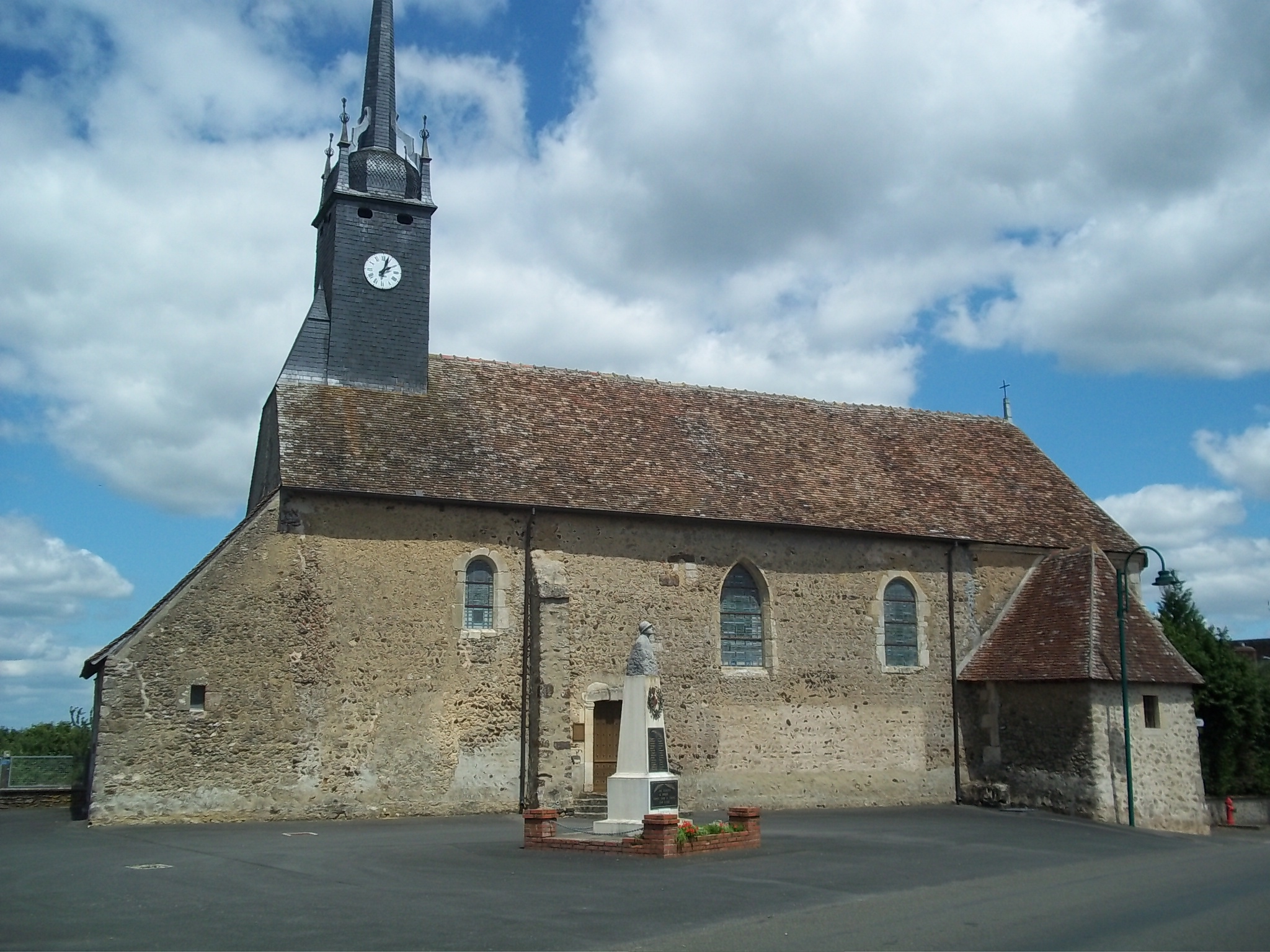
- The church of Saint-Pierre
- Location of Bouër
- Location within France Location within Pays de la Loire
- Coordinates: 48°04′56″N 0°37′47″E
- Country: France
- Region: Pays de la Loire
- Department: Sarthe
- Arrondissement: Mamers
- Canton: La Ferté-Bernard
- Intercommunality: CC du Perche Emeraude

Government
  - Mayor (2022–2026): Serge Auger
- Area^{1}: 12 km^{2} (4.6 sq mi)
- Highest elevation: 192 m (630 ft)
- Lowest elevation: 85 m (279 ft)
- Population (2023): 350
  - Density: 29/km^{2} (76/sq mi)
- Demonym(s): Bouëriens, Bouërienne
- Time zone: UTC+01:00 (CET)
  - Summer (DST): UTC+02:00 (CEST)
- INSEE/Postal code: 72041 /72390
- ^{1} French Land Register data, which excludes lakes, ponds, glaciers > 1 km^{2} (0.386 sq mi or 247 acres) and river estuaries.

Bouër is a commune in the Sarthe department in the region of Pays de la Loire in north-western France.

== See also ==
- Communes of the Sarthe department
