= Villaines-la-Gonais =

- Commune
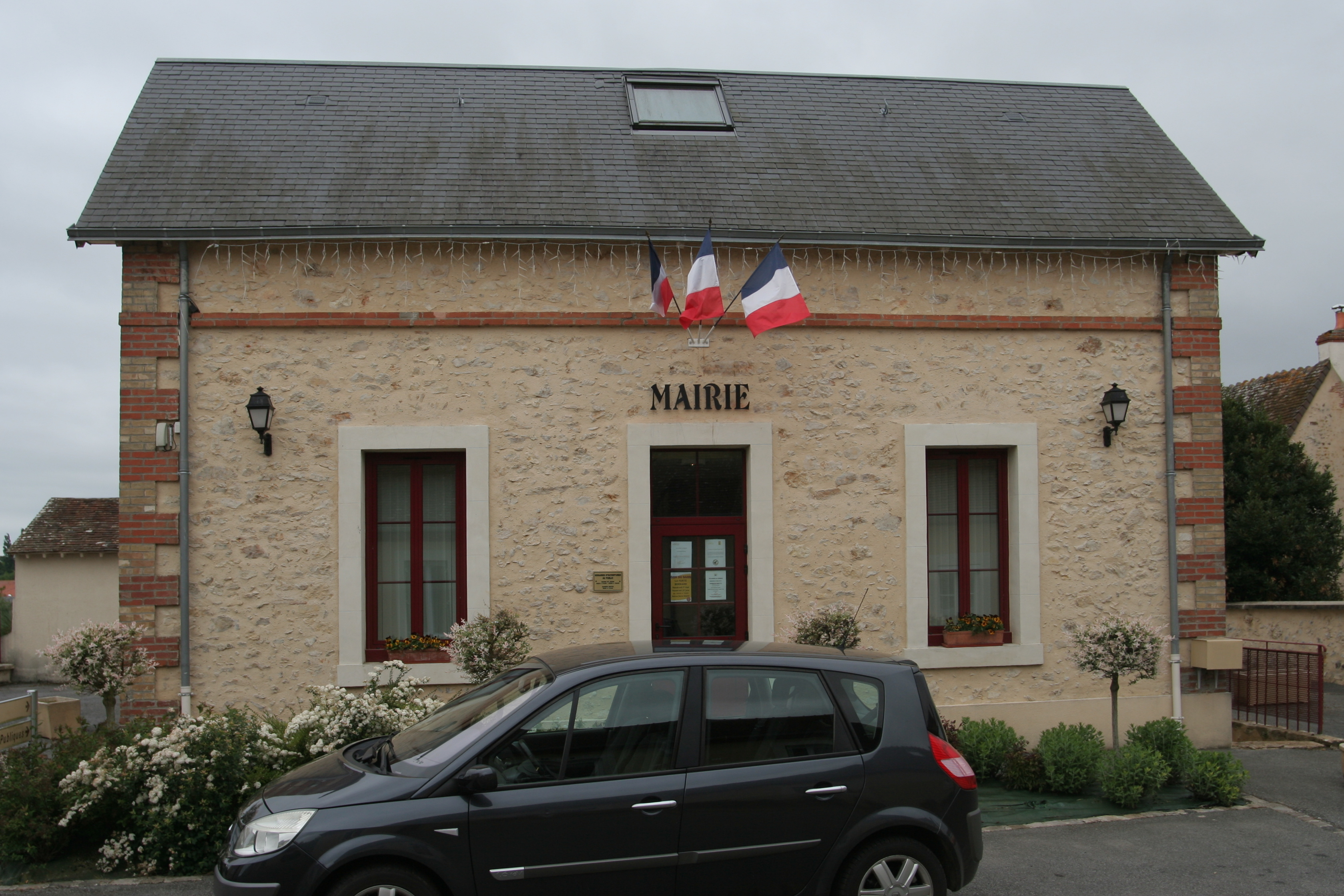
- The town hall of Villaines-la-Gonais
- Location of Villaines-la-Gonais
- Location within France Location within Pays de la Loire
- Coordinates: 48°08′05″N 0°36′06″E
- Country: France
- Region: Pays de la Loire
- Department: Sarthe
- Arrondissement: Mamers
- Canton: La Ferté-Bernard
- Intercommunality: CC du Perche Emeraude

Government
  - Mayor (2020–2026): Michel Odeau
- Area^{1}: 10.4 km^{2} (4.0 sq mi)
- Population (2023): 510
  - Density: 49/km^{2} (130/sq mi)
- Demonym(s): Villainois, Villainoise
- Time zone: UTC+01:00 (CET)
  - Summer (DST): UTC+02:00 (CEST)
- INSEE/Postal code: 72375 /72400
- ^{1} French Land Register data, which excludes lakes, ponds, glaciers > 1 km^{2} (0.386 sq mi or 247 acres) and river estuaries.

Villaines-la-Gonais (French pronunciation: [vilɛn la ɡɔnɛ]) is a commune in the Sarthe department in the region of Pays de la Loire in north-western France.

== See also ==
- Communes of the Sarthe department
