= La Chapelle-du-Bois =

- Commune
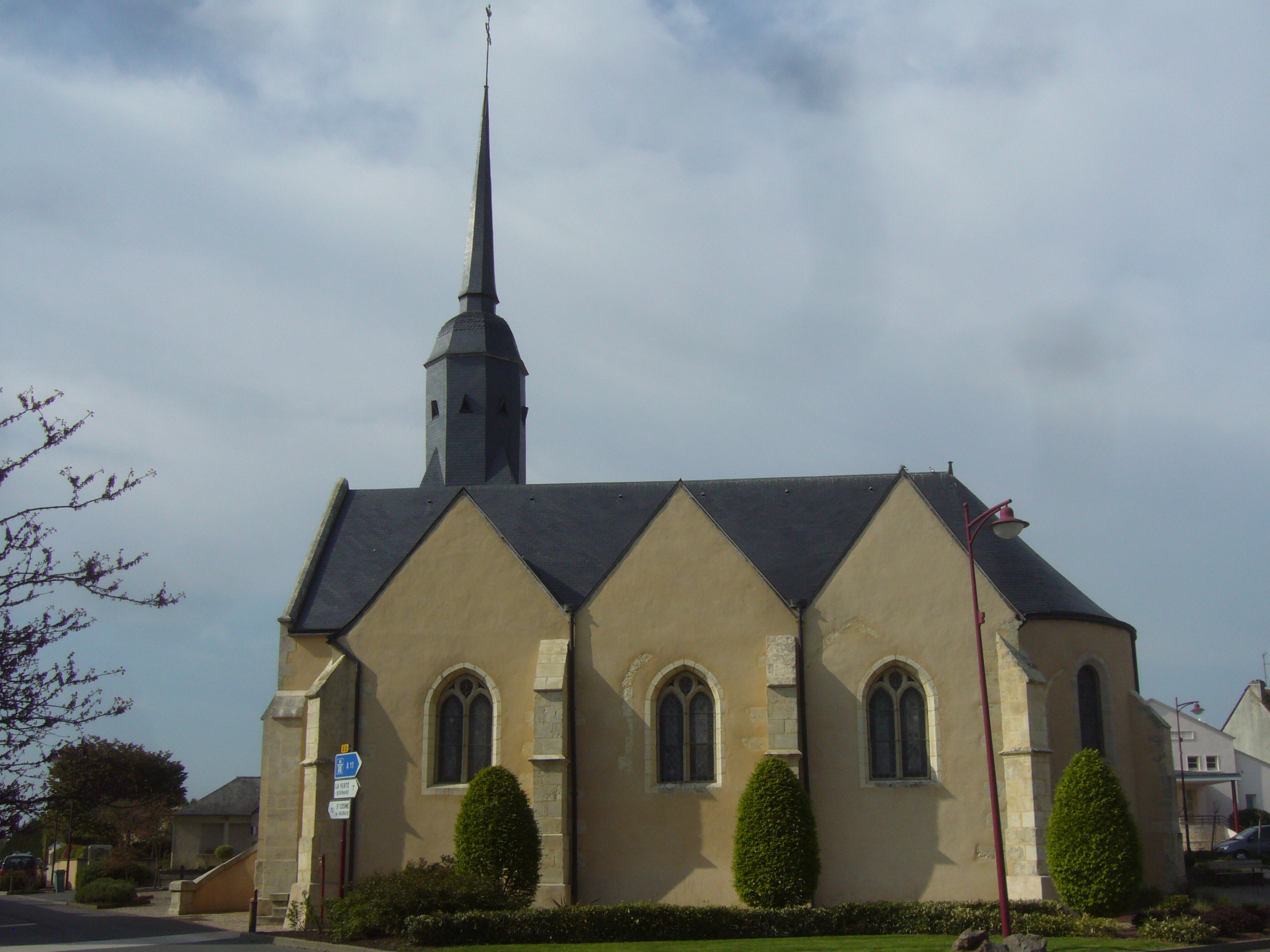
- The church of Sainte-Marie-Madeleine
- Location of La Chapelle-du-Bois
- Location within France Location within Pays de la Loire
- Coordinates: 48°13′13″N 0°35′37″E
- Country: France
- Region: Pays de la Loire
- Department: Sarthe
- Arrondissement: Mamers
- Canton: La Ferté-Bernard
- Intercommunality: CC du Perche Emeraude

Government
  - Mayor (2020–2026): Pascal Bourgoin
- Area^{1}: 16.53 km^{2} (6.38 sq mi)
- Highest elevation: 156 m (512 ft)
- Population (2023): 768
  - Density: 46.5/km^{2} (120/sq mi)
- Demonym(s): Chapellois, Chapelloise
- Time zone: UTC+01:00 (CET)
  - Summer (DST): UTC+02:00 (CEST)
- INSEE/Postal code: 72062 /72400
- ^{1} French Land Register data, which excludes lakes, ponds, glaciers > 1 km^{2} (0.386 sq mi or 247 acres) and river estuaries.

La Chapelle-du-Bois (French pronunciation: [la ʃapɛl dy bwa]) is a commune in the Sarthe department in the Pays de la Loire region in north-western France.

== See also ==
- Communes of the Sarthe department
