= Saint-Aubin-des-Coudrais =

- Commune
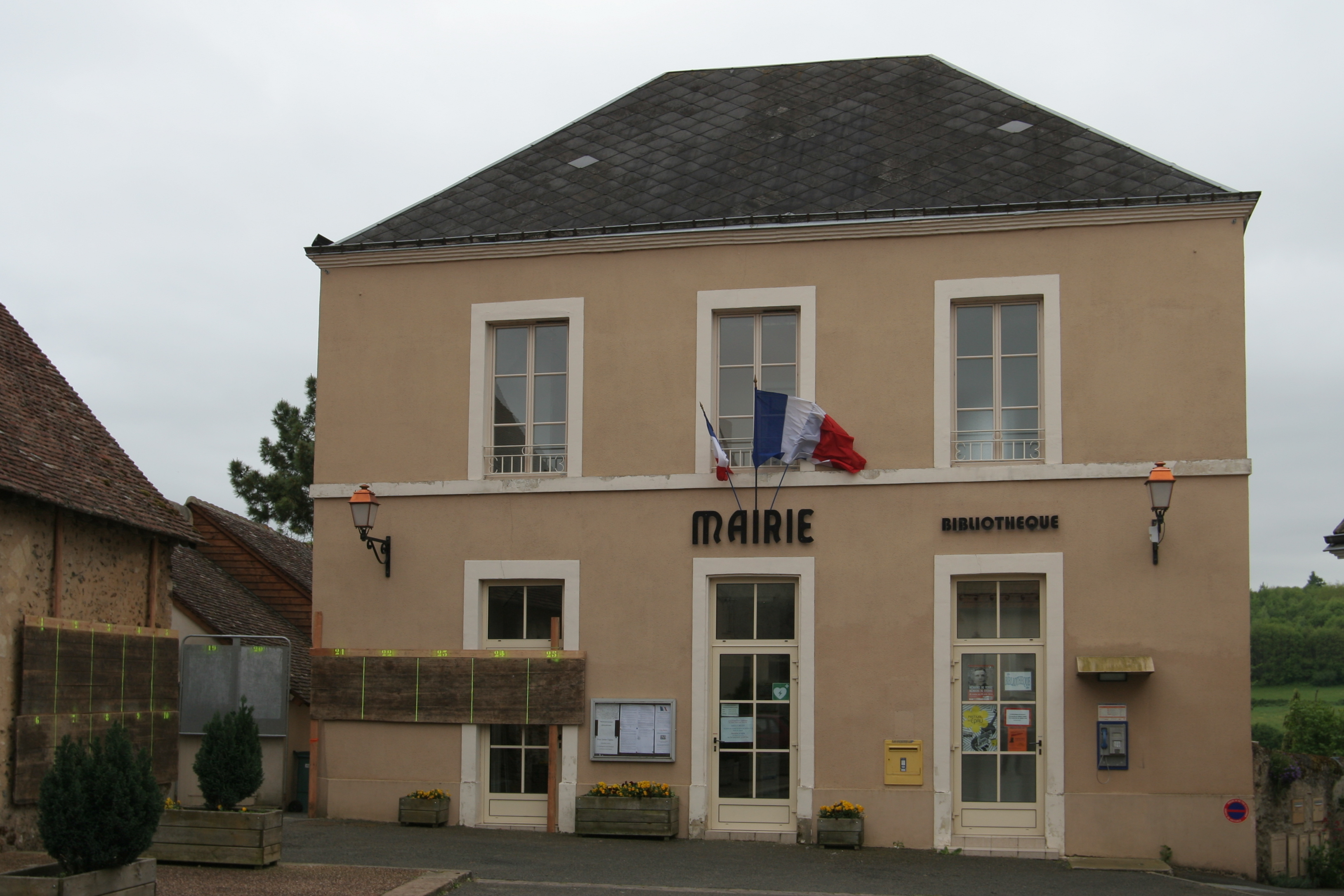
- The town hall of Saint-Aubin-des-Coudrais
- Location of Saint-Aubin-des-Coudrais
- Location within France Location within Pays de la Loire
- Coordinates: 48°10′21″N 0°35′15″E
- Country: France
- Region: Pays de la Loire
- Department: Sarthe
- Arrondissement: Mamers
- Canton: La Ferté-Bernard
- Intercommunality: CC du Perche Emeraude

Government
  - Mayor (2020–2026): Michèle Legesne
- Area^{1}: 17.4 km^{2} (6.7 sq mi)
- Population (2023): 890
  - Density: 51/km^{2} (130/sq mi)
- Demonym(s): Saint-Aubinois, Saint-Aubinoise
- Time zone: UTC+01:00 (CET)
  - Summer (DST): UTC+02:00 (CEST)
- INSEE/Postal code: 72267 /72400
- ^{1} French Land Register data, which excludes lakes, ponds, glaciers > 1 km^{2} (0.386 sq mi or 247 acres) and river estuaries.

Saint-Aubin-des-Coudrais (French pronunciation: [sɛ̃.t‿obɛ̃ de kudʁɛ]) is a commune in the Sarthe department in the region of Pays de la Loire in north-western France.

== See also ==
- Communes of the Sarthe department
