= Théligny =

- Commune
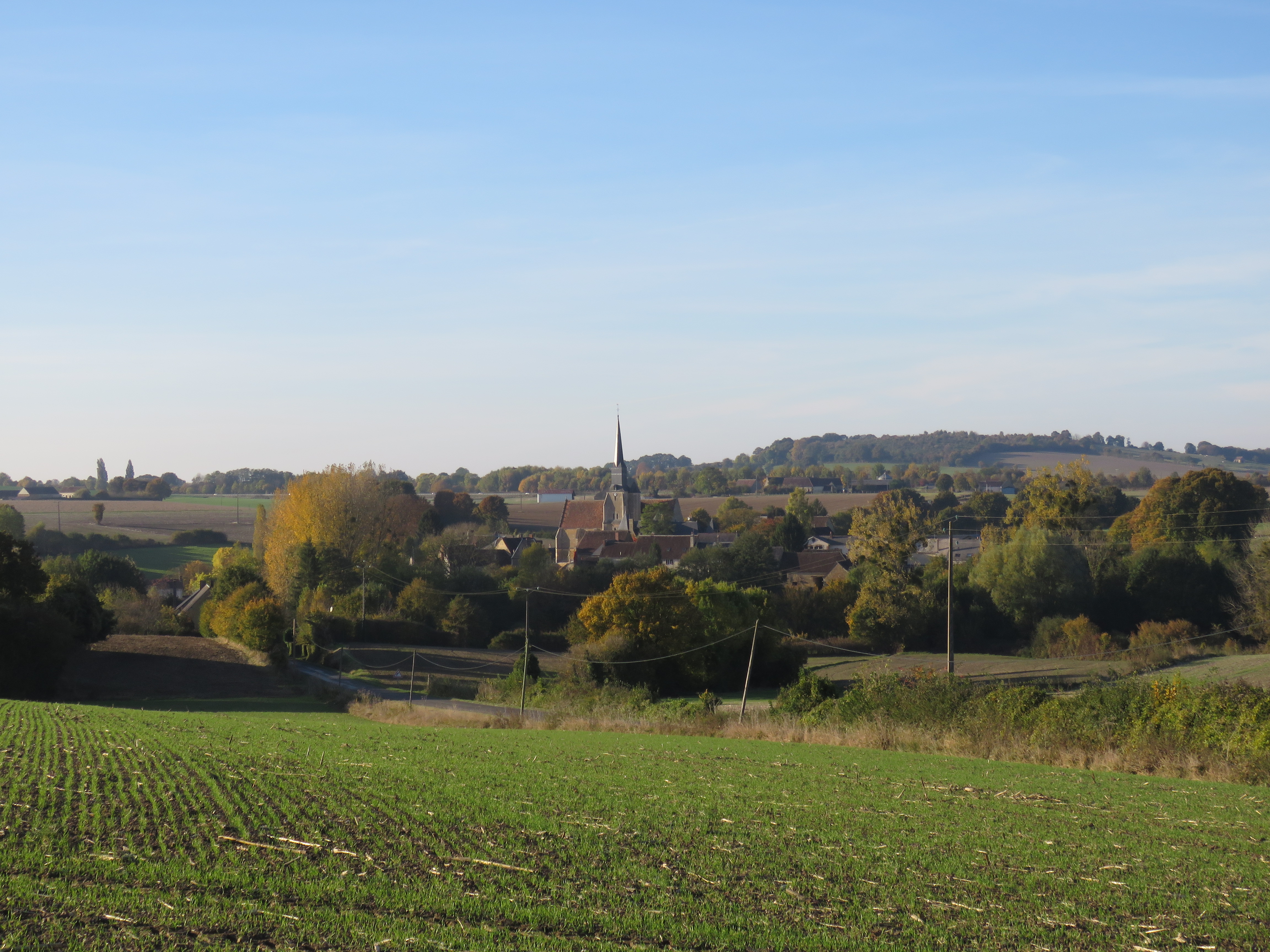
- A general view of Théligny
- Location of Théligny
- Location within France Location within Pays de la Loire
- Coordinates: 48°10′30″N 0°48′00″E
- Country: France
- Region: Pays de la Loire
- Department: Sarthe
- Arrondissement: Mamers
- Canton: La Ferté-Bernard
- Intercommunality: CC du Perche Emeraude

Government
  - Mayor (2020–2026): Willy Pauvert
- Area^{1}: 14.5 km^{2} (5.6 sq mi)
- Population (2023): 215
  - Density: 14.8/km^{2} (38.4/sq mi)
- Demonym(s): Thélignois, Thélignoise
- Time zone: UTC+01:00 (CET)
  - Summer (DST): UTC+02:00 (CEST)
- INSEE/Postal code: 72353 /72320
- ^{1} French Land Register data, which excludes lakes, ponds, glaciers > 1 km^{2} (0.386 sq mi or 247 acres) and river estuaries.

Théligny (French pronunciation: [teliɲi]) is a commune in the Sarthe department in the region of Pays de la Loire in north-western France.

== See also ==
- Communes of the Sarthe department
