= Duneau =

- Commune
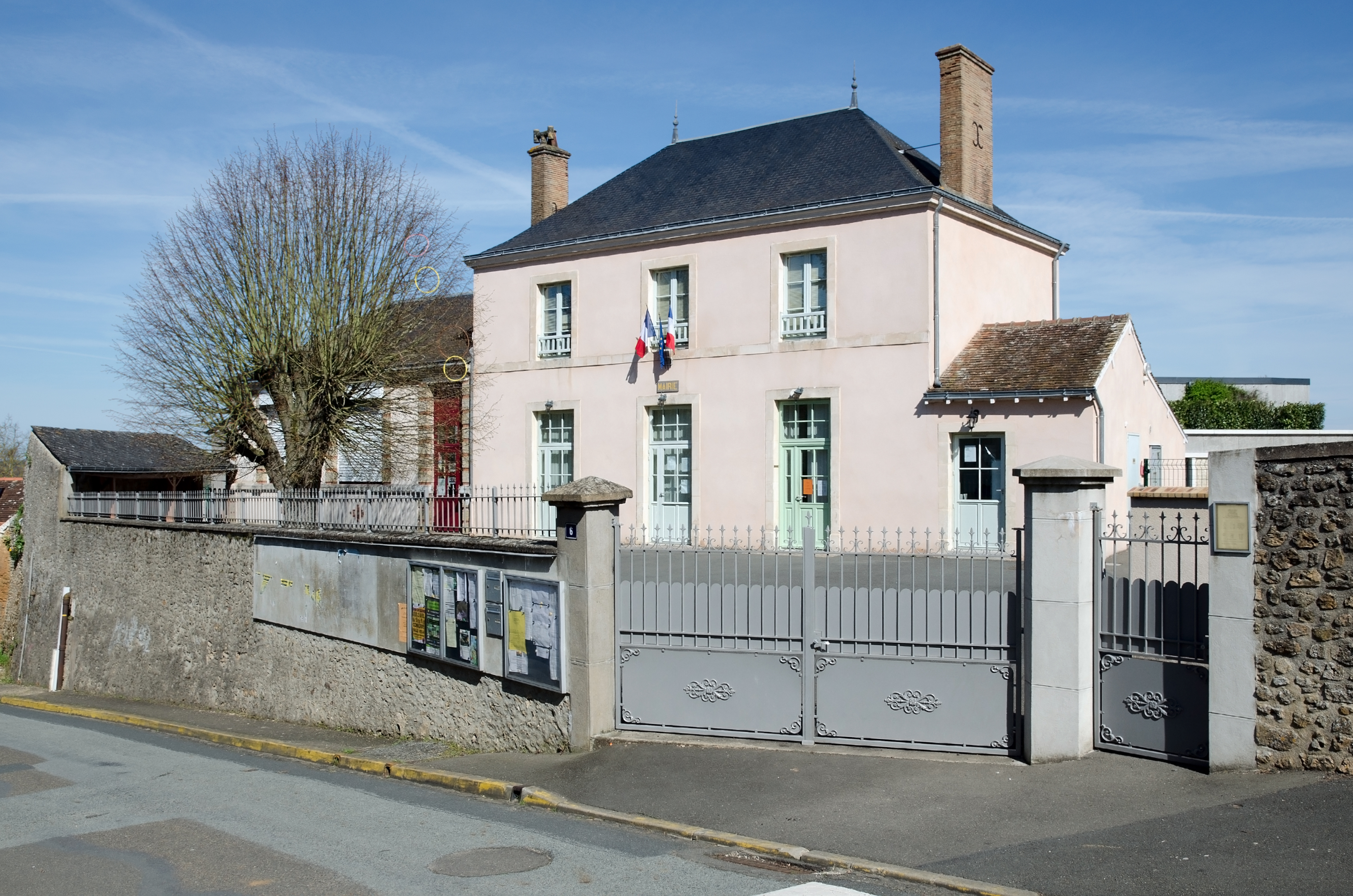
- Town hall
- Location of Duneau
- Location within France Location within Pays de la Loire
- Coordinates: 48°04′09″N 0°31′19″E
- Country: France
- Region: Pays de la Loire
- Department: Sarthe
- Arrondissement: Mamers
- Canton: La Ferté-Bernard
- Intercommunality: CC du Perche Emeraude

Government
  - Mayor (2020–2026): Joël Ciron
- Area^{1}: 12.82 km^{2} (4.95 sq mi)
- Highest elevation: 133 m (436 ft)
- Lowest elevation: 62 m (203 ft)
- Population (2023): 1,078
  - Density: 84.09/km^{2} (217.8/sq mi)
- Demonym(s): Dunois, Dunoise
- Time zone: UTC+01:00 (CET)
  - Summer (DST): UTC+02:00 (CEST)
- INSEE/Postal code: 72122 /72160
- ^{1} French Land Register data, which excludes lakes, ponds, glaciers > 1 km^{2} (0.386 sq mi or 247 acres) and river estuaries.

Duneau (French pronunciation: [dyno]) is a commune in the Sarthe department in the Pays de la Loire region in north-western France.

== See also ==
- Communes of the Sarthe department
