= Planète Sciences =

French voluntary association

Planète Sciences is a French voluntary association founded in 1962 dedicated to the sciences.

The organization organizes the Coupe de France de robotique and Eurobot, an international amateur robotics contest
