= La Bosse, Sarthe =

La Bosse
- Commune
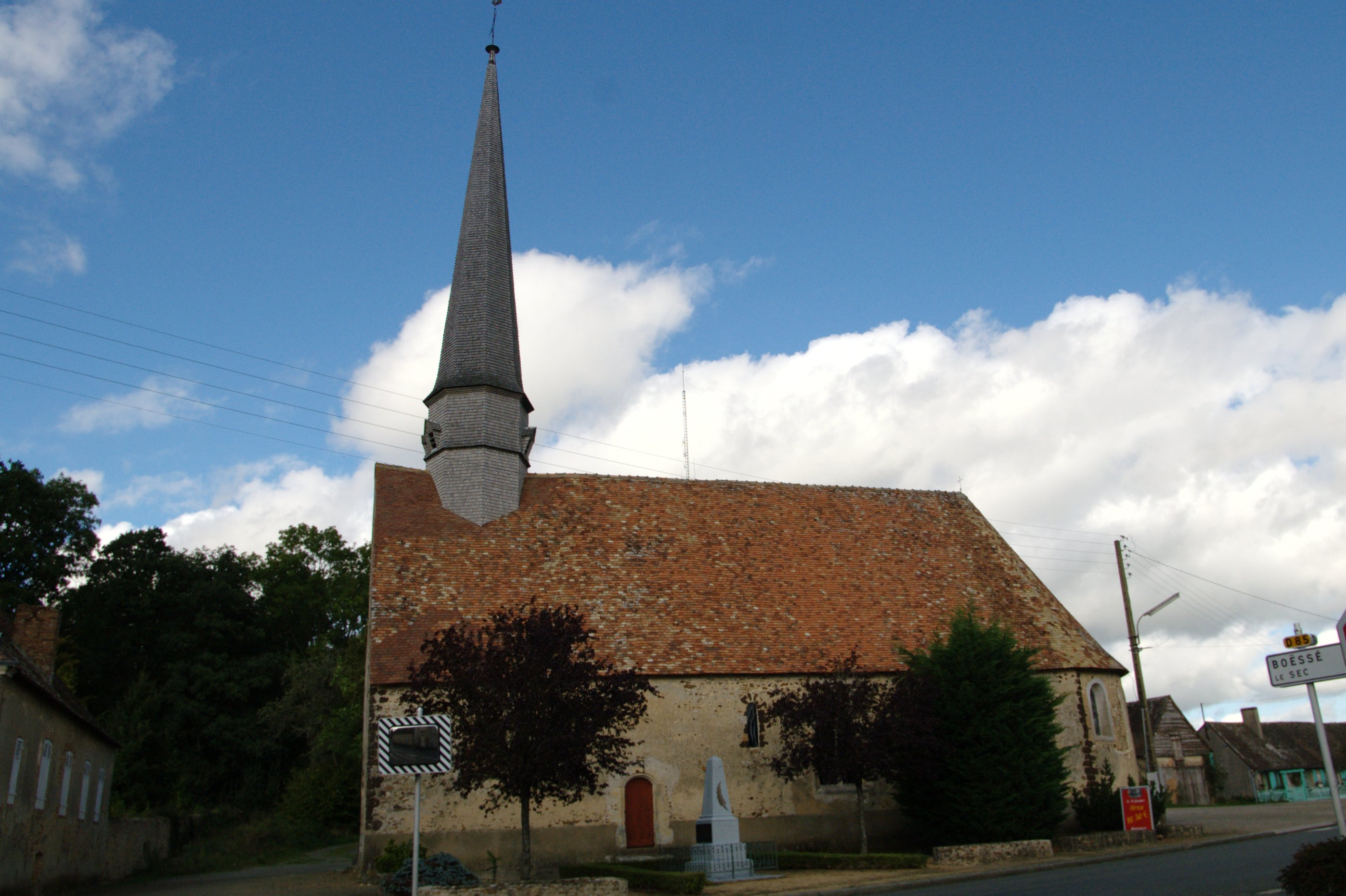
- Saint James church

- Coat of arms
- Location of La Bosse
- Location within France Location within Pays de la Loire
- Coordinates: 48°10′12″N 0°31′34″E
- Country: France
- Region: Pays de la Loire
- Department: Sarthe
- Arrondissement: Mamers
- Canton: La Ferté-Bernard
- Intercommunality: CC du Perche Emeraude

Government
  - Mayor (2020–2026): Raymond Bellencontre
- Area^{1}: 10.85 km^{2} (4.19 sq mi)
- Population (2023): 155
  - Density: 14.3/km^{2} (37.0/sq mi)
- Time zone: UTC+01:00 (CET)
  - Summer (DST): UTC+02:00 (CEST)
- INSEE/Postal code: 72040 /72400
- ^{1} French Land Register data, which excludes lakes, ponds, glaciers > 1 km^{2} (0.386 sq mi or 247 acres) and river estuaries.

La Bosse (French pronunciation: [la bɔs]) is a commune in the Sarthe department in the region of Pays de la Loire in north-western France.

== Population ==
Historical population
Year	Pop.	±% p.a.
1968	215	—
1975	201	−0.96%
1982	163	−2.95%
1990	141	−1.80%
1999	111	−2.62%
2007	125	+1.50%
2012	115	−1.65%
2017	137	+3.56%
2023	155	+2.08%
Source: INSEE

== See also ==
- Communes of the Sarthe department
