= Dehault =

- Commune
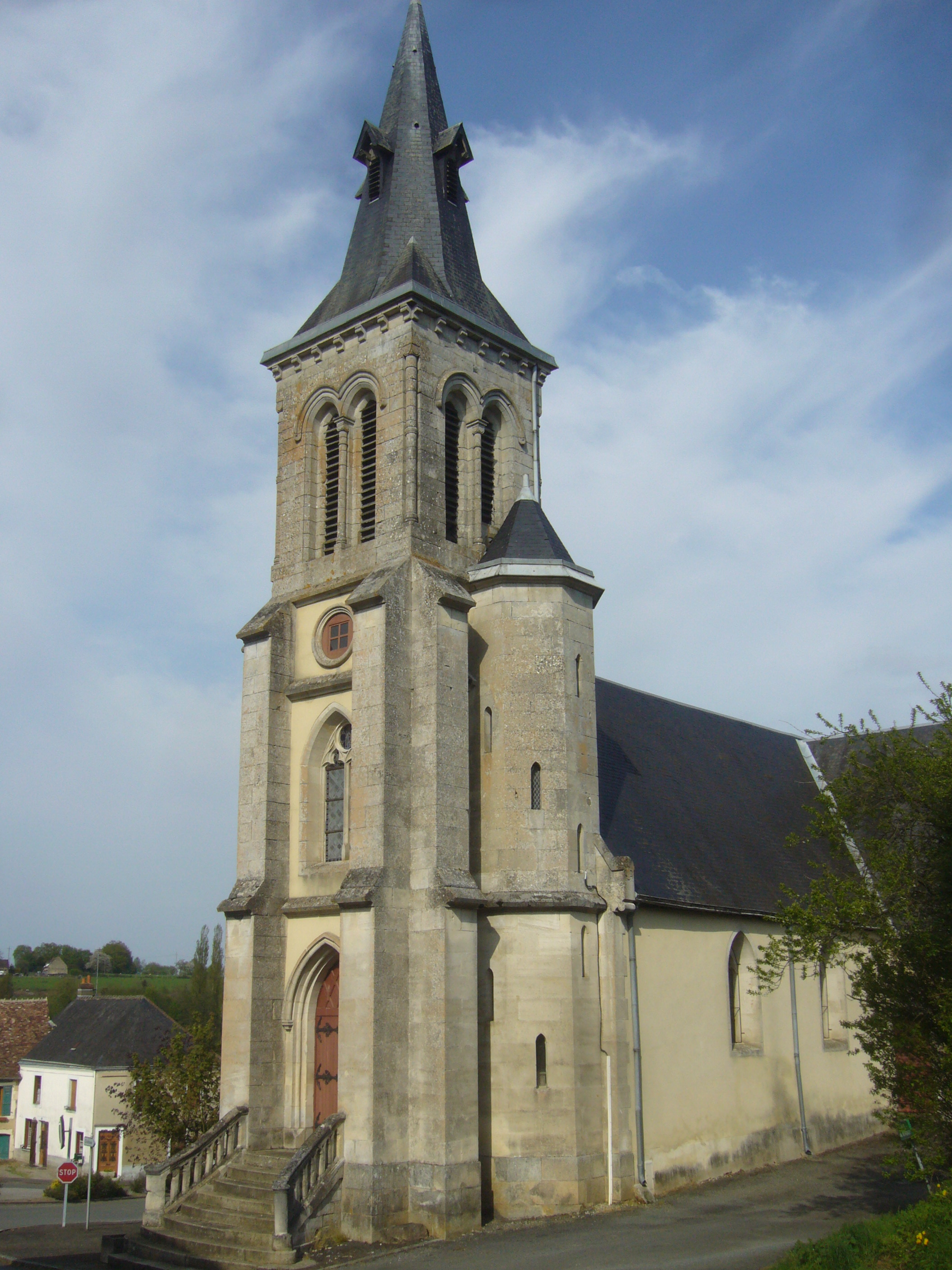
- The church of Saint Sulpice
- Location of Dehault
- Location within France Location within Pays de la Loire
- Coordinates: 48°12′39″N 0°34′21″E
- Country: France
- Region: Pays de la Loire
- Department: Sarthe
- Arrondissement: Mamers
- Canton: La Ferté-Bernard
- Intercommunality: CC du Perche Emeraude

Government
  - Mayor (2020–2026): Guy Chevaucher
- Area^{1}: 9 km^{2} (3.5 sq mi)
- Population (2023): 241
  - Density: 27/km^{2} (69/sq mi)
- Demonym(s): Dehaultais, Dehaultaise; Dehaultien, Dehaultienne
- Time zone: UTC+01:00 (CET)
  - Summer (DST): UTC+02:00 (CEST)
- INSEE/Postal code: 72114 /72400
- ^{1} French Land Register data, which excludes lakes, ponds, glaciers > 1 km^{2} (0.386 sq mi or 247 acres) and river estuaries.

Dehault (French pronunciation: [də.o]) is a commune in the Sarthe department in the Pays de la Loire region in north-western France.

== See also ==
- Communes of the Sarthe department
