= Le Luart =

- Commune
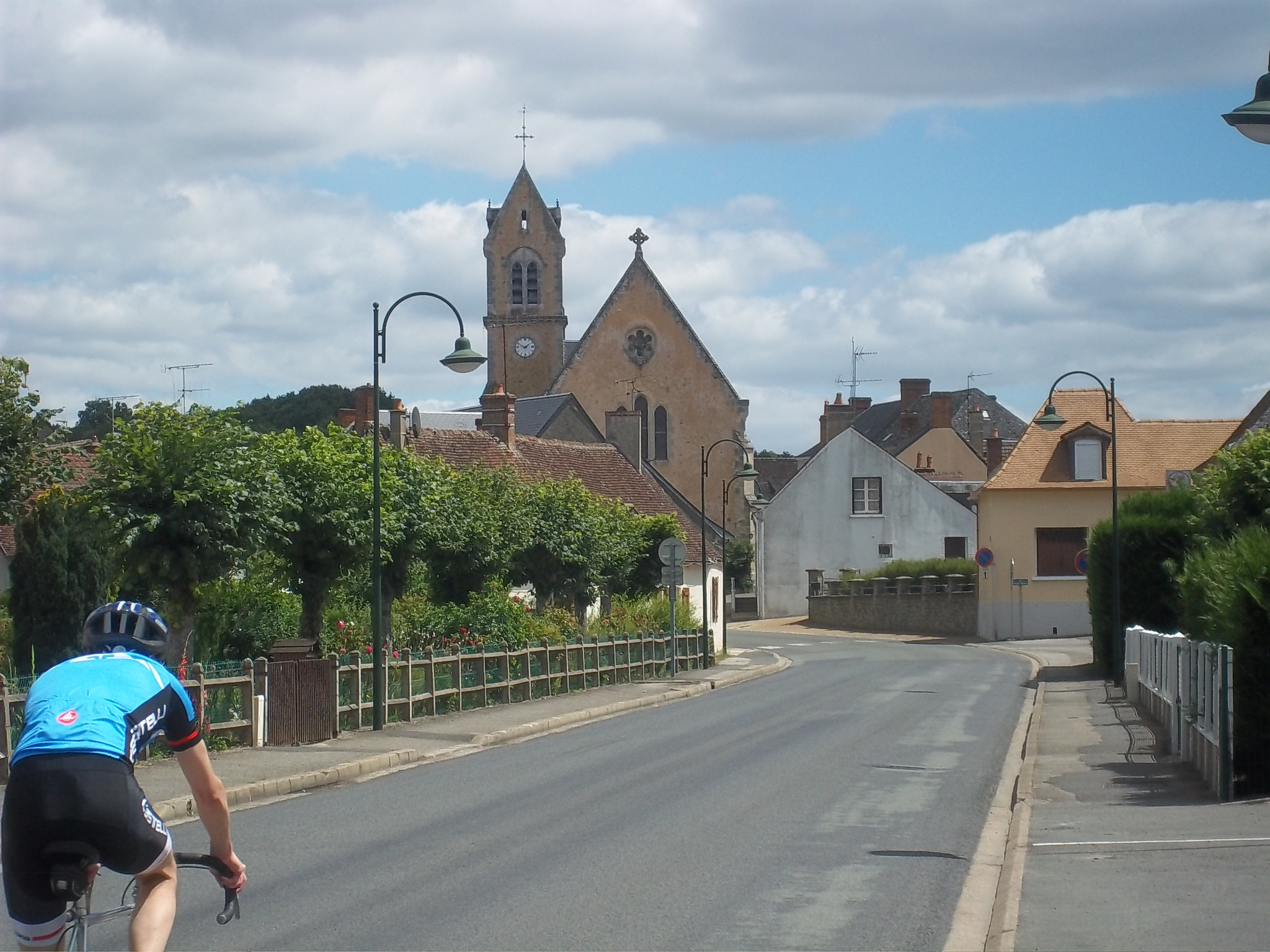
- A general view of Le Luart

- Coat of arms
- Location of Le Luart
- Location within France Location within Pays de la Loire
- Coordinates: 48°04′10″N 0°35′10″E
- Country: France
- Region: Pays de la Loire
- Department: Sarthe
- Arrondissement: Mamers
- Canton: La Ferté-Bernard
- Intercommunality: CC du Perche Emeraude

Government
  - Mayor (2020–2026): Alain Cruchet
- Area^{1}: 12.4 km^{2} (4.8 sq mi)
- Population (2023): 1,460
  - Density: 118/km^{2} (305/sq mi)
- Demonym(s): Luartais, Luartaise
- Time zone: UTC+01:00 (CET)
  - Summer (DST): UTC+02:00 (CEST)
- INSEE/Postal code: 72172 /72390
- ^{1} French Land Register data, which excludes lakes, ponds, glaciers > 1 km^{2} (0.386 sq mi or 247 acres) and river estuaries.

Le Luart (French pronunciation: [lə lɥaʁ]) is a commune in the Sarthe department in the region of Pays de la Loire in north-western France.

== See also ==
- Communes of the Sarthe department
