= Sceaux-sur-Huisne =

- Commune
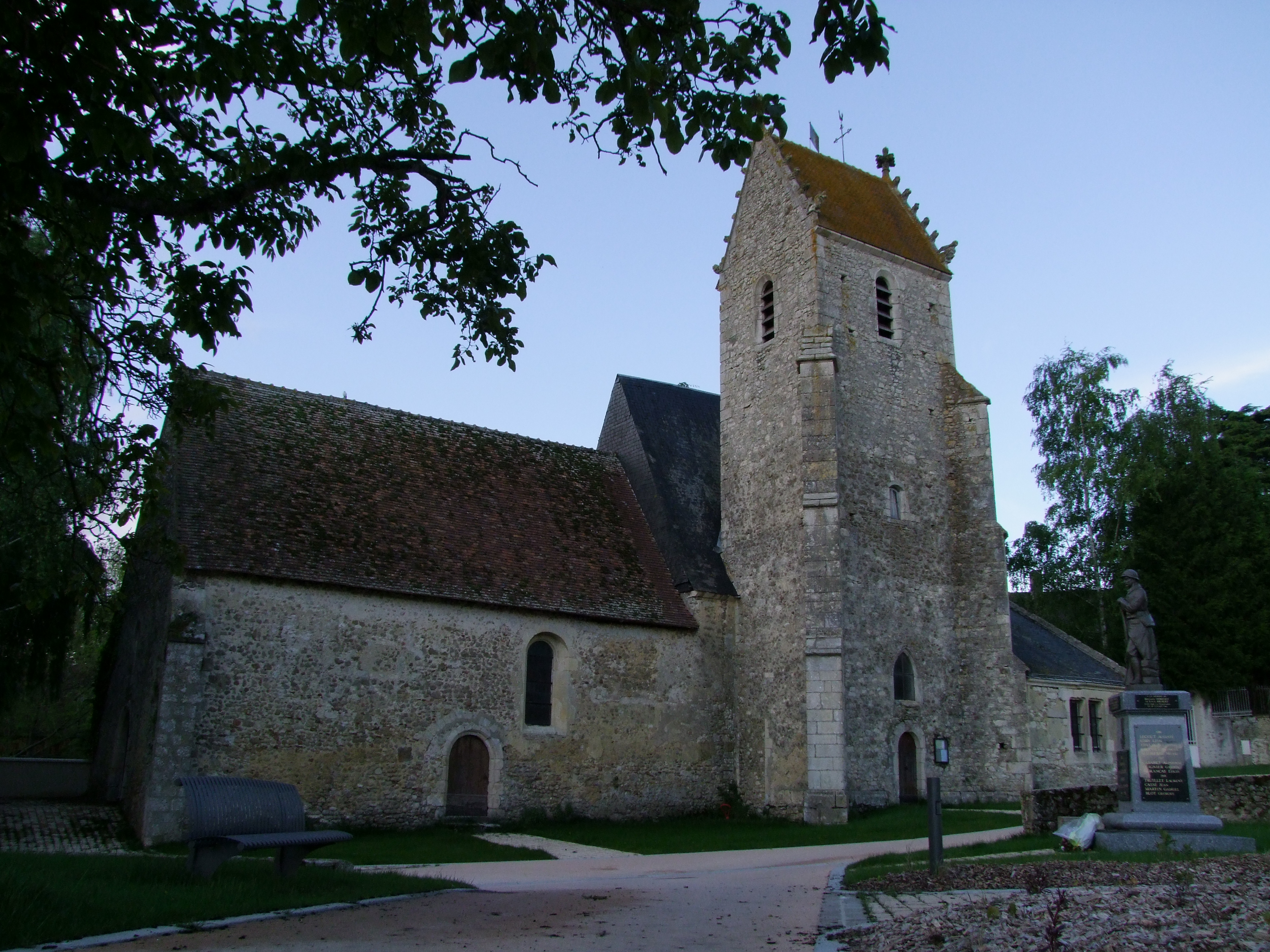
- The church of Saint-Germain-de-Paris, in Sceaux-sur-Huisne
- Location of Sceaux-sur-Huisne
- Location within France Location within Pays de la Loire
- Coordinates: 48°06′18″N 0°35′03″E
- Country: France
- Region: Pays de la Loire
- Department: Sarthe
- Arrondissement: Mamers
- Canton: La Ferté-Bernard
- Intercommunality: CC du Perche Emeraude

Government
  - Mayor (2020–2026): Éric Descombes
- Area^{1}: 11.7 km^{2} (4.5 sq mi)
- Population (2023): 587
  - Density: 50.2/km^{2} (130/sq mi)
- Demonym(s): Scelléen, Scelléenne
- Time zone: UTC+01:00 (CET)
  - Summer (DST): UTC+02:00 (CEST)
- INSEE/Postal code: 72331 /72160
- ^{1} French Land Register data, which excludes lakes, ponds, glaciers > 1 km^{2} (0.386 sq mi or 247 acres) and river estuaries.

Sceaux-sur-Huisne (French pronunciation: [so syʁ ɥin], literally Sceaux on Huisne) is a commune in the Sarthe department in the region of Pays de la Loire in north-western France.

== See also ==
- Communes of the Sarthe department
