= Boëssé-le-Sec =

- Commune
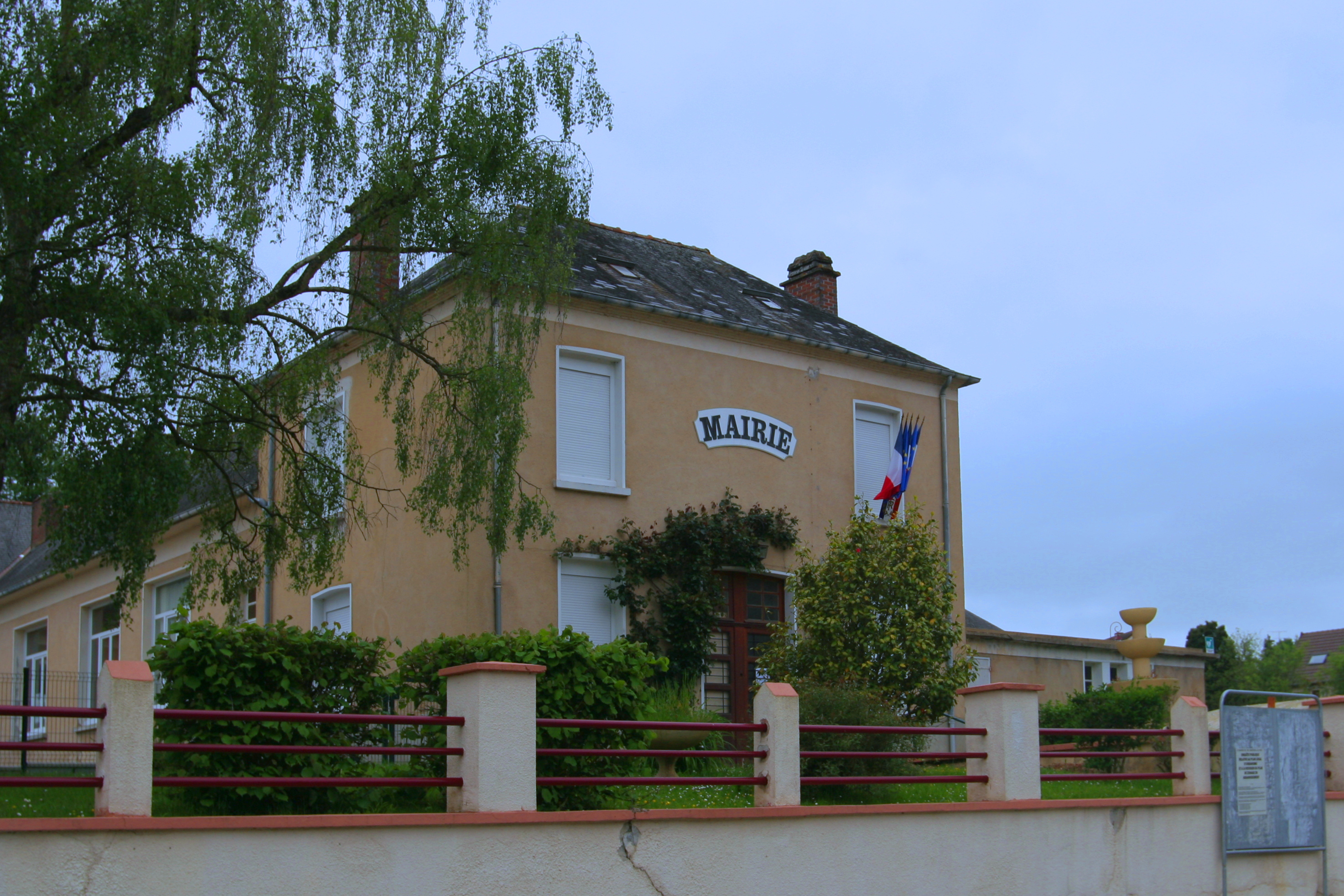
- Town hall
- Location of Boëssé-le-Sec
- Location within France Location within Pays de la Loire
- Coordinates: 48°08′05″N 0°33′58″E
- Country: France
- Region: Pays de la Loire
- Department: Sarthe
- Arrondissement: Mamers
- Canton: La Ferté-Bernard
- Intercommunality: CC du Perche Emeraude

Government
  - Mayor (2020–2026): Liliane Denis
- Area^{1}: 11.76 km^{2} (4.54 sq mi)
- Highest elevation: 163 m (535 ft)
- Lowest elevation: 72 m (236 ft)
- Population (2023): 515
  - Density: 43.8/km^{2} (113/sq mi)
- Demonym: Boësséen
- Time zone: UTC+01:00 (CET)
  - Summer (DST): UTC+02:00 (CEST)
- INSEE/Postal code: 72038 /72400
- ^{1} French Land Register data, which excludes lakes, ponds, glaciers > 1 km^{2} (0.386 sq mi or 247 acres) and river estuaries.

Boëssé-le-Sec is a commune in the Sarthe department in the region of Pays de la Loire in north-western France.

== See also ==
- Communes of the Sarthe department
