= Tuffé-Val-de-la-Chéronne =

- Commune
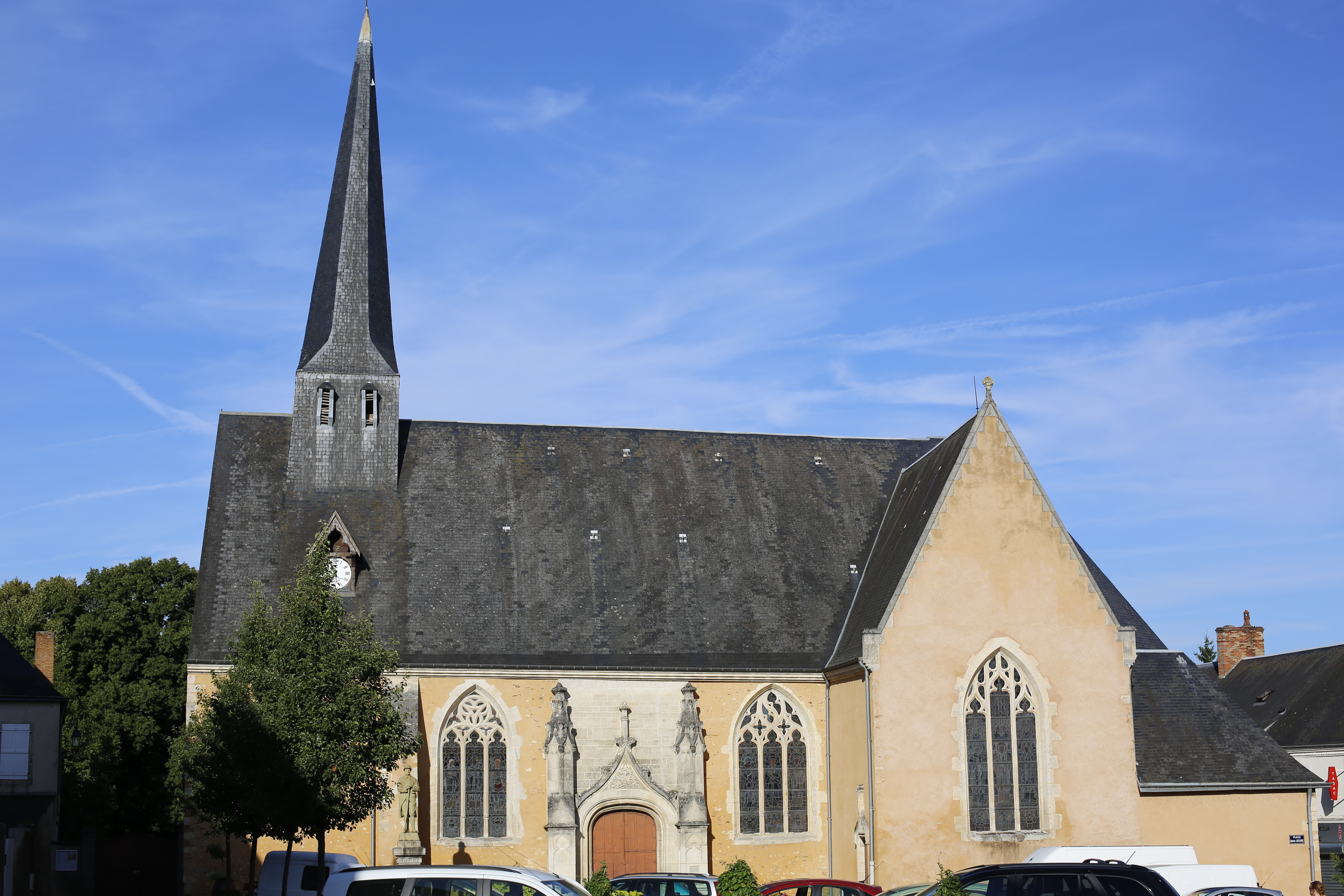
- The church of Saint-Pierre and Saint-Paul, in Tuffé
- Location of Tuffé-Val-de-la-Chéronne
- Location within France Location within Pays de la Loire
- Coordinates: 48°06′50″N 0°31′01″E
- Country: France
- Region: Pays de la Loire
- Department: Sarthe
- Arrondissement: Mamers
- Canton: La Ferté-Bernard
- Intercommunality: CC du Perche Emeraude
- Area^{1}: 29.16 km^{2} (11.26 sq mi)
- Population (2023): 1,680
  - Density: 57.6/km^{2} (149/sq mi)
- Time zone: UTC+01:00 (CET)
  - Summer (DST): UTC+02:00 (CEST)
- INSEE/Postal code: 72363 /72160
- ^{1} French Land Register data, which excludes lakes, ponds, glaciers > 1 km^{2} (0.386 sq mi or 247 acres) and river estuaries.

Tuffé-Val-de-la-Chéronne is a commune in the department of Sarthe, western France. The municipality was established on 1 January 2016 by merger of the former communes of Tuffé and Saint-Hilaire-le-Lierru.

== See also ==
- Communes of the Sarthe department
