= Tuffé =

Commune in Sarthe, France

- Part of Tuffé-Val-de-la-Chéronne
- Coat of arms
- Location of Tuffé
- Location within France Location within Pays de la Loire
- Coordinates: 48°06′51″N 0°30′55″E
- Country: France
- Region: Pays de la Loire
- Department: Sarthe
- Arrondissement: Mamers
- Canton: La Ferté-Bernard
- Commune: Tuffé-Val-de-la-Chéronne
- Area^{1}: 24.66 km^{2} (9.52 sq mi)
- Highest elevation: 150 m (490 ft)
- Lowest elevation: 68 m (223 ft)
- Population (2019): 1,531
  - Density: 62.08/km^{2} (160.8/sq mi)
- Demonym(s): Tufféen, Tufféenne
- Time zone: UTC+01:00 (CET)
  - Summer (DST): UTC+02:00 (CEST)
- Postal code: 72160
- ^{1} French Land Register data, which excludes lakes, ponds, glaciers > 1 km^{2} (0.386 sq mi or 247 acres) and river estuaries.

Tuffé is a former commune in the Sarthe department in the region of Pays de la Loire in north-western France. On 1 January 2016, it was merged into the new commune of Tuffé-Val-de-la-Chéronne.

The grammarian and lexicographer Pierre-Roland-François Butet (1769–1825) was born in Tuffé.

== See also ==
- Communes of the Sarthe department
