= Vouvray-sur-Huisne =

- Commune
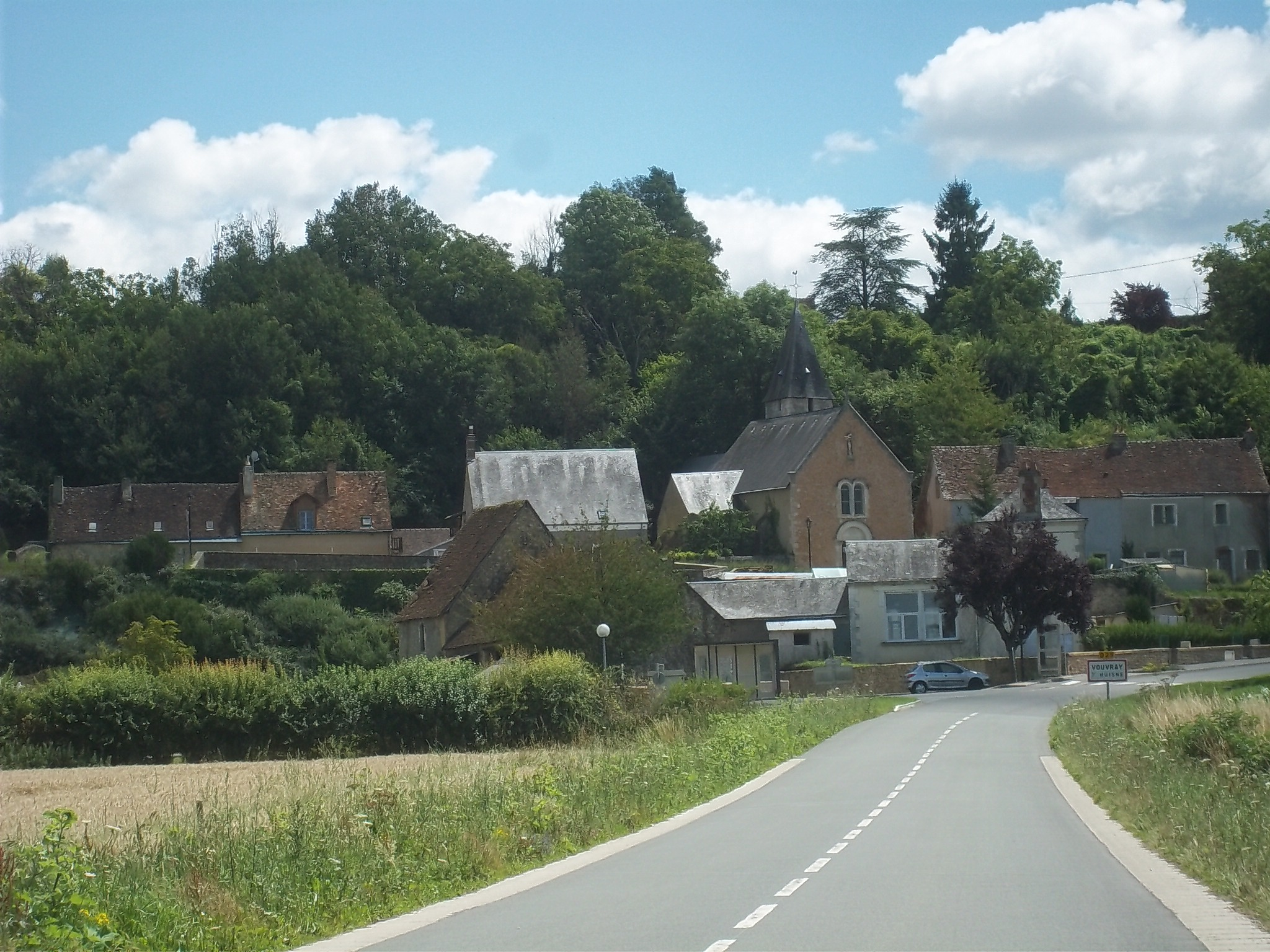
- A general view of Vouvray-sur-Huisne
- Location of Vouvray-sur-Huisne
- Location within France Location within Pays de la Loire
- Coordinates: 48°05′14″N 0°33′02″E
- Country: France
- Region: Pays de la Loire
- Department: Sarthe
- Arrondissement: Mamers
- Canton: La Ferté-Bernard
- Intercommunality: CC du Perche Emeraude

Government
  - Mayor (2020–2026): Jean-Pierre Ciron
- Area^{1}: 3.4 km^{2} (1.3 sq mi)
- Population (2023): 131
  - Density: 39/km^{2} (100/sq mi)
- Demonym(s): Vouvraysien, Vouvraysienne
- Time zone: UTC+01:00 (CET)
  - Summer (DST): UTC+02:00 (CEST)
- INSEE/Postal code: 72383 /72160
- ^{1} French Land Register data, which excludes lakes, ponds, glaciers > 1 km^{2} (0.386 sq mi or 247 acres) and river estuaries.

Vouvray-sur-Huisne is a commune in the Sarthe department in the region of Pays de la Loire in north-western France.

== See also ==
- Communes of the Sarthe department
