= Cormes =

- Commune
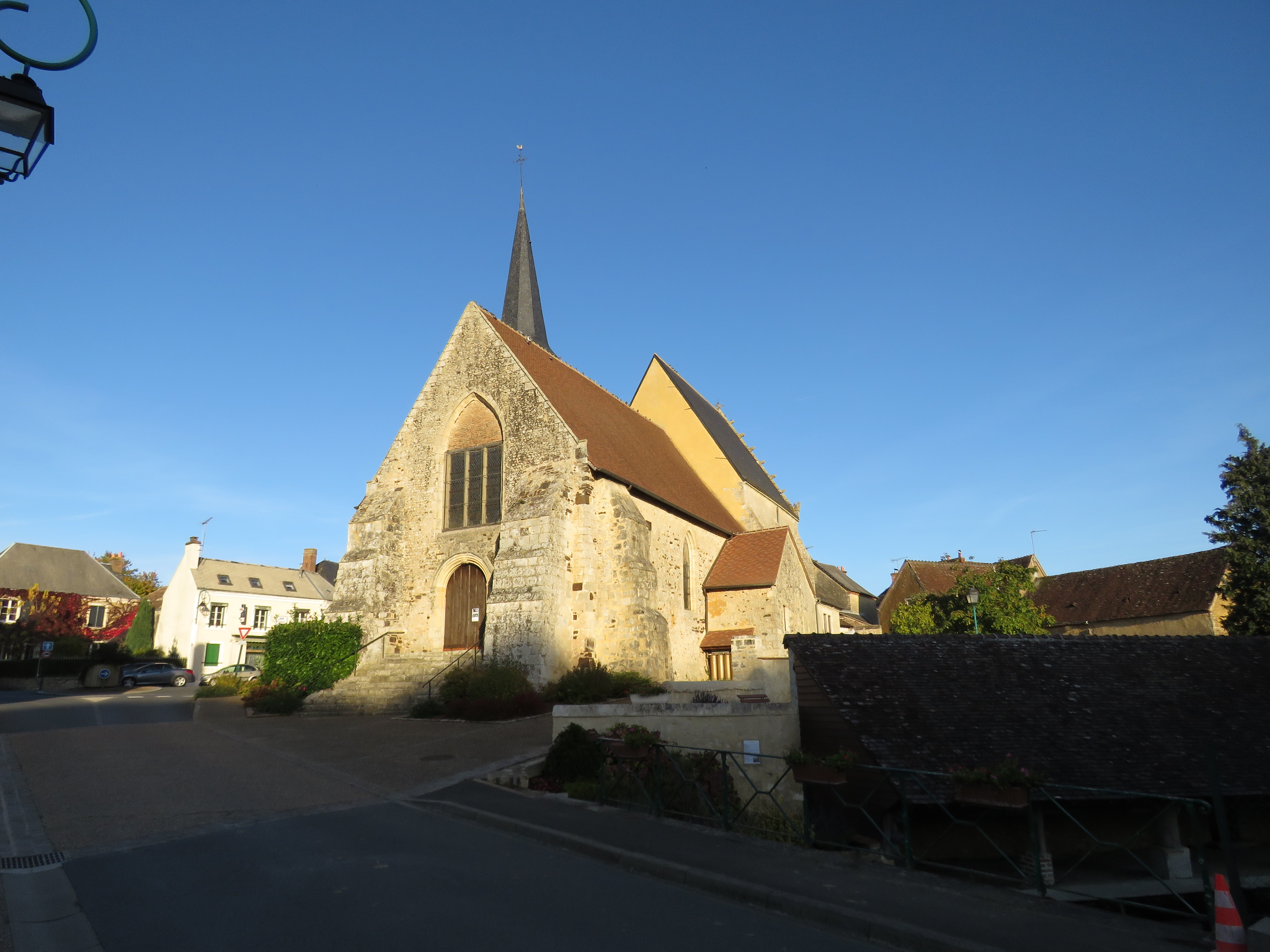
- The church of Saint-Denis, in Cormes
- Location of Cormes
- Location within France Location within Pays de la Loire
- Coordinates: 48°10′09″N 0°42′18″E
- Country: France
- Region: Pays de la Loire
- Department: Sarthe
- Arrondissement: Mamers
- Canton: La Ferté-Bernard
- Intercommunality: CC du Perche Emeraude

Government
  - Mayor (2020–2026): Didier Torche
- Area^{1}: 18.9 km^{2} (7.3 sq mi)
- Highest elevation: 113 m (371 ft)
- Lowest elevation: 113 m (371 ft)
- Population (2023): 893
  - Density: 47.2/km^{2} (122/sq mi)
- Demonym(s): Corméen, Corméenne
- Time zone: UTC+01:00 (CET)
  - Summer (DST): UTC+02:00 (CEST)
- INSEE/Postal code: 72093 /72400
- Website: cormes.fr
- ^{1} French Land Register data, which excludes lakes, ponds, glaciers > 1 km^{2} (0.386 sq mi or 247 acres) and river estuaries.

Cormes (French pronunciation: [kɔʁm]) is a commune in the Sarthe department in the Pays de la Loire region in Northwestern France. As of 2023, the population of the commune was 893.

== See also ==
- Communes of the Sarthe department
