= Coupe de France de robotique =

French robotics competition

Coupe de France de robotique is a robotics competition held in La Roche-sur-Yon, France, organized by Planète Sciences.

== History ==
The Coupe de France de robotique (former "E = M6 Cup of robotics", from the Science TV show) is a competition co-organized since 2016 by the association Planète Sciences and the mixed economy company Oryon.

The French Robotics Cup was created in 1994, originally, in partnership with the company VM Productions, (producer until 2005 of the show E = M6), and the association Planète Sciences. The idea comes from Nicolas Goldzahl (then president of VM Productions) who was inspired by a creative class of Professor Woodie Flowers of the Massachusetts Institute of Technology (MIT). This course - called the "2.007" - was given to about 50 students and consisted of participating in a competition in which remote-controlled robots had to be built, two by two, with a different rule each year. The goal is to develop students creativity. Nicolas Goldzahl, decided to adapt this idea in France, in two distinct categories: one with remote-controlled robots for college and high school students (Robotics Trophies), the other with autonomous robots for universities and engineering schools ( Robotics cup). To move from the idea to the realization, it was his meeting with the association Planet Science that was decisive. Planet Science wanted at that time to develop its robotics activity, Nicolas Goldzahl proposed to broadcast the event in the show E = M6 he was co-producing with Mac Lesggy. The first year, there were only fifteen participating teams (first location of the competition: Ecole Centrale Paris, now Central Supélec) but the media and the network of Planet Sciences contributed to its rapid development and very quickly this number exceeded the hundred teams from all over France.

The French Robotics Cup takes place every year and, until 2014, was part of the ARTEC festival in La Ferté-Bernard. In 2015, following the suspension of the organization of the ARTEC festival by the town of La Ferté-Bernard, the French Robotics Cup was looking for a new funding. In 2016 the competition found a new home in Vendée: La Roche-sur-Yon.
