= Saint-Martin-des-Monts =

- Commune
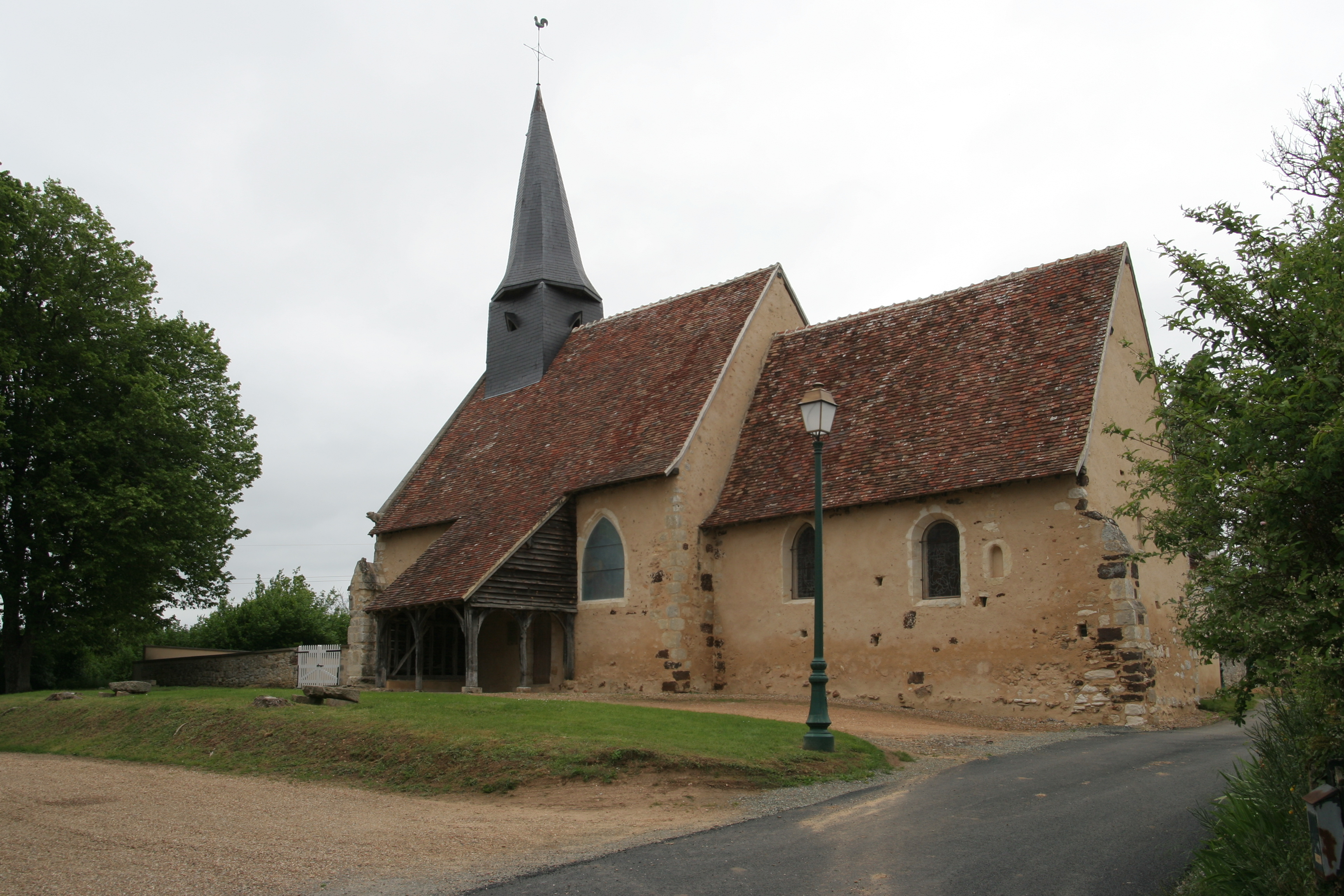
- The church of Saint-Martin, in Saint-Martin-des-Monts
- Location of Saint-Martin-des-Monts
- Location within France Location within Pays de la Loire
- Coordinates: 48°08′57″N 0°35′46″E
- Country: France
- Region: Pays de la Loire
- Department: Sarthe
- Arrondissement: Mamers
- Canton: La Ferté-Bernard
- Intercommunality: CC du Perche Emeraude

Government
  - Mayor (2020–2026): Patricia Edet
- Area^{1}: 5.72 km^{2} (2.21 sq mi)
- Highest elevation: 139 m (456 ft)
- Lowest elevation: 75 m (246 ft)
- Population (2023): 178
  - Density: 31.1/km^{2} (80.6/sq mi)
- Time zone: UTC+01:00 (CET)
  - Summer (DST): UTC+02:00 (CEST)
- INSEE/Postal code: 72302 /72400
- ^{1} French Land Register data, which excludes lakes, ponds, glaciers > 1 km^{2} (0.386 sq mi or 247 acres) and river estuaries.

Saint-Martin-des-Monts (French pronunciation: [sɛ̃ maʁtɛ̃ de mɔ̃]) is a commune in the Sarthe department in the region of Pays de la Loire in north-western France.

== See also ==
- Communes of the Sarthe department
