= La Ferté-Bernard =

- Commune
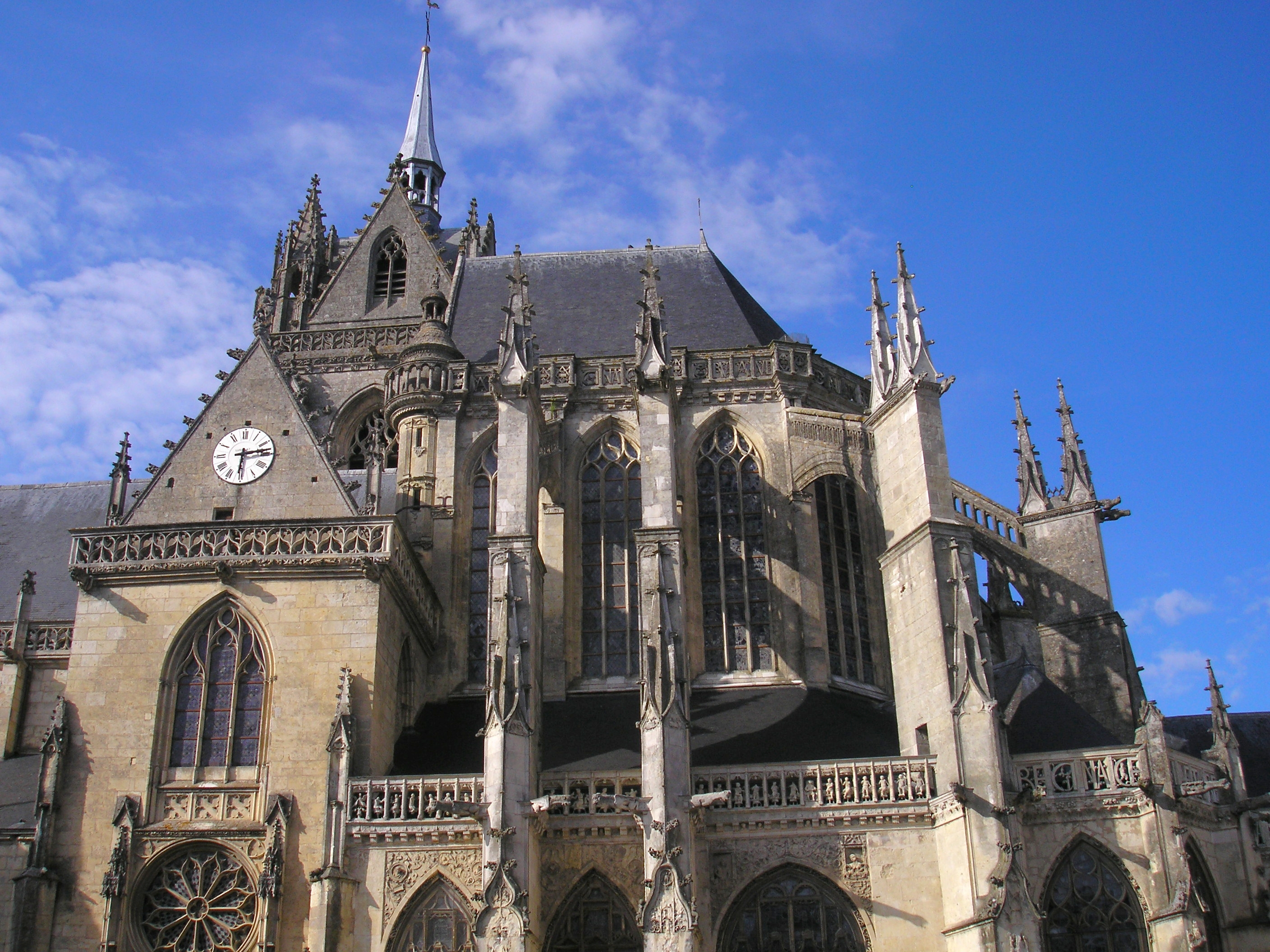
- The church of Notre-Dame des Marais

- Coat of arms
- Location of La Ferté-Bernard
- Location within France Location within Pays de la Loire
- Coordinates: 48°11′15″N 0°39′19″E
- Country: France
- Region: Pays de la Loire
- Department: Sarthe
- Arrondissement: Mamers
- Canton: La Ferté-Bernard
- Intercommunality: CC du Perche Emeraude

Government
  - Mayor (2020–2026): Didier Reveau
- Area^{1}: 14.96 km^{2} (5.78 sq mi)
- Highest elevation: 146 m (479 ft)
- Lowest elevation: 79 m (259 ft)
- Population (2023): 8,740
  - Density: 584/km^{2} (1,510/sq mi)
- Demonym(s): Fertois, Fertoise
- Time zone: UTC+01:00 (CET)
  - Summer (DST): UTC+02:00 (CEST)
- INSEE/Postal code: 72132 /72400
- ^{1} French Land Register data, which excludes lakes, ponds, glaciers > 1 km^{2} (0.386 sq mi or 247 acres) and river estuaries.

La Ferté-Bernard (French pronunciation: [la fɛʁte bɛʁnaʁ]) is a commune in the Sarthe department in the Pays de la Loire region in north-western France.

== History ==
La Ferté-Bernard owes its origin and name to a stronghold (fermeté) built about the 11th century and afterwards held by the family of Bernard. In 1424 it did not succumb to the English troops until after a four months' siege. It belonged in the 16th century to the family of Guise and supported the League, but was captured by the royal forces in 1590.

La Ferté-Bernard was involved in the 1906 Grand Prix de l'Automobile Club de France, the world's first motoring Grand Prix. The D97 towards Le Mans and the D1 towards Vibraye and Saint-Calais formed two sides of the triangular course.

== Population ==
Historical population
Year	Pop.	±% p.a.
1968	7,444	—
1975	9,137	+2.97%
1982	9,614	+0.73%
1990	9,355	−0.34%
1999	9,239	−0.14%
2007	9,251	+0.02%
2012	9,074	−0.39%
2017	8,820	−0.57%
2023	8,740	−0.15%
Source: INSEE

== Notable people ==
Louise du Pierry, astronomer, was born here on 7/30/1746 or 8/1/1746 as Elisabeth Louise Felicite Pourra de la Madeleine.

== Local folklore ==
La Ferte-Bernard is connected with a mythical dragon called the Peluda, which is said to have terrorized the town in medieval times.

== Twin towns ==
It is twinned with Louth in Lincolnshire.

== Climate ==
Climate data for La Ferté-Bernard (Cormes) (1991–2020 normals, extremes 1985–present)
Month	Jan	Feb	Mar	Apr	May	Jun	Jul	Aug	Sep	Oct	Nov	Dec	Year
Record high °C (°F)	16.5 (61.7)	22.5 (72.5)	25.0 (77.0)	30.0 (86.0)	33.0 (91.4)	38.3 (100.9)	42.8 (109.0)	42.0 (107.6)	35.5 (95.9)	29.8 (85.6)	21.8 (71.2)	16.5 (61.7)	42.8 (109.0)
Mean daily maximum °C (°F)	7.3 (45.1)	9.0 (48.2)	12.8 (55.0)	16.3 (61.3)	19.8 (67.6)	23.3 (73.9)	25.8 (78.4)	25.7 (78.3)	21.9 (71.4)	16.5 (61.7)	11.0 (51.8)	7.7 (45.9)	16.4 (61.5)
Daily mean °C (°F)	4.5 (40.1)	5.0 (41.0)	7.8 (46.0)	10.3 (50.5)	13.8 (56.8)	17.2 (63.0)	19.2 (66.6)	19.1 (66.4)	15.8 (60.4)	12.1 (53.8)	7.6 (45.7)	4.9 (40.8)	11.4 (52.5)
Mean daily minimum °C (°F)	1.7 (35.1)	1.1 (34.0)	2.7 (36.9)	4.2 (39.6)	7.9 (46.2)	11.0 (51.8)	12.6 (54.7)	12.6 (54.7)	9.8 (49.6)	7.7 (45.9)	4.3 (39.7)	2.1 (35.8)	6.5 (43.7)
Record low °C (°F)	−20.0 (−4.0)	−15.2 (4.6)	−12.0 (10.4)	−6.5 (20.3)	−2.0 (28.4)	−0.5 (31.1)	3.0 (37.4)	1.5 (34.7)	−0.5 (31.1)	−6.5 (20.3)	−10.5 (13.1)	−12.0 (10.4)	−20.0 (−4.0)
Average precipitation mm (inches)	72.0 (2.83)	58.0 (2.28)	58.7 (2.31)	51.6 (2.03)	66.1 (2.60)	59.9 (2.36)	55.0 (2.17)	51.3 (2.02)	53.5 (2.11)	70.6 (2.78)	74.4 (2.93)	88.5 (3.48)	759.0 (29.88)
Average precipitation days (≥ 1.0 mm)	13.8	11.3	10.7	10.4	9.8	8.5	7.9	7.6	8.5	12.2	13.5	14.3	128.6
Source: Meteociel

== See also ==
- Communes of the Sarthe department
