= La Chapelle-Saint-Rémy =

- Commune
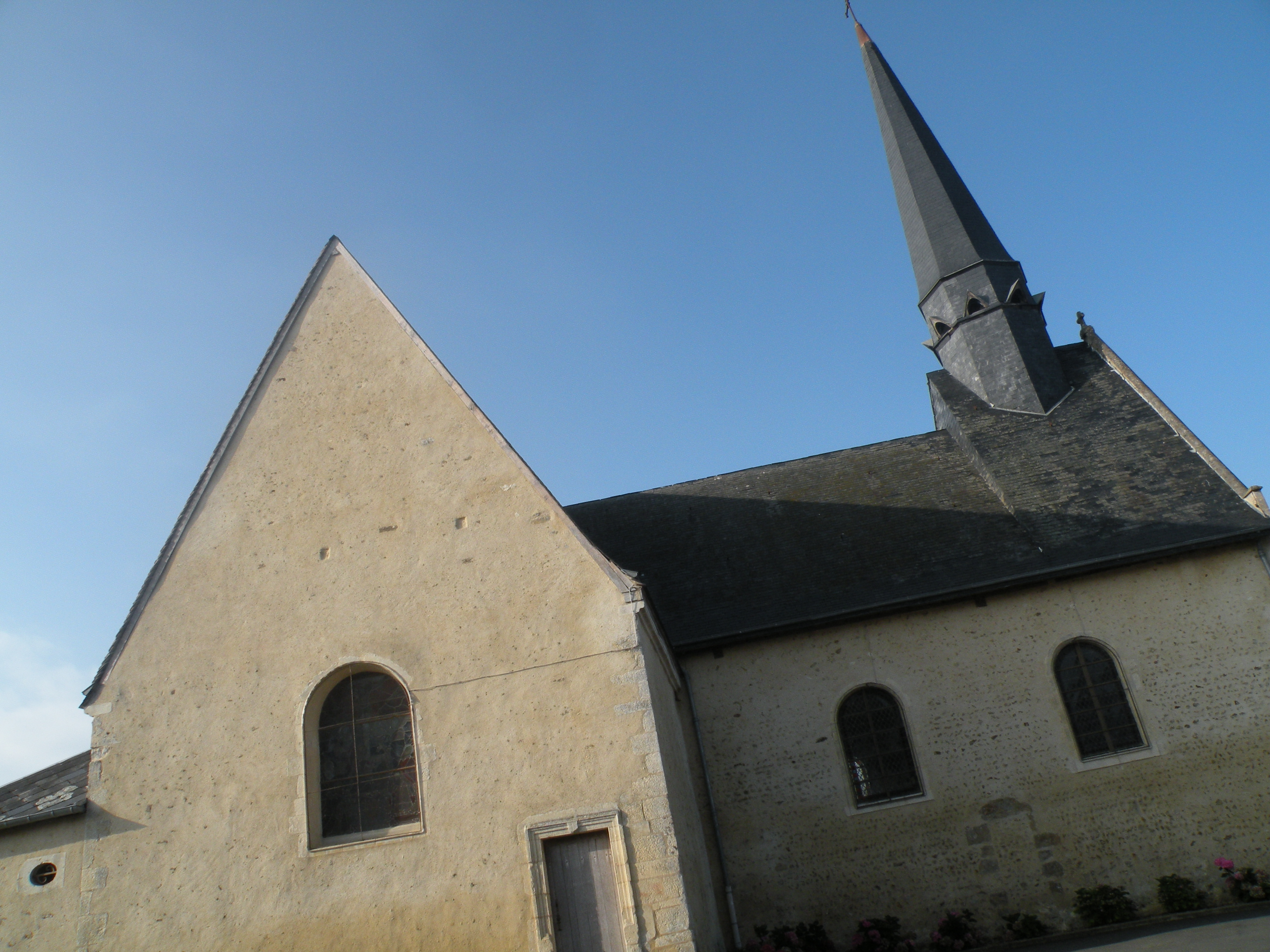
- The church
- Location of La Chapelle-Saint-Rémy
- Location within France Location within Pays de la Loire
- Coordinates: 48°06′27″N 0°27′33″E
- Country: France
- Region: Pays de la Loire
- Department: Sarthe
- Arrondissement: Mamers
- Canton: La Ferté-Bernard
- Intercommunality: CC du Perche Emeraude

Government
  - Mayor (2020–2026): Dominique Edon
- Area^{1}: 19.4 km^{2} (7.5 sq mi)
- Population (2023): 995
  - Density: 51.3/km^{2} (133/sq mi)
- Demonym(s): Capelloremyen, Capelloremyenne
- Time zone: UTC+01:00 (CET)
  - Summer (DST): UTC+02:00 (CEST)
- INSEE/Postal code: 72067 /72160
- ^{1} French Land Register data, which excludes lakes, ponds, glaciers > 1 km^{2} (0.386 sq mi or 247 acres) and river estuaries.

La Chapelle-Saint-Rémy (French pronunciation: [la ʃapɛl sɛ̃ ʁemi]) is a commune in the Sarthe department in the Pays de la Loire region in north-western France.

== See also ==
- Communes of the Sarthe department
