= Canton of La Ferté-Bernard =

Coordinates: 48.19°N 0.65°E

The canton of La Ferté-Bernard is an administrative division of the Sarthe department, northwestern France. Its borders were modified at the French canton reorganisation which came into effect in March 2015. Its seat is in La Ferté-Bernard.

It consists of the following communes:

1. Avezé
2. Beillé
3. Boëssé-le-Sec
4. La Bosse
5. Bouër
6. La Chapelle-du-Bois
7. La Chapelle-Saint-Rémy
8. Cherré-Au
9. Cormes
10. Dehault
11. Duneau
12. La Ferté-Bernard
13. Le Luart
14. Préval
15. Prévelles
16. Saint-Aubin-des-Coudrais
17. Saint-Denis-des-Coudrais
18. Saint-Martin-des-Monts
19. Sceaux-sur-Huisne
20. Souvigné-sur-Même
21. Théligny
22. Tuffé-Val-de-la-Chéronne
23. Villaines-la-Gonais
24. Vouvray-sur-Huisne
