= Alauni =

Gallic tribe

The Alauni (Gaulish: Alaunoi, earlier *Alamnoi, 'the nomads, wanderers') were a Gallic tribe dwelling around the lake Chiemsee (in present-day Germany) during the Roman period.

== Name ==
They are mentioned as Alaunoí (Ἀλαυνοί) by Ptolemy (2nd c. AD), and as Alaunorum in the Notitia Dignitatum (5th c. AD).

The ethnic name Alauni is a latinized form of the Gaulish Alaunoi, which can be translated as 'the errants, wanderers, or nomads', in contrast to the names of the Anauni ('the staying ones') and Genauni ('the natives'). It derives from an earlier *Alamnoi (sing. *Alamnos), which is close to the Proto-Celtic stem *alamo- ('herd'; cf. OIr. alam, Welsh alaf), built on a root *alǝ- ('to wander'). The name of the Gallic deity Alaunos is related.

According to scholar Lionel S. Joseph, the semantic opposition between the Alauni and Anauni recalls the later opposition between the wandering fían and the settled túath in early Ireland.

== Geography ==
The Alauni lived near Chiemsee, a lake in present-day Bavaria. The Barrington Atlas locates their territory east of the Cosuanetes, north of the Ambisontes, south of the Baiovarii.
