= Roman conquest =

Roman conquest may refer to one of the following:

- Roman conquest of Anglesey
- Roman conquest of Britain
- Roman conquest of Cyprus
- Roman conquest of Egypt
- Roman conquest of Gaul
- Roman conquest of Greece
- Roman conquest of the Iberian Peninsula
- Roman conquest of Illyria
- Roman conquest of Italy
- Roman conquest of Rhetia and the Alps

== See also ==
- List of Roman external wars and battles
- Roman–Persian wars
