= Alaunus =

Gaulish god

Alaunus or Alaunius (Gaulish: Alaunos) is an ancient Gaulish god. His name is known from inscriptions found in Lurs (southearn France) and in Mannheim (western Germany). The feminine form Alauna occurs on one inscription from Pantenburg and underlies the name of several rivers.

== Name ==
The Gaulish theonym Alaunos stems from a Proto-Celtic form reconstructed as *Alamnos, which is also attested in the plural form in the ethnonym Alauni (Αλαυνοί) from Noricum.

The etymology remains uncertain. It has been traditionally derived from the root *al- ('feed, raise, nurture'). On this basis, *Alamnos could be translated as 'the Nourishing One', and would be comparable to the Latin alumnus ('nursling') and, with a different suffix, to river names such as Almus (*Almos) in Moesia and Yealm (*Almā) in England. Alternatively, Xavier Delamarre has proposed deriving the name from the root alǝ- ('to wander'), which he argues would suit both river and ethnic names. In this view, *Alamnos may be compared with the Celtic stem *alamo- ('herd'), and the Alauni understood as the 'errants' or 'nomads', in contrast to the ethnonym Anauni ('the Staying Ones').

The name Alaunos is at the origin of many place-names and hydronyms across Europe, including Aln in Northumberland, Alun (*alounos) in Wales and Allamps in Meurthe. A feminine form Alauna (from an earlier *Alamnā) can also be found in Alleaume (Manche) and several Allonnes (Eure-et-Loir, Maine-et-Loire, Sarthe).

== Epigraphy ==
Alaunus is known from a small group of Latin dedications. The god Alaunius is named at Lurs in southern Gaul, and as Mercurius Alaunus at Mannheim in Germany. A feminine form, Alauna, occurs in two dedications from Pantenburg, alongside the goddess Boudina.

Near Lurs, a sanctuary of Alaunius is thought to have stood at the mansio of Alaunium, now the Chapel of Notre Dame des Anges, on the evidence of the reused inscription in its north wall. Guy Barruol and Pierre Martel suggested that the original cult site lay on the nearby height of the Pied d'Aulun, and was moved closer to the main road as that route grew in importance under Augustus. The dedication from Mannheim, which links Alaunus with Mercury, a god of roads, has been taken to support this reading.

The related goddesses Alounae are also attested near Salzburg.

Text	Find-spot	Divine name(s)	Translation	Reference	Comments
[...]us Tacitus [...] Alaunio [...] s(ua) p(ecunia) v(otum) s(olvit) l(ibens) m(erito)	Lurs	Alaunius	[...]us Tacitus, at his own expense, willingly and deservedly fulfilled his vow to Alaunius.	CIL XII, 1517	Reused in the north wall of the Chapel of Notre Dame des Anges, on the site of the mansio of Alaunium. Probably [Deo] Alaunio.
[Ge]nio Mercur(i) Alauni Iul(ius) Ac[co]nius Augustinus ex v(oto) s(olvit) l(ibens) l(aetus) m(erito)	Mannheim	Mercurius Alaunus	To the Genius of Mercurius Alaunus, Julius Acconius Augustinus fulfilled his vow willingly, gladly and deservedly.	CIL XIII, 6425	Alaunus is joined here to Mercury.
[Bo]udinae [e]t Alaunae C(aius) Sextilius Sollemnis	Pantenburg	Boudina, Alauna	To Boudina and Alauna, Gaius Sextilius Sollemnis (set this up).	Finke 82	The feminine form Alauna, with the goddess Boudina.
Deo Voroi(o) Boudinae et Alaunae C(aius) Sextilius Sollemnis	Pantenburg	Vorio, Boudina, Alauna	To the god Vorio, Boudina and Alauna, Gaius Sextilius Sollemnis (set this up).	Finke 83	By the same dedicant, with the god Vorio added.
