= Bavarians (disambiguation) =

Bavarians may refer to:

- Bavarians, the people of the federal state of Bavaria
- Bavarii, a 6th-century term for Bavarians
