= Licates =

Gallic tribe

The Licates (Gaulish: *Licatis 'those of the Licca' or 'those of the rock') were a Gallic tribe dwelling in the upper valley of the Lech river during the Iron Age and the Roman period.

== Name ==
They are mentioned as Likátioi (Λικάτιοι; var. -ττ-) by Strabo (early 1st c. AD), as Licates by Pliny (1st c. AD), and as Likátoi (Λικάτοι) by Ptolemy (2nd c. AD).

The ethnic name Licates has been traditionally compared to the river name Licca (modern Lech), and translated as 'those of the Licca'. According to Patrizia de Bernardo Stempel, however, "the word formations of the ethnonym and hydronym suggest that they originated independently of each other, even though they both contain the same Celtic lexeme lic(c)a ('rock'). One would therefore assume that Licates simply denoted the 'rock dwellers' and thus inevitably represented a relatively old ethnic designation."

== Geography ==
The Licates lived in the upper valley of the Lech river (Licca). The Barrington Atlas locates their territory east of the Estiones, north of the Genauni, west of the Cosuanetes. They were part of the Vindelici.

Their chief town, known as Damasia, has been identified with a fortified settlement in Auerberg, near modern Bernbeuren. Its name stems from a Gaulish word for 'cow' or 'stag', damos.

== History ==
They are mentioned by Pliny the Elder as one of the Alpine tribes conquered by Rome in 16–15 BC, and whose name was engraved on the Tropaeum Alpium.

Licates were still serving as auxiliary soldiers in the Roman army ca. 160 AD.
