= Rhaetian people =

Historic ethnic confederation of Alpine tribes

The Roman Empire in the time of Hadrian (ruled 117 – 138 AD), showing, on the upper Danube river, the imperial province of Raetia, encompassing territories of what are now Switzerland, Tyrol and Germany south of the Danube.

The Raeti (/ˈraɪtiː/ RY-tee; spelling variants: Rhaeti, Rheti or Rhaetii) were a confederation of Alpine tribes, whose language and culture appear to have been related to those of the Etruscans. Before the Roman conquest, they inhabited present-day Tyrol in Austria, eastern Switzerland and the Alpine regions of northeastern Italy. After the Roman conquest, the province of Raetia was formed.

The etymology of the name Raeti is uncertain. The Roman province of Raetia was named after these people.

Ancient sources characterise the Raeti as an Etruscan people who were displaced from the Po Valley by the Gauls and took refuge in the valleys of the Alps. But it is likely that they were predominantly indigenous Alpine people. Their language, the so-called Raetian language, was probably related to Etruscan, but may not have derived from it. At least some of the Raeti tribes (those in northeastern Italy) probably continued to speak the Raetian language as late as the 3rd century AD. Others (those in Switzerland) were probably Celtic-speaking by the era of the Roman emperor Augustus (ruled 30 BC – AD 14).

The Raeti were divided into numerous tribes, but only some of these are clearly identified in the ancient sources.

The Raeti tribes, together with those of their Celtic-speaking neighbours to the north, the Vindelici, were subjugated by the Imperial Roman army in 15 BC and their territories annexed to the Roman Empire. The Roman province of Raetia et Vindelicia was named after these two peoples. The Raeti tribes quickly became loyal subjects of the empire and contributed disproportionate numbers of recruits to the imperial Roman army's auxiliary corps.

== Name etymology ==
The origin of the name Raeti is uncertain. It has similarities to the endonym of the Etruscans: Rasenna, the root of which appears to be Etruscan rasna "the people". However, it is unclear whether the Rhaetians had a similar endonym or if Raeti is an exonym (a name used by outsiders to describe the Rhaetians).

The Roman geographer Pliny the Elder, writing in AD 70, suggests that the people were named after "Raetus", a leader at the time of their supposed "expulsion" from the Po Valley. However, eponymous founders were a common, demonstrably fabricated, origin story. (The most famous illustration of this theory is the legend that the City of Rome derives its name from Romulus, its supposed founder, while if Romulus ever existed at all (which most scholars doubt), then it would be far more likely that he derived his own name from an existing place name Roma, rather than vice versa.).

Virgil [70 BC-19 BC] in his Georgics II praises a person named 'Rhaetian' for the quality of wine grapes from the region. It is assumed from the context that he accounts it to a single person, and not the people in general. It would suggest that Virgil accounted Rhaetus to be the god-father of the Rhaetian people.

It has also been suggested that the name Raeti may be connected with Reitia, a major goddess who was revered in northeast Italy and is attested in a number of inscriptions on votive tablets of the Veneti people. One Raetic votive tablet, from the same region, contains the word reithus, which may refer to this deity.

== Origins ==
Peoples of northern Italy during the 4th to 3rd centuries BC (Celtic tribes are shown in blue).

The earliest mention of the Raeti in surviving ancient sources is in the Histories of Polybius, written before 146 BC. The Raeti, according to Pliny the Elder, were Etruscans driven into the Alps from the Po Valley by invading Gauls. This account of Raeti origins is supported by the Augustan-era Roman historian Livy. If this historiography is correct, then the displacement from the Po Valley would have taken place in the period 600–400 BC, when major migrations of Celtic tribes from Gaul resulted in the Celtisation of that entire region.

The traditional migration theory, advanced by classical authors and widely accepted by modern scholars until the 1960s, is no longer regarded as the only plausible explanation for sociolinguistic change. If the Raeti spoke a language closely related to Etruscan, they may have been indigenous Alpine populations whose linguistic traditions predated, or were at least as ancient as, those of the Etruscans in Etruria. This possibility is particularly relevant if, as many scholars have proposed, Etruscan represents a survival of a pre-Indo-European linguistic substratum in Italy and the Alps. Alternatively, if the Alpine populations originally spoke an unrelated language, they may have adopted Etruscan through processes other than large-scale migration, such as cultural contact with the Etruscans of the Po Valley or the establishment of an Etruscan ruling elite that gradually imposed its linguistic influence through political dominance over local communities.

Archaeological research on the Fritzens-Sanzeno culture and the Magrè group indicates that Celtic influence increased from around the 4th century BC, following the decline of Etruscan influence in the Po Valley. This influence affected aspects of material culture, while Celtic-speaking communities and individuals also interacted with the Raeti. However, the evidence suggests that permanent Celtic settlement in the central and eastern Alpine region was relatively limited, rather than involving wholesale replacement of the indigenous population.

== Ethno-linguistic affiliation ==
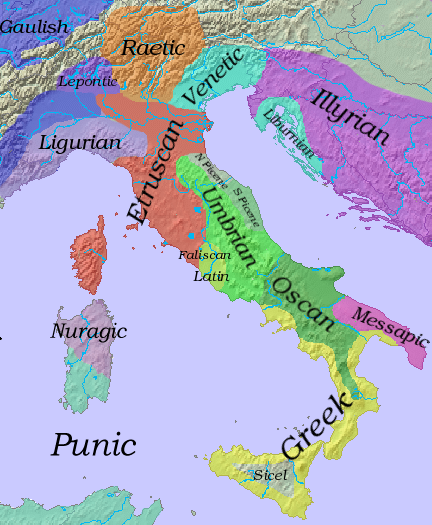
Linguistic map of Italy ca. 600 BC, showing the putative area where the Raetian language was spoken.

The Raeti are believed by many scholars to have spoken, originally at least, the Raetian language, an extinct tongue known only from a series of inscriptions, written in a variant of the Etruscan alphabet. This tongue is commonly regarded by most philologists to be related to Etruscan, a non-Indo-European language which is best documented in the central Italian regions of Tuscany, northern Latium and western Umbria, and also in other Italian regions of Emilia-Romagna, Campania and Lombardy. The language has been called "Raetian" by linguists because it is deduced to have been spoken by the Raeti based on various sources of evidence.

Even if Raetian was the ancestral language of the Raeti, there is considerable uncertainty as to how widely Raetian was spoken among the tribes by the time of Augustus (ruled 30 BC - AD 14). In the Alpine region as a whole, there is evidence that the non-Celtic elements had, by the time of Augustus, been assimilated significantly by the influx of Celtic tribes and had adopted Celtic speech. According to Livy, the "sound" of the Raeti's original Etruscan tongue (sonum linguae) had become corrupted as a result of inhabiting the Alps. This may indicate that at least some of the tribes lost their ancestral Raetic tongue to Celtic. Celticisation also finds support in the Roman practice of twinning the Raeti with their neighbours to the North, the Vindelici, who are regarded by most historians to have been Celtic speakers. The territories of the two peoples were combined for administrative purposes from an early stage and eventually, under the emperor Claudius (ruled 41–54), as the province of Raetia et Vindelicia. In addition, a pair of joint Raetorum et Vindelicorum auxiliary cohorts were established under Augustus.

Further support for the hypothesis that the northern Raeti tribes converted to Celtic speech before the Roman imperial era is provided by the distribution of Raetian inscriptions. These have been found mostly in northeastern Italy: South Tyrol, Trentino, and the Veneto region. The Raetic inscriptions indicate that Raetian survived as late as the 3rd century AD, suggesting the existence at that time of Raeti tribes, at least in northeast Italy, which had not converted to Celtic speech. In addition, the abundance of Celtic toponyms in the Rhaetian territory leads to the conclusion that, by the time of the Roman conquest, many of the Rhaetians were heavily Celticized.

During the centuries of Roman rule, the Raeti became predominantly Latin-speakers. It has been suggested that a surviving relic of the Raeti's Latin speech is the Rhaeto-Romance languages, which includes the Ladin, Friulian and Romansh languages. Romansch survives today in a few valleys of the Swiss canton Grisons (most of which is today German-speaking). However, a Raetian origin for Romansch is uncertain, as Rhaeto-Romance languages appear most closely related to the Gallo-Romance group, strengthening the argument that at least some of the Raeti had adopted Celtic speech before Latinisation.

== Territory ==
Middle Iron Age groups and cultures in North Central Italy.

The evidence suggests that the original Roman district of Raetia et Vindelicia, as established under Augustus, had as its eastern border (with the province of Noricum) the river Aenus (Inn) from its confluence with the Danube as far South as, and then by the river Isarcus (Eisack). Its northern border with the "free" German tribes was defined by the course of the upper Danube. On the West, Raetia et Vindelicia included the whole of Lake Constance and the upper Rhine Valley and then a long tract westwards along the upper Rhone Valley as far as Lake Leman. To the South, its border with the Italian regiones (administrative districts) of Gallia Transpadana and Venetia et Histria was roughly similar to the northern border of present-day Italy.

The Vindelici were, according to Ptolemy, confined to the East of the river Licca (Lech), while West of that river, upper Bavaria was inhabited by Raeti. A contrary view is that the whole region between the Danube and the Alps was occupied by Vindelici, with the Raeti confined to the Alps themselves.

The latter view accords with Strabo, who records that the territory occupied by the Raeti tribes stretched from the upper reaches of the river Rhine in northern Switzerland to as far south as the cities of Como and Verona in northern Italy. The Raeti were bounded in the East by the Celtic Taurisci of Noricum and in the West by the Helvetii.

== Tribes ==
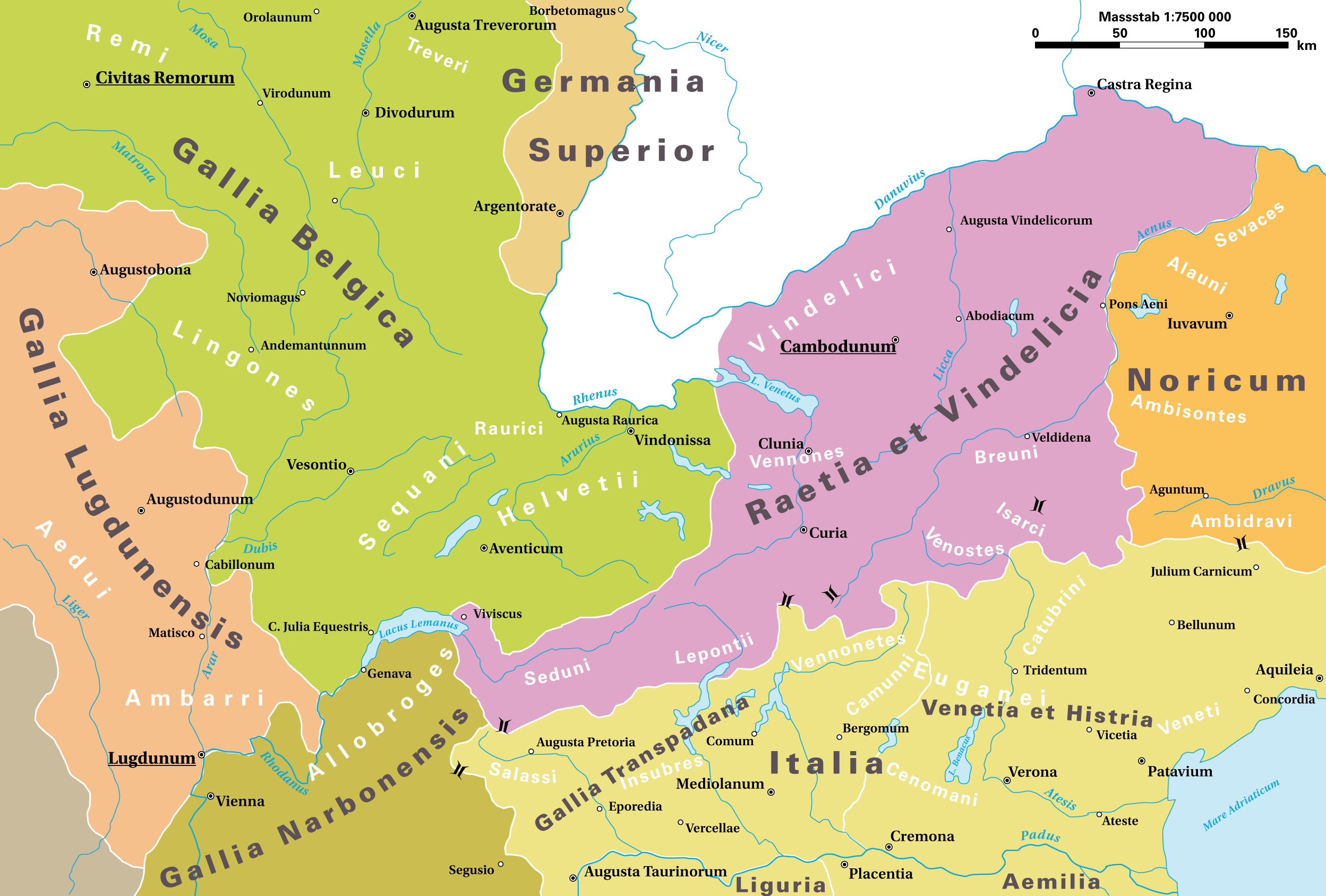
Map showing the Roman district (probably not yet a full province by then) of Raetia et Vindelicia, as it stood in AD 14, with some Raeti tribal names

Although the ancient sources concur in ascribing an Etruscan origin to the Raeti, they are less clear as to precisely which tribes attested in the region known as Raetia could be classified as Raeti (and whether such a classification was based on geographical location or language or cultural factors). In addition, there are considerable discrepancies in the names of tribes given by the sources. Some locations of the tribes recorded are uncertain, although most have been established securely by placename and personal-name evidence.

Strabo names the Lepontii, Camunni (who gave their name to the Val Camonica, Lombardy, Italy), Cotuantii and Rucantii as Raeti tribes. Of these, the first two are listed with the same spelling in Augustus' inscription while the latter two are probably the Cosuanetes and the Rucinates respectively in Augustus. However, the inscription text appears to identify the Rucinates as one of the 4 tribes of the Vindelici recorded as conquered. (But it is possible that the Strabo's Rucantii were actually another tribe, the Rugusci, in Augustus).

Against Strabo, Pliny considers the Lepontii as a Celtic tribe akin to the Taurisci and classifies the Camunni as a tribe of the Euganei people of northeast Italy, together with the Trumplini of the neighbouring valley, Val Trompia. However, neither of Pliny's comments is fatal to the identification of the Lepontii and Camunni as Raeti. The Lepontic language has been definitively classified as a distinct Continental Celtic language (e.g. Lejeune 1971, Koch 2008). As for the Euganei, their linguistic classification is uncertain due to scanty evidence. It is possible that their speech was also related to Etruscan, possibly a sub-group of Tyrsenian languages. Alternatively their language may have been Indo-European, akin to that of their close neighbours, the Celts or the Veneti (whose language shares several similarities with Latin and the other Italic languages, but also has some affinities with other Indo-European languages, especially Germanic and Celtic).

In addition, it appears that "Raetia et Vindelicia" was also inhabited by a number of non-Raetic tribes. The Breuni and Genauni are classified as Illyrian by Strabo, while a number of tribes in the region have plausible Celtic etymologies: e.g. Caturiges from catu- ("fight" or "warriors") and Nantuates from nantu- ("valley") respectively.

The Tropaeum Alpium inscription contains the names of 45 Alpine tribes. The Raetic tribes south of Meran were peacefully integrated into the Roman Empire, and therefore do not feature on the Tropaeum Alpium. The Tabula clesiana for instance mentions the Anauni, Sinduni and Tulliasses. Taking those that did get named that inhabited the territories of Raetia et Vindelicia province and Venetia et Histria regio of N. Italy, and eliminating those tribes considered probably Celtic by scholars (Medulli, Ucenni, Caturiges, Brigiani, Sogionti, Ceutrones, Uberi, Nantuates, Sedunes, Veragri), the following list of possible Raeti tribes results:

LIST OF POSSIBLE RAETI TRIBES
Tribal name (as on Tropaeum Alpium)	Name variants	Territory (main valley/river)	Main town (Roman era)	Modern district	Notes
BREUNI		upper valley of fl. Aenus (r. Inn)		Tirol (Austria)	Identified as Illyrian tribe by Strabo
BRIXENETES		valley of fl. Atesis (r. Adige)	Brixina (Brixen)	South Tyrol (Italy)	
CALUCONES		Calanda (upper valley of fl. Rhenus - r. Rhine)	Curia (Chur)	Canton Grisons (Switzerland)	
CAMUNNI	Camuni	Val Camonica (river Oglio)	Civitas Camunnorum (Cividate Camuno)	Brescia Province (Lombardia, It.)	A tribe of the Euganei, acc. to Pliny
COSUANETES	Cotuantii?	upper valley of fl. Isaras (r. Isar) (Bavarian Alps)	Turum (Dorfen)	Oberbayern (Ger.)	Tribe of the Vindelici, acc. to possible interpretation of tropaeum Alpium inscription. Raeti, acc. to Strabo, if his Cotuantii are the same
FOCUNATES		Upper valley of fl. Aenus (r. Inn)		Tirol (Austr.)	Neighbours to Genaunes and Breuni
GENAUNES	Genauni	upper valley of fl. Aenus (r. Inn)		Tirol	Identified as Illyrian tribe by Strabo
ISARCI		valley of fl. Isarcus (r. Isarco)		South Tyrol	
LEPONTI	Lepontii, Lepontes	Val d'Ossola		Province of Verbano-Cusio-Ossola (Piemonte, It.)	Named as Raeti by Strabo. Celtic, according to Pliny
RUCINATES	Runicates, Rucantii?	? between rivers Isaras (Isar) and Danuvius (Danube)	Sorviodurum (Straubing)	Niederbayern	Tribe of the Vindelici, acc. to possible interpretation of Tropaeum Alpium inscription. Named as Raeti by Strabo, if they are same as Rucantii)
RUGUSCI	Ruigusci, Rucantii?	Alta Engadina (fl. Aenus - r. Inn)		Canton Grisons	May be Rucantii in Strabo
SUANETES	Sarunetes	valley of r. Albula	Lapidaria (Zillis)	Canton Grisons	Identified as Raeti by Pliny
TRUMPILINI	Trumplini	Val Trompia		Brescia province	A tribe of the Euganei, acc. to Pliny
VENNONETES	Vennones, Vennonienses	upper valley of fl. Rhenus (r. Rhine)		Canton Saint Gallen	Identified as Raeti by Pliny
VENOSTES		Vinschgau (It. Val Venosta) (fl. Atesis - r. Adige)		South Tyrol	

== Roman conquest ==
The Raeti, together with their probably Celtic neighbours to the North, the Vindelici, were subdued by the Roman emperor Augustus' stepsons and senior military commanders Tiberius and Drusus in a two-pronged campaign in 15 BC.

Until ca. AD 100, the region was garrisoned, on its western edge (at Vindonissa from ca. AD 15), by at least one Roman legion (probably legio XIX until AD 9, when it was destroyed in the Battle of the Teutoburg Forest). In addition, Roman auxiliary forces and leves armaturae ("light troops", probably a local militia) were stationed there. But these forces were mainly for security against external threats, not internal unrest. Strabo wrote that the Alpine tribes as a whole adapted easily to Roman rule and had not rebelled in the 33 years that had elapsed since the initial conquest.

The Raeti (and the Vindelici) were obliged to pay taxes to Rome. However, their combined territory was initially organised not as a full Roman province but a military district under a Roman equestrian officer, attested as "praefectus of the Raeti, Vindelici and the Poenine Valley". It was apparently not before emperor Claudius (ruled 41–54), that the district became a full province with the official name of Raetia et Vindelicia (abbreviated to simply Raetia in the later 1st century), while the Poenine Valley (Canton Valais, Switz.) was separated to join the province of Alpes Graiae. Raetia was governed by an equestrian procurator.

According to the epigraphic record, the early Julio-Claudian period of the Roman Empire (30 BC - AD 37) saw the formation of at least 10 auxiliary infantry regiments from the Raeti tribes (the cohortes Raetorum). This represents some 5,000 recruits, an enormous levy from sparsely populated Alpine valleys. It suggests that the Raeti were strongly attracted to a career in the Roman military. (See Alpine regiments of the Roman army).

== See also ==
- Alpine regiments of the Roman army
- Raetia
- Raetic language
- Rhaeto-Romance languages
- Fritzens-Sanzeno culture
