= Brixentes =

Gallic tribe

The Brixentes or Brixenetes were a Celtic or Rhaetian tribe living in the Alps during the Iron Age and the Roman era.

== Name ==
They are mentioned as Brixentes (var. -xenetis, -xenetes) by Pliny (1st c. AD), and as Brixántai (Βριξάνται) by Ptolemy (2nd c. AD). An identification with Strabo's Brigántioi (Βριγάντιοι) has been proposed by Ernst Meyer.

The Celtic ethnic name Brixentes might derive from an earlier form *brig-s-ant-, built on the root brig- ('hill, hillfort'). It has been translated as 'those living on hills/hillforts', or as 'those living in the area of *Brigsa'.

== Geography ==
There is no scholarly consensus where in the Alps the Brixentes actually lived.

Some scholars have pointed out that they are listed on the Tropaeum Alpium between the Calucones and the Lepontii, which would make modern-day eastern Switzerland or western Austria (in particular the area around Bregenz) a possible location. According to Meyer, this would further corroborate the corresponding information by Ptolemy about the Brixántai and, if the two groups are identified, Strabo's evidence for the Brigántioi as well.

Drawing on the similarity of the place name, other scholars have located the Brixentes at the confluence of the Eisack and Rienz rivers in modern-day South Tyrol, near the modern city of Brixen, which, according to this theory, could be reconstructed as *Brigsa, or *Brigsina. The Barrington Atlas locates their territory south of the Isarci, west of the Saevates, east of the Venostes.

== History ==
They are mentioned by Pliny the Elder as one of the Alpine tribes conquered by Rome in 16–15 BC, and whose name was engraved on the Tropaeum Alpium.

According to the ancient geographer Ptolemy, the Brixentes were a Rhaetian tribe.
