= Tabula clesiana =

Bronze plate that contains the edict of the Caesar Claudius

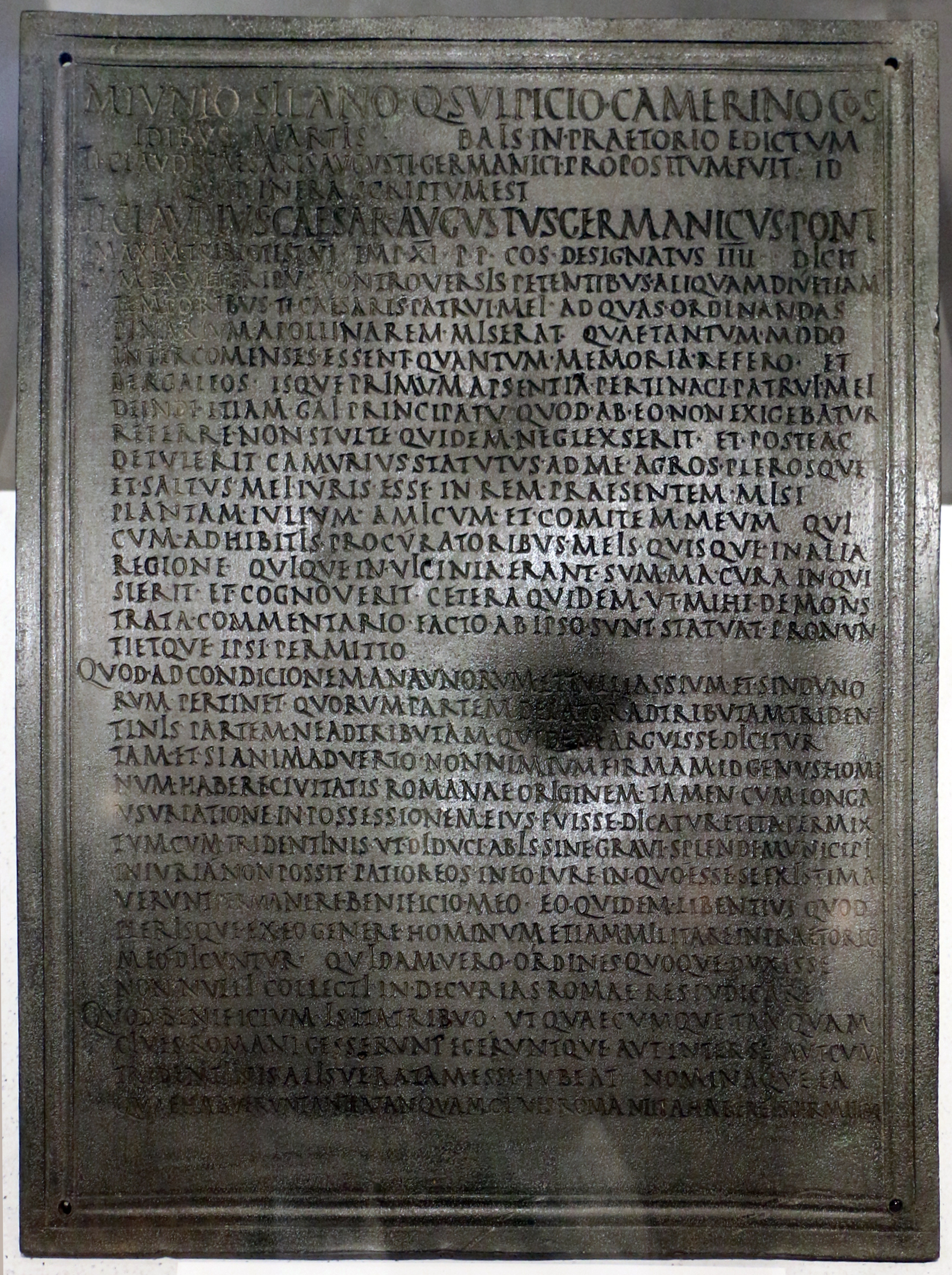
Tabula clesiana

The Tabula clesiana (CIL V 5050—ILS 206) is a bronze plate size cm. 49.9 x 37.8 x 0.61, discovered in 1869 at Campi Neri near Cles in Trentino, northern Italy. It contains the edict de Anaunorum civitate of Emperor Claudius of 46 AD, which granted the Roman citizenship to the Alpine peoples of the Anauni, Sinduni and Tulliasses. These three tribes are believed to have settled in the relative vicinity of Trento as associates of the Tridentini. Gleirscher places the Anauni in the Val di Non with Anaunium, today's Nanno, as their center.

The Tabula is conserved at the Castello del Buonconsiglio Museum in Trento.

== Significance ==
The Tabula is an important evidence of the rapid assimilation of the populations of ancient Raetia into the Roman world but also from the point of view of the Roman law the first evidence of the introduction of delatores in the fiscal controversy.

The name of the Bergaleos has been connected with the name of Val Bregaglia.

== Translation ==
"During the consulship of Marcus Junius Silanus and Quintus Sulpicius Camerinus, on the Ides of March, in Baia, in the judgment hall, it was affixed the edict of Tiberius Claudius Caesar Augustus Germanicus which is transcribed below. Tiberius Claudius Caesar Augustus Germanicus, Pontifex Maximus, during his sixth tribunate, after his eleventh acclamation as Emperor, father of the country, appointed consul for the fourth time, says: Because, among the oldest disputes in progress since the time of my uncle Tiberius Caesar, for resolution of which - in my memory, only those that existed between Comensi and Bergalei - he had sent Pinariius Apollinaris, and since he, as a first step for the stubborn absence of my uncle, later also under the principality of Gaius, he neglected - certainly not a fool - to produce a report on what was bot required; and since then Camurius Statutus notified me that the land and the forests are for the most part of my personal property: I sent to the scene Julius Planta, my friend and companion, who called my attorneys - both those who were in the other region, both those in the area - with the utmost precision conducted the inquiry and instructed the question; for all other matters, I delegate to him to settle and to decide, according to me the solutions proposed in the report which he produced. As for the condition of Anauni, of Sinduni and Tulliassi, a portion of which it is said that the complaint has found to be attributed to the Tridentini, some even attributed, although I realize that this category of people has not based their Roman citizenship on a sufficiently well-founded source, however, since it is said that they have been owned for a long period of use, and that you are so fused with Tridentini by not being able to be separated without serious damage to the beautiful town hall, it allows for my claim they continue to be in legal status who they thought they had, and the more so because several of their condition is said to pay service even in my judgment hall, and some even have been officers of the troops, and that some people included in decurie in Rome will do the judges. Their agreement this benefit, with the result that they have entered into any store or any legal proceedings have taken as if they were Roman citizens, or among themselves, or with Tridentini or other, I order that is ratified; and the names of Roman citizens who had taken earlier, they give them to keep them."

== See also ==
- Corpus Inscriptionum Latinarum
- Ancient peoples of Italy
