= Baiuvarii =

Predecessors of Bavarians and Austrians

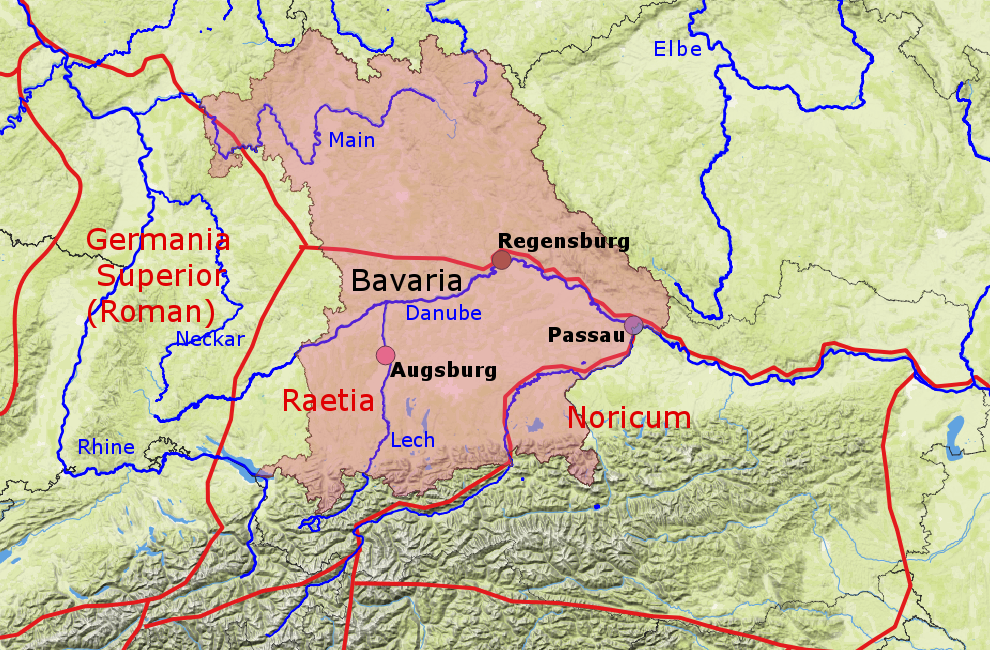
Modern Bavaria compared to Roman provinces

The Baiuvarii, Baiovari or early Bavarians were a Germanic people who are first mentioned in contemporary records starting in the 6th century, soon after the end of the Western Roman Empire. They originally lived in what had been the Roman province Raetia, south of the Danube, in what is now southern Bavaria.

The Baiuvarii were first noted to be ruling an area near the Lech river and little is known of them during this period. They became rulers of a large stem duchy within the Frankish empire, the medieval Duchy of Bavaria, which expanded and eventually stretched to include present day Austria.

The Baivarii are believed to have spoken a West Germanic dialect related to other southern German dialects which evolved to become medieval Old High German. The modern Bavarian language is in turn descended from Old High German and closely related to Standard German. Modern dialects of Bavarian are still spoken by Bavarians, Austrians and South Tyroleans.

== Language ==
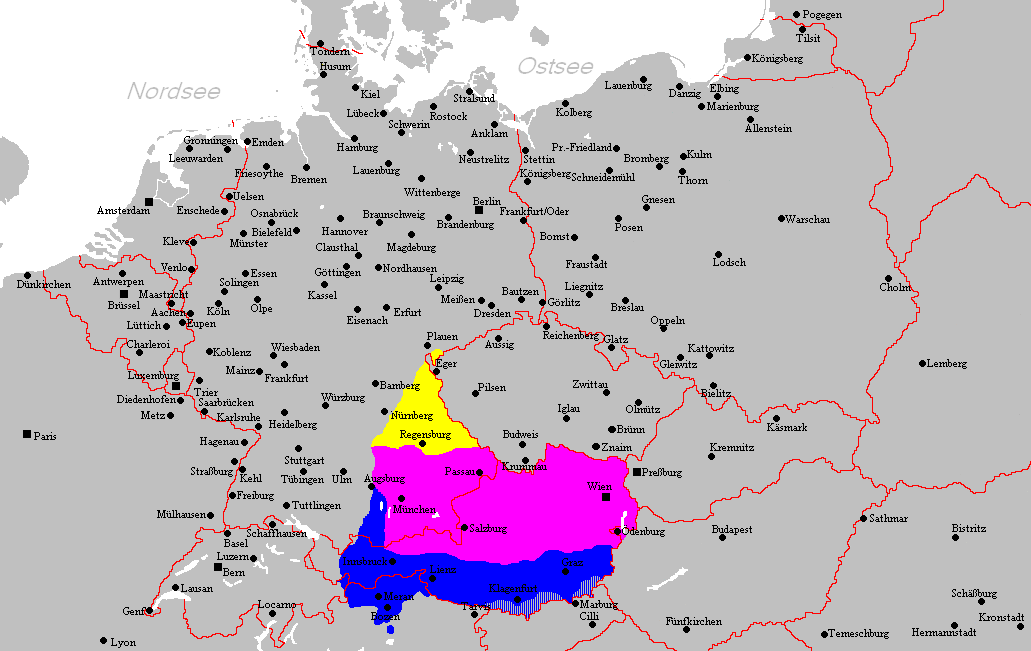
Map of the extent of the Bavarian, also known as Austro-Bavarian, dialects of the German language

Early evidence of the language of the Baiuvarii is limited to personal names and a few Runic inscriptions. However, by the 8th century AD, the Austro-Bavarian language was already well-established.

The language of the Baiuvarii was West Germanic, like its descendants medieval Old High German, and the modern Bavarian language. It was so similar to the contemporary languages of the neighbouring Alamanni, Thuringi, and Langobards, that it is difficult to tell them apart. This southern group of languages or dialects which are precursors to Old High German are sometimes distinguished from closely related northern dialects, such as those spoken by the Franks, as "Elbe Germanic". However, the model used to define this term is now considered obsolete, in favour of the idea that all or most of continental West Germanic languages were in one dialect continuum after the Migration period.

A peculiarity of Bavarian compared to its neighbours is that it appears to have loaned words from East Germanic languages, such as Gothic.

== Name ==
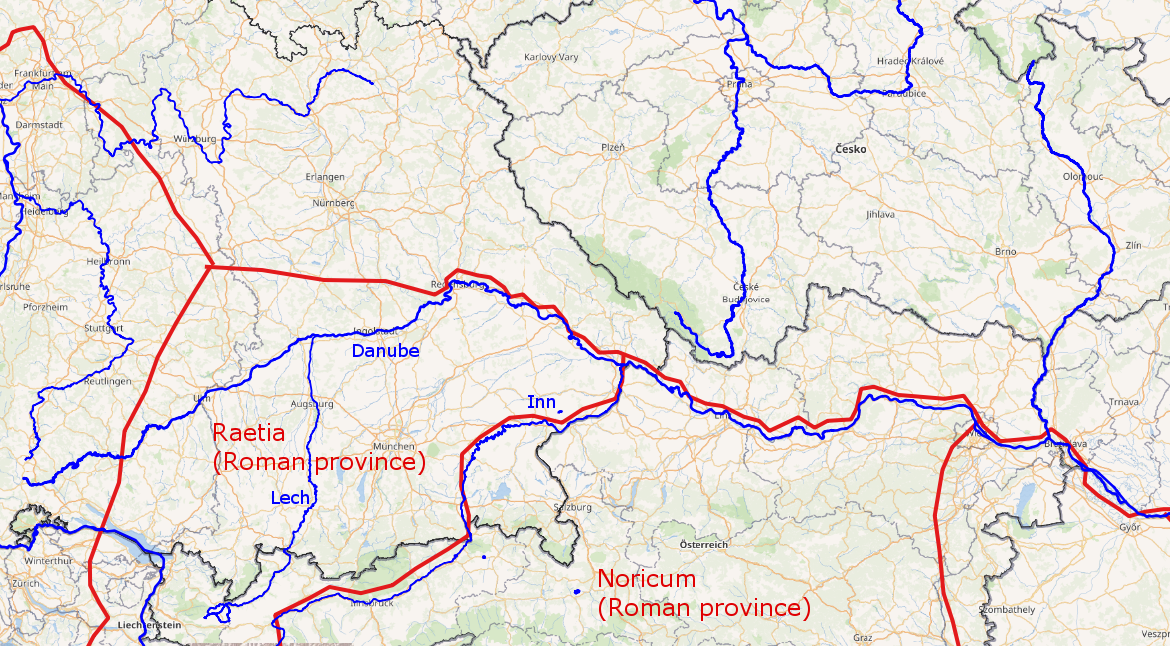
A map of the Roman provinces of Raetia and Noricum (red borders) showing the Lech, Danube and Inn rivers

Modern scholars reconstruct the original Germanic pronunciation before the first written forms as *Baiwari, and singular *Bai(a)warjōz. According to Rübekiel, the standard modern terms such as German Baj-u-waren and English Bai-u-varii are based on a misunderstanding of early medieval spellings such as Baiuuari, where "uu" really represented a single w-like consonant, and not an "uw" syllable.

The name of the Baiuvarii had many written variants, but these differences reflect different spelling conventions which were used. For example, the letters "b", "v", "u", "uu" and "o" could represent the same w-like sound in words from Germanic languages. Similarly, versions with a letter "g" such as Bogari, Baguvarii, are using that letter to represent a palatal glide, or y-like sound. In contrast, versions with an initial p such as Pagoarii, Paioarii, Peigiro reflect the normal Upper German version of the High German consonant shift, which still distinguishes southern dialects of German today, and so this represents a real variation in pronunciations.

Different etymologies have been proposed, but modern scholars normally understand the name as a compound of two elements: *Baia-/Baijo- which is believed to be a Germanic evolution from the pre-imperial Celtic tribal name Boii; and -warjōz which is a common Germanic suffix used to create the names of peoples, by associating them with nouns such as regional names.

== Earliest attestations ==
The Baiuvarii first appeared in records after 500 AD, in what had until then been the Roman province of Raetia. Before this, the biography of Severinus of Noricum in the late 5th century, written by his contemporary Eugippius, does not mention them at all. Instead, it describes the still Romanized region around Passau and Künzing in present day eastern Bavaria and within Roman Raetia, as coming under attack from Alemanni, Thuringians and Heruli. In 534 the Baiuavarii are also notably absent from the letter of the Frankish king Theudebert I (reigned 534-548) to the eastern emperor Justinian, although Theudebert was claiming to control the area. Similarly the contemporary 6th century historian Gregory of Tours mentioned Garilbald, the first known Duke of Bavaria, because he married the widow of Theudebert, but his whole history never mentions Bavaria. Hardt for example therefore suggests that the Baiuvarii "only visibly started to develop an identity as a people" after "the appointment by the Frankish king of a dux, who actively endeavoured to organize the various Germanic and Roman groups and units living in the former province of Rhaetia".

The earliest attestations of the Baiuvarii are the following, starting in the 6th century, when the term seems to have been new.

- Jordanes, writing in 551, described the Baiuvarii (manuscript spellings Baibaros, Baiobaros, Baioarios), already living east of the Alemanni and Suevi in 469/70.
- Various versions of the Frankish Table of Nations, starting from about 520, use spellings Baioarius, Baweros, Baioeros, Bawarios, Baioarios, Boguarii and Bogari, and describe the Baiuvarii as a people with kinship to the Burgundians, Thuringians and Lombards (but not the Alemanni).
- Venantius Fortunatus (fl. about 550-600) mentioned a region called Baivaria near the Lech river, and a person who was a Baiovarius. This was near the country of the Breuni who still lived near the river Inn. The Lech flows northwards from the Austrian alps to the German Danube. The Inn was the boundary between Raetia and Noricum, and today forms part of the border between Germany and Austria. This seems to indicate that the first Baiuvarii were in a relatively small area.
- The Ravenna Cosmography, which is a 7th-century text based upon older sources, possibly from the 5th and 6th century, briefly mentions that the alps divide the "Ranici" from Italy. Modern scholars believe the word Ranici is corrupted, but in any case it says that these Ranici are "now" ruled by the "Bauuari" (quae modo a Bauvariis dominatur).

== Possible sources of the name ==
The Baiuvarii probably did not exist under that name before the 5th century. However, the Boii, who seem to be the basis of the first element of the Baiuvarii name, almost disappeared from the written record around the time when the Roman empire began, centuries earlier. The form of the name is Germanic, both because of the conversion of the o-sound to an a-sound, and also the -varii suffix. This has led scholars to propose different ways in which the Baiuvarii name can be indirectly derived from the much older name of the Boii tribe. By explaining this, scholars also hope to get indications about how the Baiuvarii came into existence.

A common and old proposal is that the Baiuvarii name somehow evolved from the classical version of the geographical term "Bohemia" which was already used by Latin and Greek writers in the first century AD. Strabo called it Buiaimon, Velleius Paterculus called it Boiohaemum, and Tacitus called it Boiemum. Modern scholars see this as a Germanic word, coined by the Suebi who settled there under Maroboduus, long after the Boii departed. The second component is Germanic *haim-, the source of modern English "home" and modern German "Heim". One of the last classical reports of this name is the 2nd-century mention of a people called the Bainochaemae. Claudius Ptolemy described them in his Geography as living near the Elbe, east of the Melibokus mountains, and north of the Asciburgius mountains. According to this proposal, the Baivari migrated south or east from the original Bohemia, which is believed to have been somewhere in the present-day Czech Republic. However, the "haim" part of the placename, which would have made the evidence for this specific etymology clear, does not appear in the name of Bavarians, leaving only the name of the Boii.

There are proposals that the name does not come from Bohemia at all, but directly from the Boii name itself, which was preserved in more areas to the east of Raetia (which would become the core of Bavaria), and not just in Bohemia. Examples which have been proposed include the following:

- Within Roman Pannonia there was also a civitas of the Boii which continued to exist within the empire. It lay on the Danube near present day Vienna, in the north west of the Roman province of Pannonia, bordering on Noricum. By about 400 AD, when the Notitia Dignitatum was made, this area's military defence included Suebian Marcomanni troops many of whom had by this time been moved south of the Danube, into the empire.
- The Ravenna Cosmography mentions a country called Baias, which was part of a mountainous region it called Ungani, stretching from the southern Elbe far to the east. To the north of Ungani was Saxony, and to the south was Pannonia.
- Ptolemy in the second century reported a "large nation" called the Baiani (Ancient Greek: Βαιανοί) or Baimi (Βαίμοι) between the "Luna Forest" and the Danube. This population is believed to have been the "Vannius Kingdom", which was established on Quadi territory (which had once been Boii territory) after a civil war in the first century AD.
- Boiodurum, was the older settlement next to the Roman fort of Passau, and its name indicates that it was in a region still associated with the Boii in Roman times. In the Notitia Dignitatum Boiodurum's tribune is under the Dux of Noricum Ripensis and Pannonia I, while the tribune of Batavis (Passau) is under Raetian command. In Ptolemy's Geography it is in Vindelicia (in Raetia).
- Another name associated by scholars with the Boii name in late antiquity is the country called Bainaib, possibly from *Bain-haim, recorded in the Origo Gentis Langobardorum as one of the places the Langobards stopped on their trek from the lower Elbe to the Middle Danube. It came between places called Antaib and Burgundaib.
- The name of the Baiuvarii is probably also preserved in the list of great rulers of peoples in the Old English poem about Widsith, the traveller. It lists "Becca" as ruler of the Baningas, along with better-known rulers such as Attila who ruled the Huns, and Ermanric who ruled the Goths.

There are also several proposals about the ethnic background of the population who brought the Baiuvarii name with them to Raetia, and made it the name of the mixed community. However, most of the proposals involve the Suebian Germanic peoples to the east of Raetia such as the Marcomanni and Quadi, who disappeared from contemporary records during the time of Hun rule in the area.

A third proposal is that the name of the Boii still survived in Raetia itself, making no migration necessary. In other words, people who still identified themselves as dwellers upon old lands of the pre-imperial Celtic Boii were still living in the Norican–Raetian region, and were the name-giving element in the mixed population that remained there after Rome abandoned Raetia. According to Karl Bosl in 1971, Bavarian migration to present-day Bavaria is a legend, and Walter Goffart more recently agreed that there is no reason to assume any single large immigration in order to explain the 5th century origins of the Baiuvarii.

In the early first century Strabo described the Boii living next to the Raeti and the Vindelici in Raetia, associating them with areas as far west as Lake Constance.

== Modern commentary ==
Although the details are unknown, the Baiuvarii are believed to have incorporated elements from several Germanic peoples who lived longer in the regions surrounding Raetia. This could have included the Rugii, Sciri, Marcomanni, Heruli, Quadi, Alemanni, Naristi, Thuringi and Langobards. They might also have included non-Germanic descendants of the Roman-era Raetians who probably spoke Romance dialects.

The Baiuvarii emerged only after about 500, in the situation created after Odoacer (died 493) destroyed the Rugian kingdom just to the east of Bavaria in 487. He and his successor as king of Italy, Theoderic the Great (died 526), both had their roots in the Middle Danubian area and led large numbers of soldiers from there to Italy. The Rugian kings had ruled the countryside on the Danube west of Vienna, in what had been the Roman province of Noricum, and this included the civitas named after the Boii, in the Roman province of Pannonia .

The Rugian territory was soon taken over in this same period by Langobards, a Germanic-speaking people who had moved from the Lower Elbe in the north, and filled the power vacuum in the Middle Danube. The Bavarians first appear at about this same time, to the west of the Lombards. However, after the Lombards also proceeded to migrate to Italy in 568, the region east of the Bavarians was dominated by the Pannonian Avars, and Slavic languages became important in that region.

It has been proposed that the Baiuvarii became important and distinct from their similar Alemannic and Langobard neighbours, under the influence of greater powers interested in the area. First Theodoric the Great, who ruled in Italy, and later the Frankish kings Theuderic I (died 534) and his son Theudebert I (died 548), seem to have controlled Bavaria from a distance.

Theudebert claimed in a letter to the Byzantine emperor Justinian that he controlled the area from the North Sea to Pannonia, which would have included Bavaria. After his death, his uncle Chlothar I appointed Garibald I as dux of Bavaria. Garibald established the Agilolfing dynasty with his power base at Augsburg or Regensburg.

== Archaeology ==
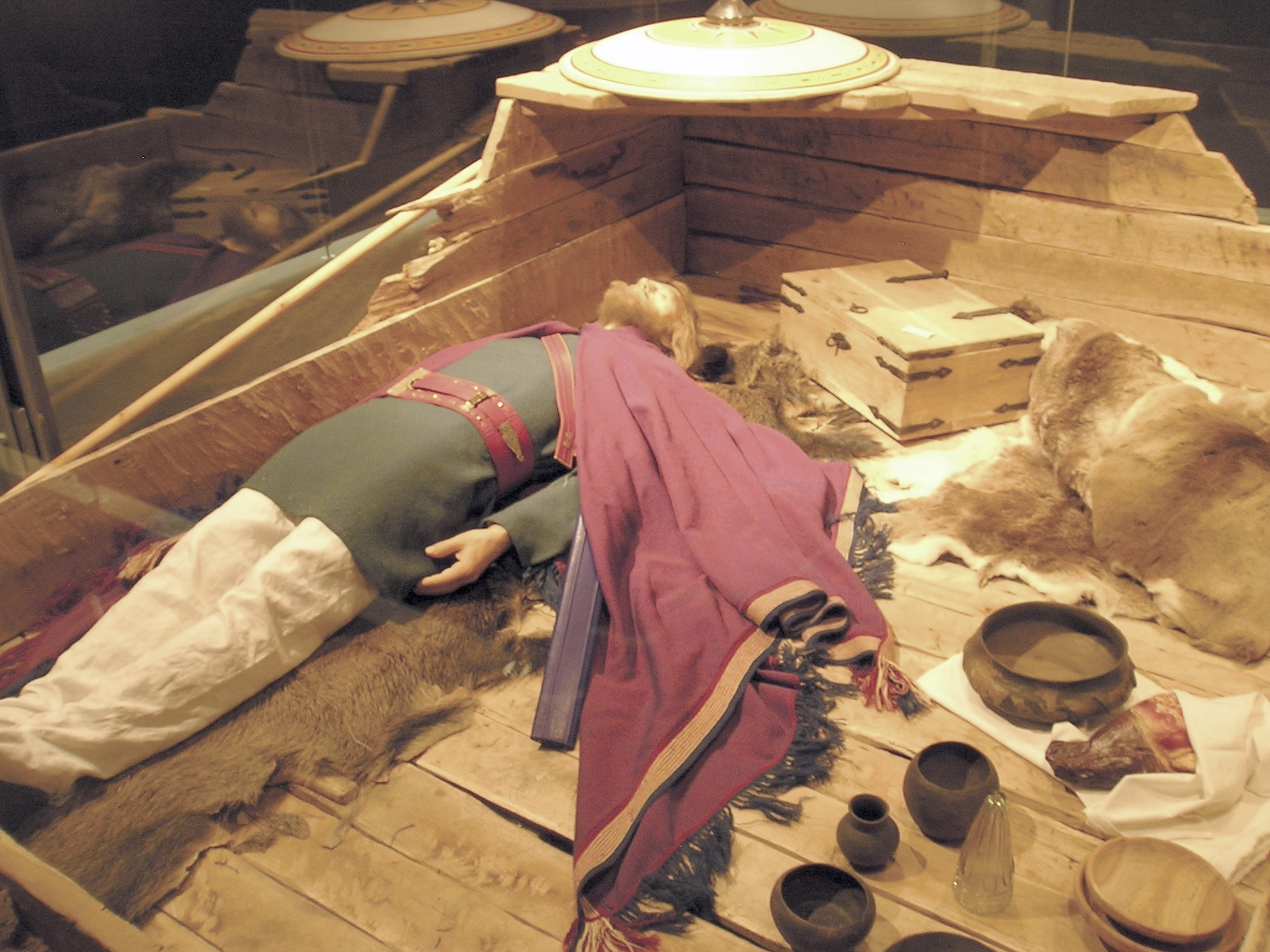
Reconstruction of the grave of the Kemathen warrior, of the Friedenhain culture

In the 20th century the early Baiuvarii were associated with Friedenhain-Přešťovice ceramics, but this is no longer accepted by scholars.

The funerary traditions of the Baiuvarii are similar to those of the Alemanni, but quite different from those of the Thuringi.

The Baiuvarii are distinguished by the presence of individuals with artificially deformed craniums in their cemeteries. These individuals were predominantly female; there is no undisputed evidence of males with artificially deformed skulls in Bavaria. Genetic and archeological evidence shows that these women were migrants from eastern cultures, who married Bavarii males, suggesting the importance of exogamy within the Bavarii culture. The migrant women were fully integrated in to Bavarii culture.

== Genetics ==
In 2018, a genetic study published in the Proceedings of the National Academy of Sciences of the United States of America analysed genomic data from 36 individuals from archaeological sites in present-day Bavaria, mostly dating to the late 5th and early 6th centuries. The men, together with most women who did not have artificially deformed skulls, were genetically relatively homogeneous and showed predominantly northern/central European ancestry. In contrast, women with artificially deformed skulls were much more genetically diverse. Most showed substantial ancestry associated with southern or southeastern Europe, particularly populations related to present-day Bulgaria and Romania, while one individual also had about 20% East Asian ancestry. The authors concluded that these women were probably immigrants, mainly from southeastern Europe, and suggested that their migration may have been connected with exogamous marriage and alliances between local communities and groups farther east. Predicted pigmentation also differed between the groups. Around 80% of individuals with normal or intermediate skulls had a high probability of blue eyes and blond hair, whereas about 80% of women with deformed skulls were predicted to have brown eyes, with brown and blond hair both represented. The authors noted that the immigrant women may therefore have stood out physically from the local population because of the combination of their elongated skulls and differing eye, hair and possibly skin pigmentation. Comparing the samples with a Roman soldier who lived in the area about 200 years earlier revealed no shared recent ancestry, which, according to the authors, argues against "significant admixture" between more southern Roman populations and the local individuals. Among modern populations, the surveyed individuals with normal skulls were found to be most closely related to modern-day Germans.

In 2024 Gretzinger et al. published new Iron Age data from southwestern Germany and compared it with previously published early medieval genomes from southern Germany. They concluded that in modern terms the Iron Age Hallstatt population was closest to French, Spanish and Belgians. In contrast, by early medieval times, Alemannic and Bavarian populations were genetically indistinguishable from Iron Age and medieval populations in northern Germany and Scandinavia. The change was also associated with the appearance of paternal lineages such as I1-M253. The authors saw this change as consistent with "the arrival of Germanic-speaking tribes", but the migration could not be dated precisely. They proposed that Roman and Late Iron Age samples suggest that much of the earlier southern German gene pool persisted until the fourth or fifth century AD. They also noted that compared to medieval southern Germans, present-day southern Germans have an increased amount of the ancestral components more common in southern Europe.

An archaeogenetic study published in 2026 in Nature examined demographic changes in southern Germany between the early 5th and late 7th centuries, including cemeteries at Altheim near Landshut and Weilheim in Upper Bavaria. Genetic links between individuals buried hundreds of kilometres apart indicated long-distance migrations involving individuals and small kin groups. At Altheim, the earliest population (400–470), predating the first written references to the Baiuvarii, had predominantly northern European ancestry. From around 470 and during the 6th-century period when the Baiuvarii appeared, the studied population grew and became more genetically diverse, with less northern European ancestry, and more of the ancestry associated with Roman Southeastern Europe and Central Italy which had already been present in nearby Roman military communities. The authors associate this change with movement from Roman settlements into rural areas following the decline of Roman institutions. Over the following 150 years, intermarriage produced a population genetically resembling modern Central Europeans, including southern Germans. The authors also suggest that networks among people of northern ancestry may have contributed to the spread of early Germanic dialects and the emergence of Old High German as the dominant vernacular.

== Origin myth ==
A medieval origin story exists for the Baiuvarii, the Annolied written in the 11th century, says that the Bavarian tribe came long ago from Armenia, "where Noah came out of the ark". The leaders of the Bavarian army are said to have been Duke Boimunt and his brother Ingram. The story was also reflected in the Song of Roland, which mentions a Bavarian duke Naimes. Also the epic Karl written by "Der Stricker" says that Naymes, the Bavarian duke, was born in "Ormenîe".

These origin-legends stem from learned medieval conceptions.

== Law code ==
A collection of Bavarian tribal laws was compiled in the 8th century. This document is known as Lex Baiuvariorum. Elements of it possibly date back to the 6th century. It is very similar to Lex Thuringorum, which was the legal code of the Thuringi, with whom the Baiuvarii had close relations.

== Christianity ==
By the 8th century, many Baiuvarii had converted to Christianity.

== See also ==
- Elbe Germanic peoples
- Irminones

== Sources ==
- Beck, Heinrich (1973), "Bajuwaren I. Philologisches", in Beck, Heinrich; Geuenich, Dieter; Steuer, Heiko (eds.), Reallexikon der Germanischen Altertumskunde, vol. 1 (2 ed.), De Gruyter, pp. 601–606, ISBN 978-3-11-004489-8
- Diesenberger, Maximilian [in German] (2018). "Baiuvari and Bavaria". In Nicholson, Oliver (ed.). The Oxford Dictionary of Late Antiquity. Oxford University Press. p. 195. doi:10.1093/acref/9780198662778.001.0001. ISBN 978-0-19-174445-7.
- Fries-Knoblach, Janine; Steuer, Heiko (2014). "Introduction". In Fries-Knoblach, Janine; Steuer, Heiko; Hines, John (eds.). The Baiuvarii and Thuringi: An Ethnographic Perspective. Boydell & Brewer Ltd. pp. 1–10. ISBN 978-1-84383-915-6.
- Goffart, Walter (2010). Barbarian Tides: The Migration Age and the Later Roman Empire. University of Pennsylvania Press. ISBN 978-0-8122-0028-7.
- Green, D. H. (2014). "The Boii, Bohemia, Bavaria". In Fries-Knoblach, Janine; Steuer, Heiko; Hines, John (eds.). The Baiuvarii and Thuringi: An Ethnographic Perspective. Boydell & Brewer Ltd. pp. 11–22. ISBN 978-1-84383-915-6.
- Hamann, Stefanie (2018), "Bajuwaren II. Historisches (Stand: 1973)", in Brather, Sebastian; Heizmann, Wilhelm; Patzold, Steffen (eds.), Germanische Altertumskunde Online, De Gruyter
- Hammer, Carl I. (2007). From Ducatus to Regnum: Ruling Bavaria under the Merovingians and Early Carolingians. Brepols.
- Hardt, Matthias (2003), "The Bavarians", Regna and Gentes, pp. 429–461, doi:10.1163/9789047404255_018, ISBN 978-90-474-0425-5
- Harm, Volker (2013), ""Elbgermanisch", "Weser-Rhein-Germanisch" und die Grundlagen des Althochdeutschen", in Nielsen; Stiles (eds.), Unity and Diversity in West Germanic and the Emergence of English, German, Frisian and Dutch, North-Western European Language Evolution, vol. 66, pp. 79–99
- Haubrichs, Wolfgang [in German] (2014). "Baiovarii, Romania, And Others". In Fries-Knoblach, Janine; Steuer, Heiko; Hines, John (eds.). The Baiuvarii and Thuringi: An Ethnographic Perspective. Boydell & Brewer Ltd. pp. 23–82. ISBN 978-1-84383-915-6.
- Kovács, Péter (2013), "Territoria, pagi and vici in Pannonia", STUDIA EPIGRAPHICA IN MEMORIAM GÉZA ALFÖLDY
- Reimitz, Helmut (2022), "When the Bavarians Became Bavarian. The Politicization of Ethnicity and Crystallization of Ethnic Identities in the Shadow of Carolingian Rule (8th to 9th Century)", Emerging Powers in Eurasian Comparison, 200–1100, pp. 137–178, doi:10.1163/9789004519916_006
- Rübekeil, Ludwig (2018), "Bajuwaren I. Philologisches (Stand: 2018)", in Brather, Sebastian; Heizmann, Wilhelm; Patzold, Steffen (eds.), Germanische Altertumskunde Online, De Gruyter
- Veeramah, Krishna R. (27 March 2018). "Population genomic analysis of elongated skulls reveals extensive female-biased immigration in Early Medieval Bavaria". Proceedings of the National Academy of Sciences of the United States of America. 115 (13). National Academy of Sciences: 3494–3499. Bibcode:2018PNAS..115.3494V. doi:10.1073/pnas.1719880115. PMC 5879695. PMID 29531040.
