= Kemathen warrior =

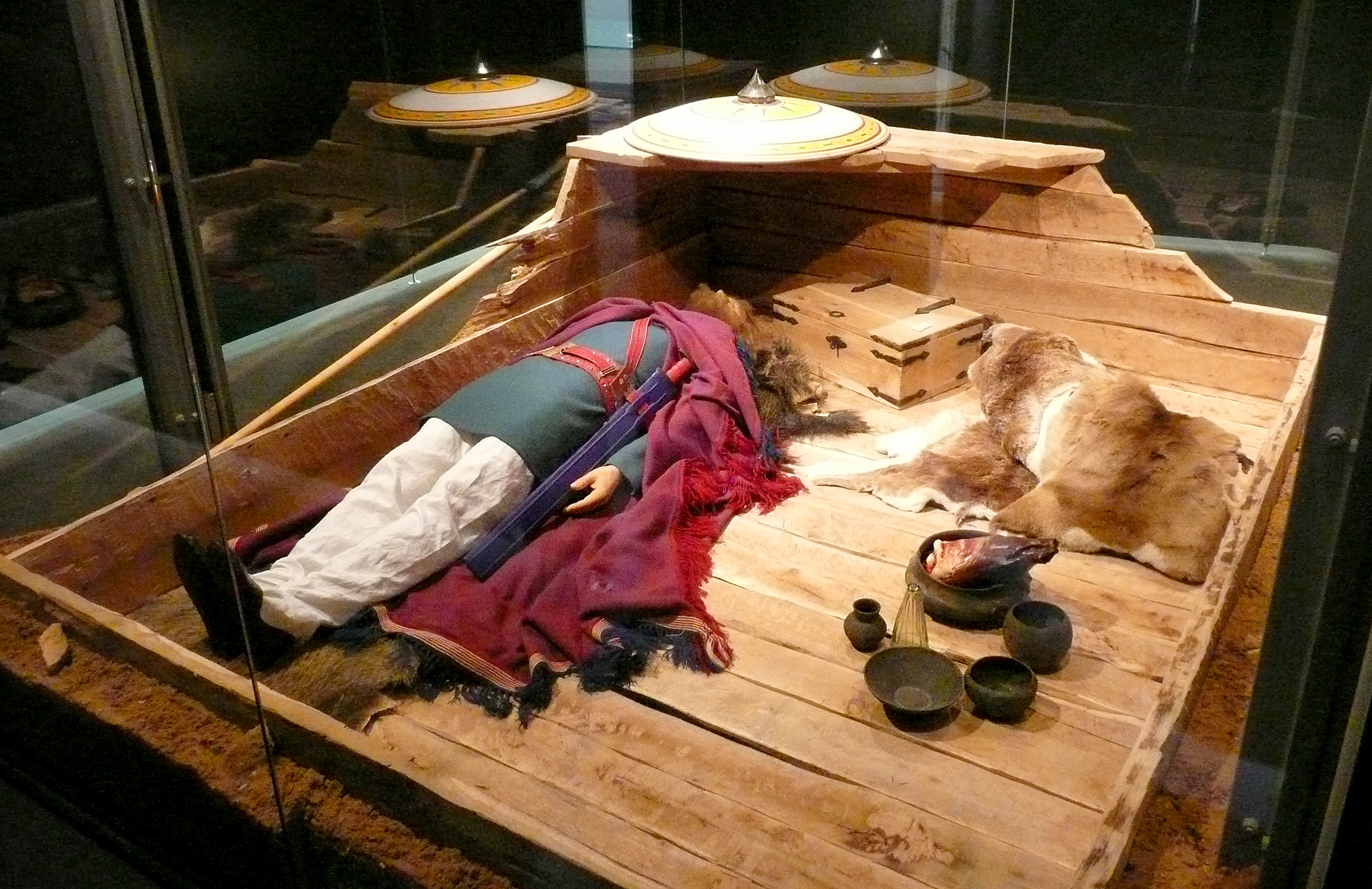
Museal reconstruction of the grave of the Kemathen warrior.

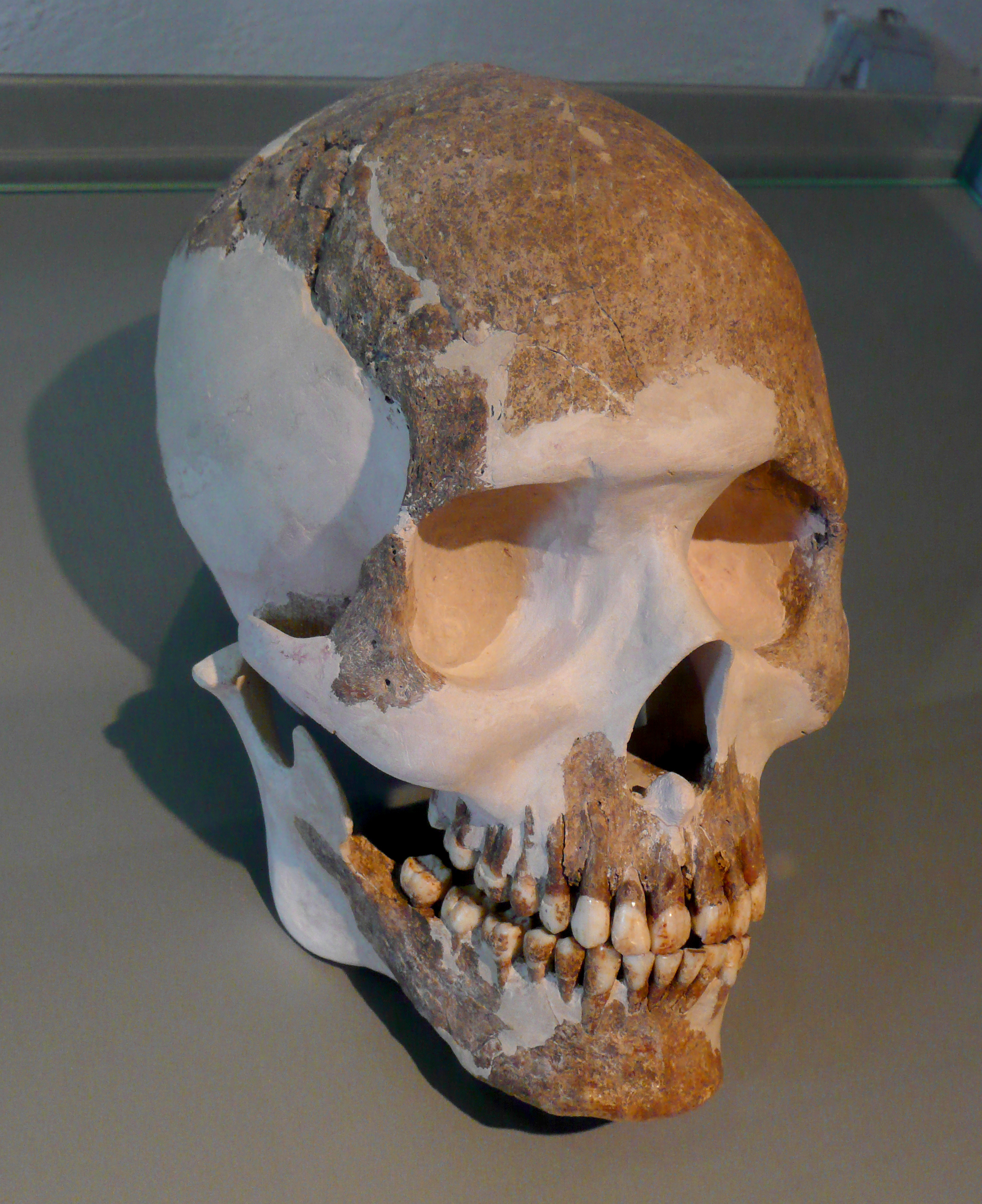
Skull of the warrior.

The Kemathen warrior was a Germanic chieftain and mercenary who lived near the present-day town of Kipfenberg, Bavaria. The individual grave, which was discovered in 1990, contained not only parts of the skeleton of the 30-year-old man, but also numerous grave goods that distinguish him as a Roman officer as well as a Germanic chieftain. His skeleton and the grave finds, together with a faithful replica of the tomb, are in the Roman and Bavarian Museum in Kipfenberg.

== Location of the grave ==
The warrior grave was discovered on September 28, 1990 on the occasion of a land consolidation measure in the corridor of Kemathen, a district of the Kipfenberg market. It is located in the Altmühl valley approx. 25 km north of the then Roman imperial border, which at that time was relocated back to the Danube. The site is centrally located in the distribution area of the group, an archaeological group of finds in 5th century Bohemia and Bavaria.

== Funeral ==
In contrast to the usual cremation, the man received an elaborate burial in a richly furnished individual grave. This illustrates the prominent social position of the dead. The wooden chamber grave was originally covered by a Hill and therefore clearly visible to everyone. It was located on the edge of a settlement that existed at the same time and had a size of almost 3 m^{2}. The warrior was laid down in a stretched supine position almost north–south, with the head facing north. He was originally bedded on an animal skin, in full gear and clothing.

=== Equipment of the grave ===
The man's clothing and grave goods are culturally inconsistent and point to both Germanic and Roman customs. On the left side of the dead man lay a three-inch long, wide iron sword, which was sheathed and encircled by his left arm. In the area of the sword hilt a sword pearl was found, which was cut in the shape of a disk from the rose of a deer antler. The sword came from a Roman workshop.

On his left ring finger he wore a ring made of spirally wound, strong silver wire. Next to it was a two-row crest and a chert artifact that had once served as a flint. Both were probably kept in a belt pouch that has not been preserved. The dead man wore a 10 cm wide, magnificent Roman military belt with bronze fittings, which was made in northeastern Gaul and subsequently repaired and supplemented in Raetia near the burial site.

A simple iron brooch was found on his right shoulder that held his coat together. On the back there was a pocket with an iron knife. The shield was placed above the head, of which only the handle and the conical shield boss have been preserved. They are both made of iron, with the tip of the shield boss made of bronze. There were also iron fittings at the head end, which presumably came from an "officers' box".

Also on the left side of the body were the food additions, somewhat separated: the bones of a young pig. A 18.5 cm high Roman pointed beaker with a thread layer made of greenish-yellow glass. Five handmade, dark brown to black clay vessels. Two vessels, a mug, a plate with a stand ring and a large bowl of the Friedenhain type. The latter has inclined fluting on the fold, the raised ribs of which are profiled.

== Temporal and biographical classification ==
The Kemethan warrior served in the late Roman army, returned to the border region north of the Danube and was buried there around 100 years before the Bavarians appear in the historical record. The warrior grave in Kemathen is the first body grave to be found by the Friedenhain group in Bavaria. However, whether the Friedenhain group is the origin of the Bavarians is a traditional hypothesis that is being questioned by modern research.

Presentation of the excavation finds In order to present the excavation finds, the Roman and Bavarian Museum was founded at Kipfenberg Castle. Since 1999 it has been showing the original finds and the reconstructed skeleton from the warrior grave in Kemathen as well as a true-to-original replica of the grave complex. In addition, excavation finds from the area of the Böhming Roman fort and a model of this fort are shown in the museum.

== Bibliography ==
- Karl-Heinz Rieder: Das Kriegergrab von Kemathen. Ein hochrangiger Germane des frühen 5. Jahrhunderts mit zahlreichen Attributen eines römischen Offiziers. In: Bayerische Archäologie. Jahrgang 2017, Nummer 3, S. 23–27.
- Brigitte Haas-Gebhard: Die Baiuvaren: Archäologie und Geschichte. Pustet, Regensburg 2013, ISBN 978-3-7917-2482-9.
- Roland Gschlößl: Die "echten" Bayern sind längst ausgestorben... In: Bayerische Archäologie. Jahrgang 2011, Nummer 1, S. 16–21.
- Hubert Fehr: Überlegungen zu den Anfängen der Bajuwaren unter besonderer Berücksichtigung des Ingolstädter Raums. In: Bayern und Ingolstadt in der Karolingerzeit (= Beiträge zur Geschichte Ingolstadts. Band 5). Stadt Ingolstadt [u. a.], Ingolstadt 2008, ISBN 978-3-932113-51-2, S. 89–99.
- Bernd Steidl: Zeitgenosse der Nibelungen – Der Krieger von Kemathen. In: Archäologie in Bayern: Fenster zur Vergangenheit. Pustet, Regensburg 2006, ISBN 978-3-7917-2002-9, S. 234.
- Karl Heinz Rieder: Kemathen – Der erste echte Bajuware. In: Bayerischer Genossenschaftskalender. Jahrgang 1998, S. 88–91 (online).
- Erwin Keller, Karl Heinz Rieder: Eine germanische Kriegerbestattung des frühen 5. Jahrhunderts n. Chr. aus Kemathen. In: Das Archäologische Jahr in Bayern. Jahrgang 1991, erschienen 1992, S. 132–137.
