= Brigantii =

Gallic tribe

The Brigantii (Gaulish: Brigantioi, 'the eminent, high ones') were a Gallic tribe who lived southeast of Lake Constance (Lacus Brigantinus), in the area of present-day Bregenz (Brigantion), in Austria's state of Vorarlberg, during the Roman era.

== Name ==
They are mentioned as Brigántioi (Βριγάντιοι) by Strabo (early 1st c. AD). An identification with the Brixentes, a tribe listed on the Tropaeum Alpium, has been proposed by Ernst Meyer.

The ethnic name Brigantii is a Latinized form of Gaulish Brigantioi. It derives from the stem briganti-, meaning 'high, elevated', which can be compared with the name of their chief town Brigantion ('eminence'; Latin Brigantium), also attested in other toponyms at the origin of the modern Briançon, Brégançon and Briantes. The same stem can also be found in name of the Celtic goddess Brigantia.

== Geography ==
The Brigantii lived southeast of Lake Constance (Lacus Brigantinus), in Raetia. The Barrington Atlas locates their territory north of the Vennones, west of the Estiones, east of the Lentienses.

Their chief town was known as Brigantium ('high place'; modern Bregenz). The settlement was located on the northeastern bay of Lake Constance, at an intersection of important east–west and north–south traffic routes. Late La Tène finds from the Ölrain plateau suggest the existence of a pre-Roman oppidum in the upper part of town.
