= Isarci =

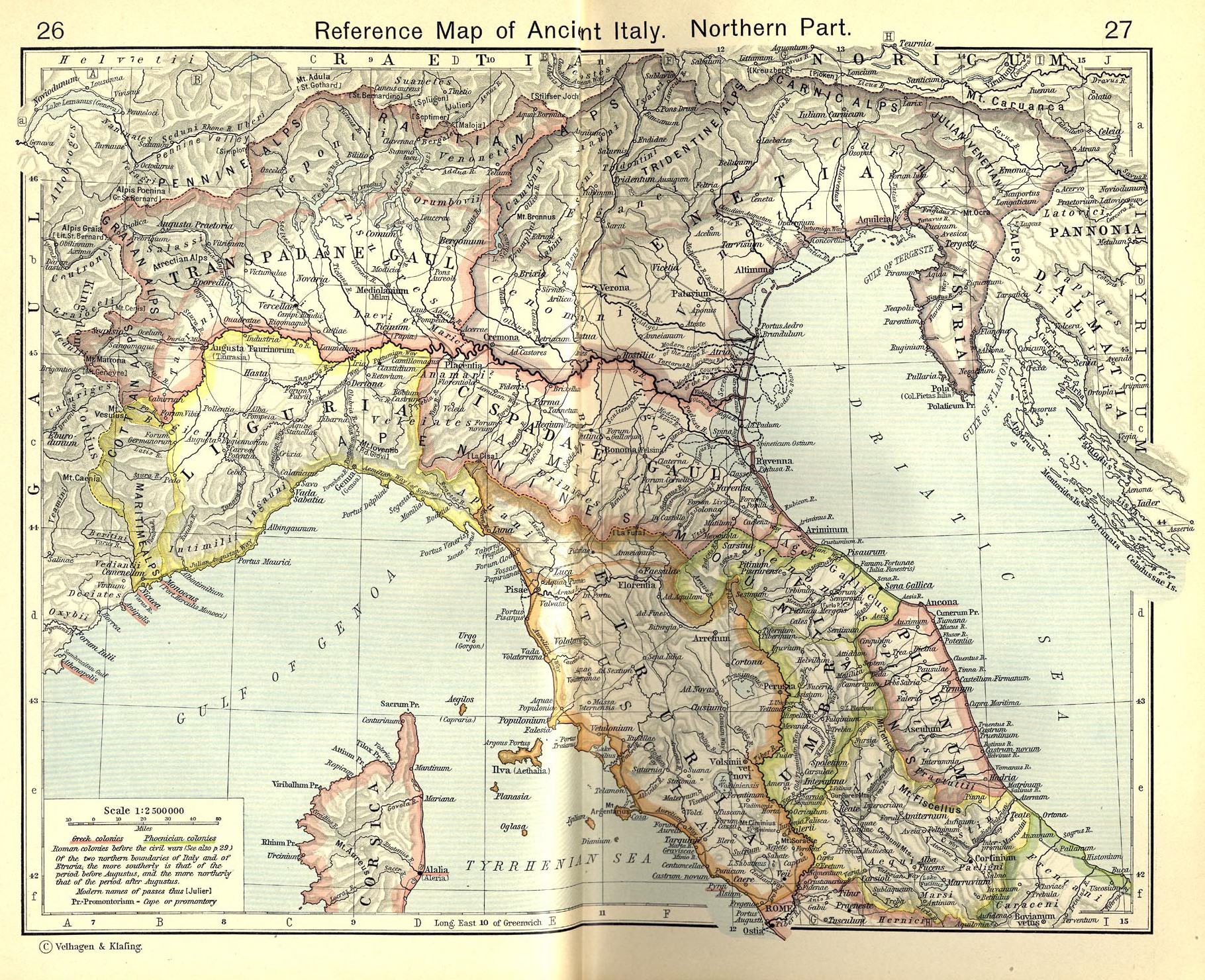
Ancient Italy - Northern Part from Shepherd's Historical Atlas showing the Isarci at the northeastern corner of Venetia

The Isarci were an ancient Alpine people who settled in the Eisack Valley (Italian: Val d'Isarco).

They were a Rhaetian tribe dwelling about the mouth of the river Isarco, from which their name appears to be derived.

Val d'Isarco is also referred to as Val de Sarra or Sarcha, near Val Camonica in South Tyrol in references to the Isarci.

Little is recorded about them, other than that they were conquered by Rome during the campaigns of Augustus against the Raeti and other alpine tribes that were undertaken by generals Druzus the Elder and Tiberius, the future emperor, between 16 and 15 BC. Their name is in fifth place in the Trophy of the Alps (Tropaeum Alpium), a Roman monument erected in 7-6 BC located near the French town of La Turbie to celebrate the submission of the alpine populations:

GENTES ALPINAE DEVICTAE
TRVMPILINI
CAMVNNI
VENOSTES
VENNONETES
ISARCI ...

— Tropaeum Alpium inscription

which can be translated:

Conquered alpine peoples: Triumpilini, Camunni, Vennonetes, Venostes, Isarci ...

== See also ==
- Tropaeum Alpium
- Eisacktal
