= Calucones =

Ancient Alpine tribe

The Calucones were a Gallic or Rhaetian tribe dwelling around present-day Chur (eastern Switzerland) during the Roman period.

== Name ==
They are mentioned as Calucones (var. Callucones, Allucones) by Pliny (1st c. AD), and as kaloúkōnes (καλούκωνες; var. καλούκονες, κουλούκωνες) by Ptolemy (2nd c. AD).

The etymology of the name remains debated. It could go back to a Celtic form calo-uco-on-, derived from the stem calo- ('call'). Alternatively, it may be derived from a stem *calu- ('hard') attached to -cones ('wolves'), and translated as 'hard wolves'.

An homonym tribe, the Kaloukones, lived further north, near the Germanic Suebi.

== Geography ==
The Calucones probably dwelled around present-day Chur (Curia), in the Canton of Grisons.

The Barrington Atlas locates their territory north of the Suanetes and Rugusci, west of the Focunates and Venostes, south of the Vennones.

== History ==
They are mentioned by Pliny the Elder as one of the Alpine tribes conquered by Rome in 16–15 BC, and whose name was engraved on the Tropaeum Alpium.

== See also ==
- Rhaetian people
