= Osterfeuerkopf =

Mountain in Bavaria, Germany

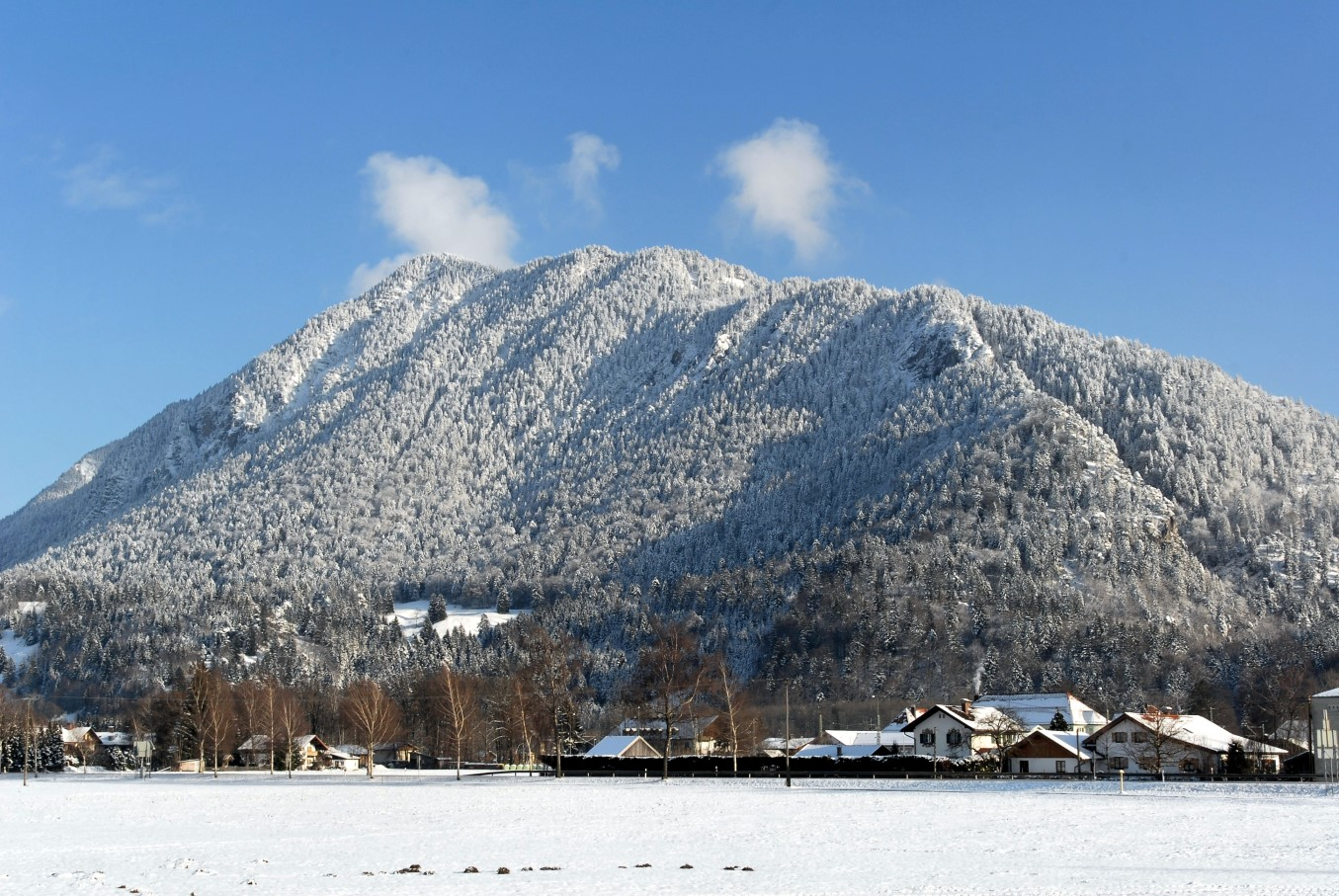

Highest point
- Elevation: 1,368 m (4,488 ft)
- Coordinates: 47°36′11″N 11°12′54″E

Geography
- Location: Bavaria, Germany

Osterfeuerkopf is a mountain of Bavaria, Germany. It is located close to the Southern German city of Garmisch-Partenkirchen and Germany's tallest peak, the Zugspitze.

In 2010, a German-Spanish expedition climbed to the top of the mountain, marking the first joint-expedition from these two European Union member states.
