= Catenates =

Gallic tribe

The Catenates or Cattenates were a Gallic tribe dwelling between the Isar and Inn rivers during the Iron Age.

== Name ==
They are mentioned as Catenates (var. catte-) by Pliny (1st c. AD).

The ethnic name probably contains the Gaulish stem catu-, meaning 'battle'. Patrizia de Bernardo Stempel has proposed to interpret the name as *Catu-(g)nat-es ('those born in battle').

== Geography ==
The Catenates lived between the Isar and Inn rivers. The Barrington Atlas locates their territory south of the Rucinates, east of the Vindelici, north of the Baiovarii. They were part of the Vindelici.

== History ==
They are mentioned by Pliny the Elder as one of the Alpine tribes conquered by Rome in 16–15 BC, and whose name was engraved on the Tropaeum Alpium.
