= Genauni =

Ancient Gallic tribe

The Genauni or Genaunes (Gaulish: *Genaunoi, earlier *Gēnomnoi, 'the natives') were a Gallic tribe dwelling in the eastern valley of the Inn river, in Tyrol, during the Iron Age and the Roman period.

== Name ==
They are mentioned as Genaunos by Horace (1st c. BC), as Genaúnōn (Γεναύνων) by Strabo (early 1st c. AD), and as Genaunes by Pliny (1st c. AD).

The ethnic name Genauni is a latinized form of Gaulish *Genaunoi (sing. Genaunos), which can be translated 'the natives'. It stems from an earlier form *Géno-mnoi, based on the stem gen(o)- ('descendants, family').

== Geography ==
The Genauni lived in the eastern valley of the Inn river, in Raetia. The Barrington Atlas locates their territory north of the Focunates, east of the Breuni, south of the Estiones, Licates and Cosuanetes, west of the Vennones.

== History ==
They are mentioned by Pliny the Elder as one of the Alpine tribes conquered by Rome in 16–15 BC, and whose name was engraved on the Tropaeum Alpium.
