= Asciburgius =

Mountain in Germany

The Asciburgius mons or Askibourgion oros is a mountain of greater Germany mentioned by the ancient geographer, Ptolemy, of unknown location today. Ptolemy does give us enough information to speculate where the mountain probably is, saying it was between the Elbe river and the Oder river or in other words, the Giant Mountains range. It is also mentioned by Tacitus in his Germania.
