= Ölrain =

Mountain in Bavaria, Germany

Coordinates: 47°36′N 11°15′E

Highest point
- Elevation: 1,542 m (5,059 ft)

Geography
- Location: Bavaria, Germany

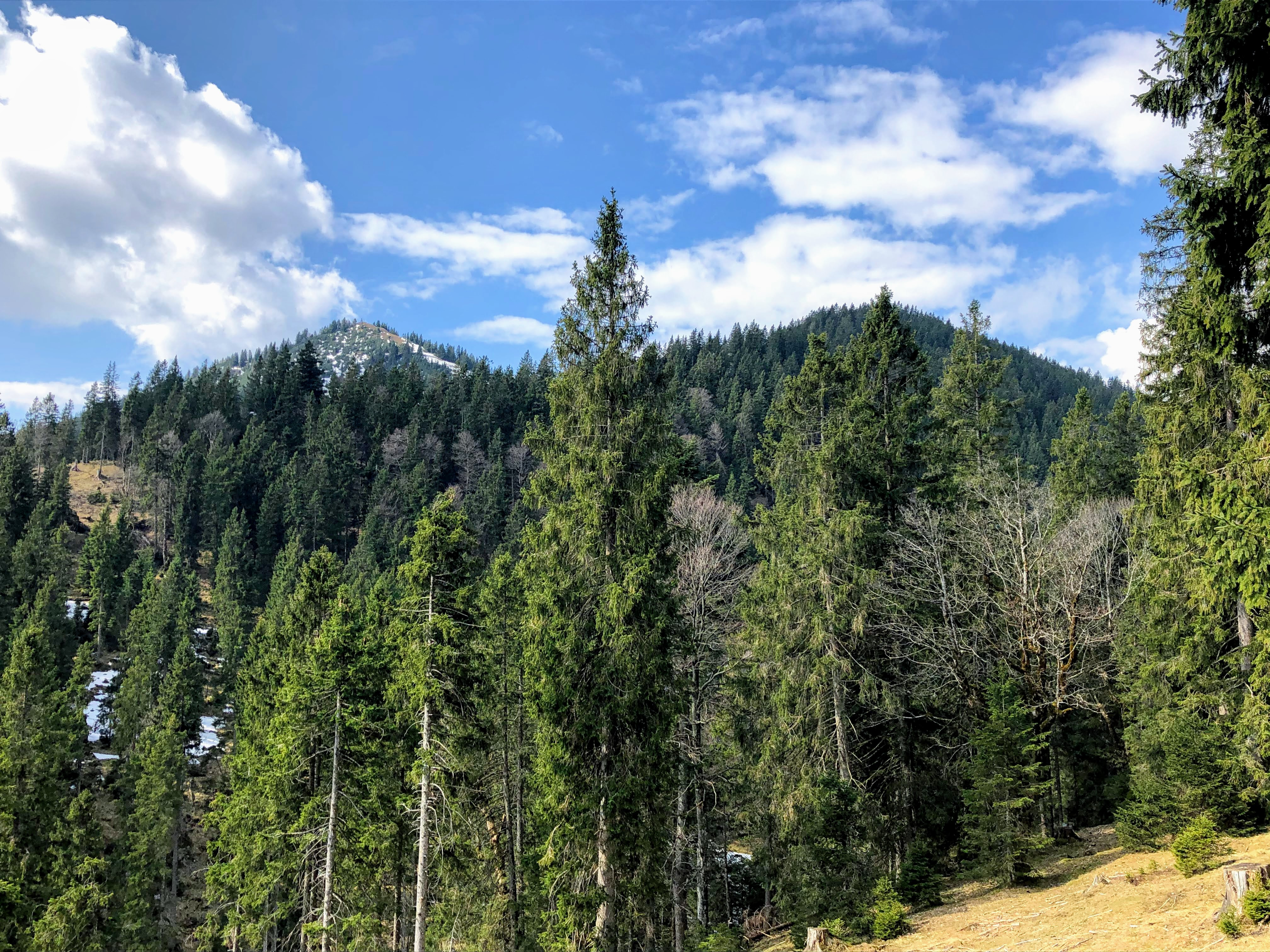
A mountainside covered in trees

Ölrain is a mountain of Bavaria, Germany.
