= Vindelici =

Gallic people

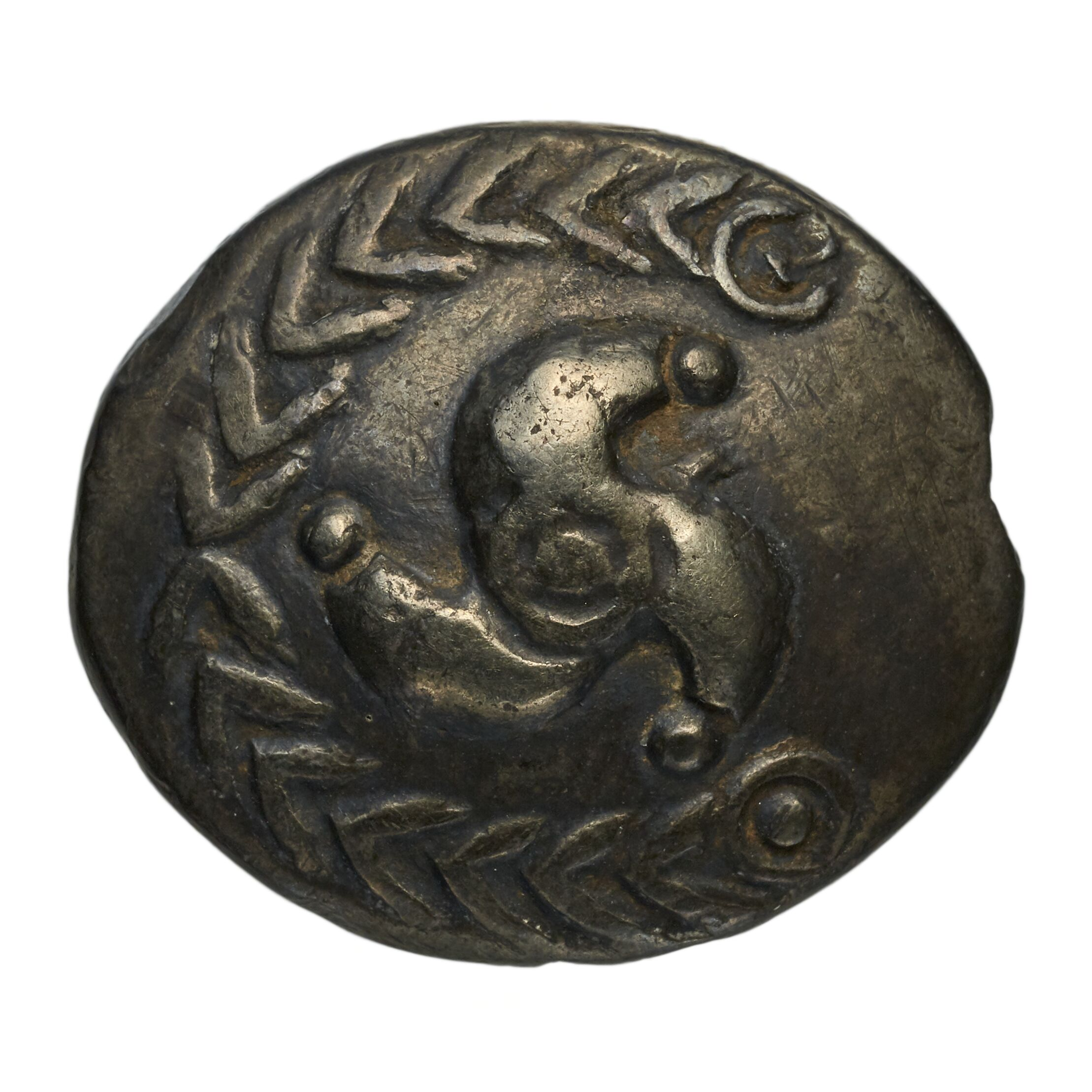
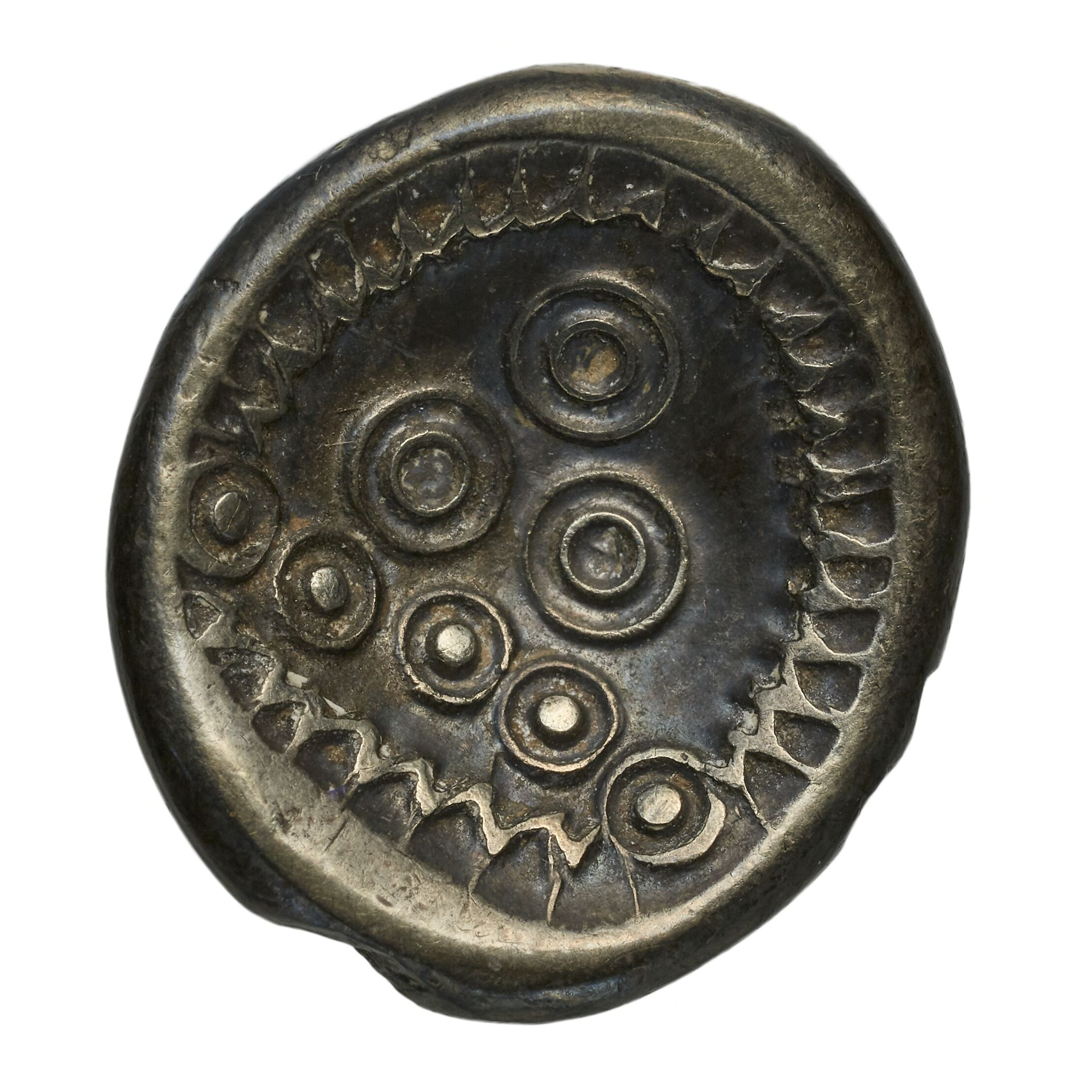
Gold alloy (electrum) stater of the Vindelici

The Vindelici (Gaulish: *Uindelicoi) were a Gallic people dwelling around present-day Augsburg (Bavaria) during the Iron Age and the Roman period. The Oppidum of Manching is thought to be the capital city of the Vindelici.

== Name ==
They are mentioned as Vindĕlĭcī by Horace (1st c. BC), as Ouindolikoì (Οὐινδολικοὶ; var. Οὐι(ν)δολίγοι) by Strabo (early 1st c. AD), as Vindelici (var. uendili-, uidelicino-, uideliquo-) by Pliny (1st c. AD), as Vindelici by Tacitus (early 2nd c. AD), and as Vindelici and Vindolici on inscriptions.

The ethnonym Vindelicī a latinized form of Gaulish *Uindelicoi (sing. *Uindelicos). It derives from the stem *uindo- ('clear, white, bright'), probably after the name of an unattested river *Uindelis or *Uindelos. A hydronym Vindelicus is mentioned by Florus as an alternative name of the Soulgas (Sorgue), in southeastern France. Alternatively, Patrizia de Bernardo Stempel has proposed to translate the name as 'those from the white rocks', by deriving the second element from Gaulish lica ('flat stone').

== Geography ==
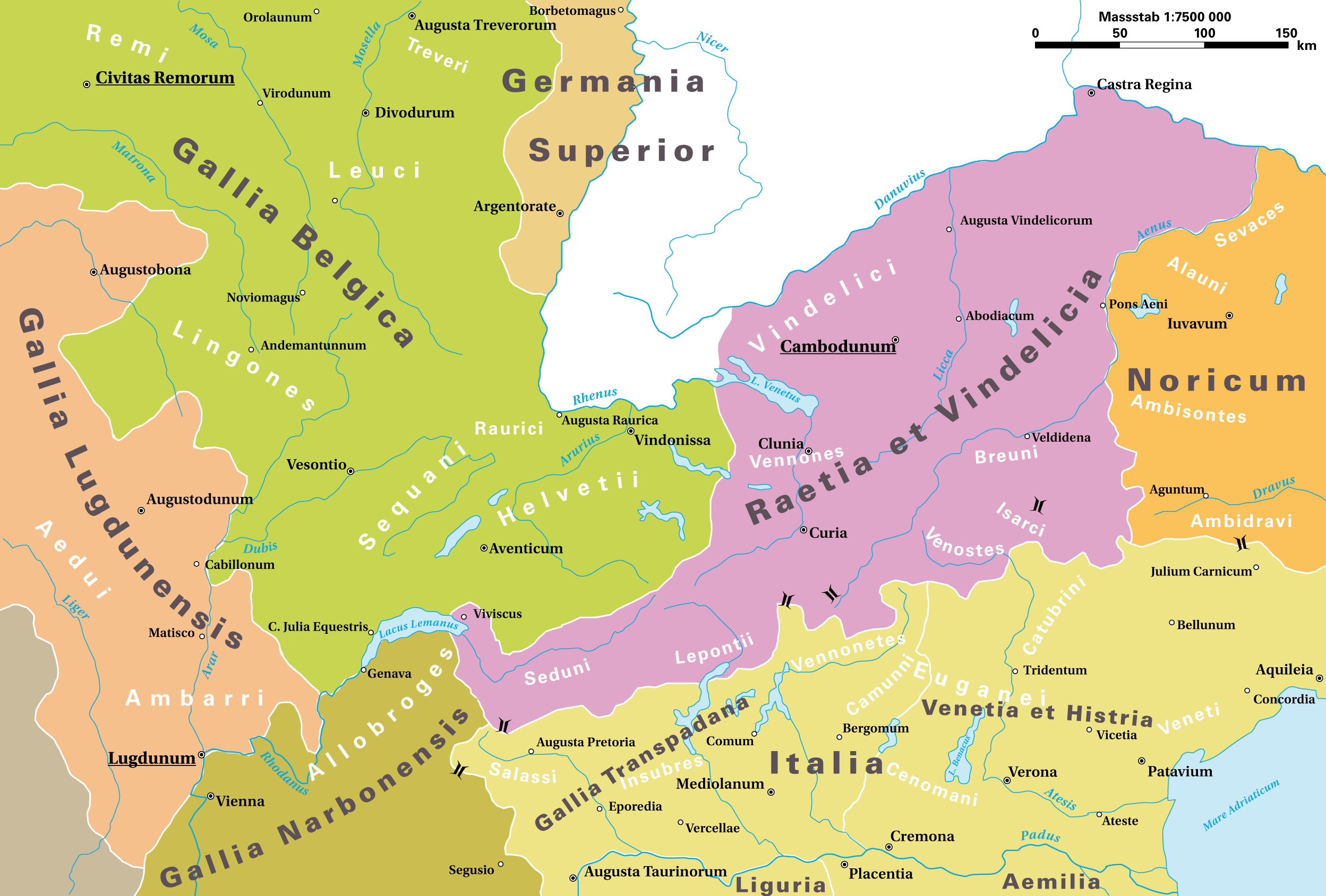
Alpine tribes and Roman provinces in the Alps around 14 BC.

The Vindelici lived on the Upper Bavarian-Upper Swabian plateau, probably also in Vorarlberg and Tyrol, in a land stretching from the southern slopes of the Alps up to the Danube river. They later occupied the eastern part of the province of Raetia, in a region known by Ptolemy as Vindelicia. The Barrington Atlas locates their territory west of the Catenates, south of the Raetovarii, north of the Licates and east of Noricum.

Their chief town during the Roman period was known as Augusta Vindelicum or Aelia Augusta (modern Augsburg). A first Roman military camp was occupied from 10 BC up until c. 15 AD, when it was probably destroyed by flooding and relocated to the south. The second fort, abandoned in the 70–80s, was rapidly covered by the expanding civilian settlement. Augusta Vindelicum served at a time as the capital of Raetia and the residence of the provincial governor. It obtained the status of municipium under the emperor Hadrian (117–138 AD). From the reign of Diocletian (284–305), the city became the capital of Raetia secunda.

== Political organization ==
In the narrow sense, the Vindelician people comprised four sub-tribes, listed on the Tropaeum Alpium: the Cosuanetes, Rucinates, Licates and Catenates.

In a broader sense, they included, as counted by Strabo, the Licates, Clautenatii, Vennones, Estiones, and Brigantii, although this classification has been criticized as doubtful by some scholars. Rather than sub-tribes, they may have rather been pagi or clients of the Vindelici.

Despite the proximity of Augusta Vindelicum, the Vindelici were only partially Romanized.

== History ==
They are mentioned by Pliny the Elder as one of the Alpine tribes conquered by Rome in 16–15 BC, and whose name was engraved on the Tropaeum Alpium.

Later on, the Vindelici served as auxiliary soldiers in the Roman army, in the cohortes Raetorum et Vindelicorum.

== See also ==
- Oppidum of Manching
- Pfostenschlitzmauer
- Viereckschanze
