= Anauni =

Ancient Alpine tribe

The Anauni were a Celtic–Rhaetic tribe living in the Non Valley (Trentino region, Italy), during the Iron Age and the Roman period.

== Name ==
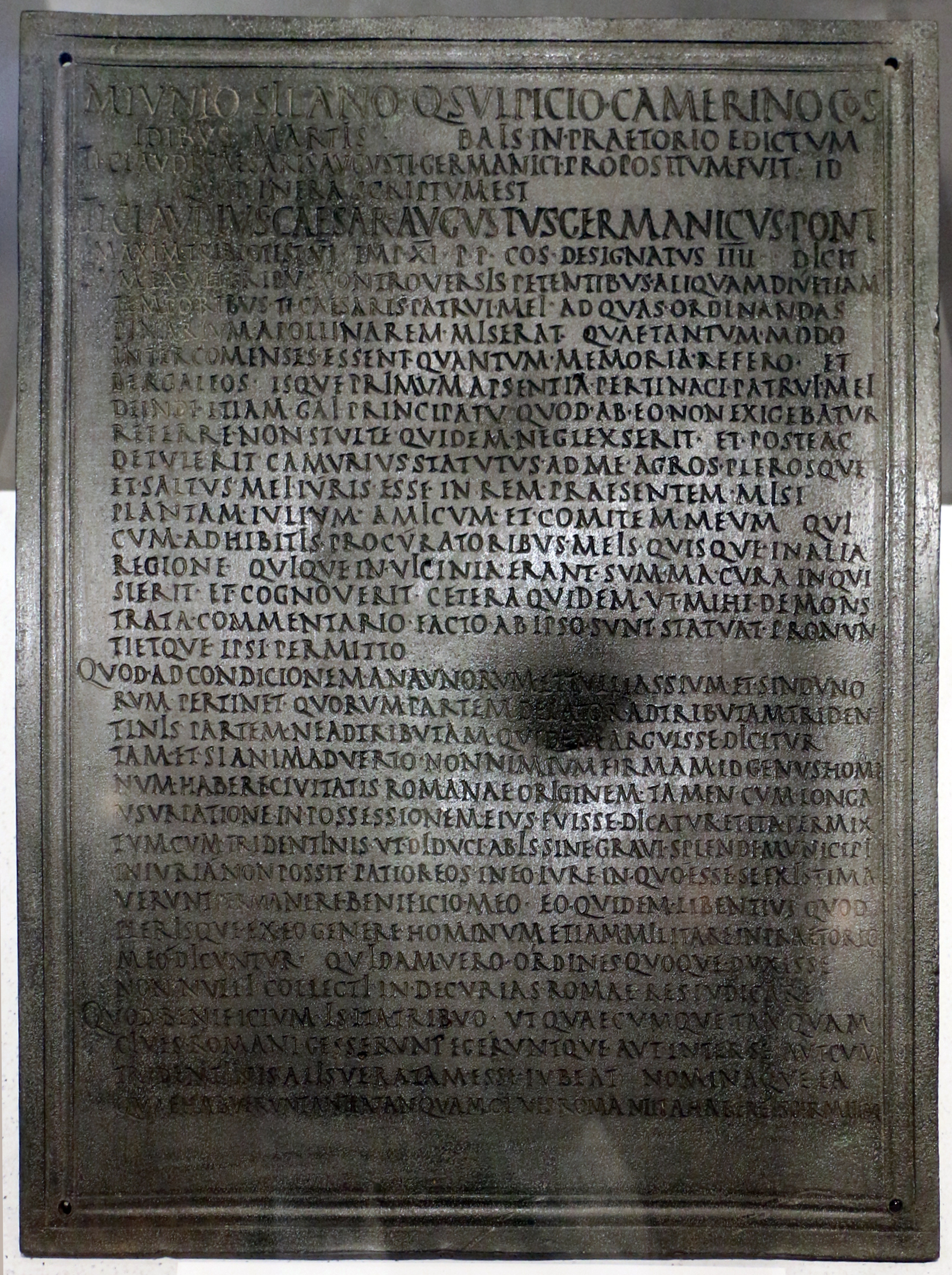
Tabula clesiana, containing the edict de Anaunorum civitate of Emperor Claudius

They are mentioned as Anaunorum on the edict of Claudius (46 AD), and as Anauniae by Paulinus (5th c. AD).

The ethnonym Anauni is a Latinized form of the Gaulish *anaunoi (from an earlier *ana-mn-oi), derived from the Celtic stem *ana- ('to remain'; cf. Old Irish anaid 'waits, remains'). It has been interpreted as meaning 'the Staying Ones' or the 'Sedentary', in contrast to the ethnonym Alauni, meaning 'the wanderers, errants, nomads'.

== Geography ==
The territory of the Anauni lay in the Alpine Non Valley, in what is now the Trentino region.

Their chief town, Anaunion (modern Nanno), is mentioned by Ptolemy (2nd c. AD), and later referred to as the "oppidum of the Anauni" by Paulus Diaconus (8th c. AD).

== History ==
The Anauni were of Rhaetian origin, although archaeological evidence from the settlement site of Sanzeno indicates strong La Tène (Celtic) influences, particularly in the 2nd century BC.

On 15 March 46 AD, Emperor Claudius issued an edict at Baiae granting Roman citizenship to the Anauni, Tulliasses, and Sinduni. Although these Alpine communities were attached to the nearby municipium of Tridentum, which already possessed Roman citizenship, they were treated as de facto citizens but their own status was legally unclear. Claudius's edict formally confirmed them as Roman citizens.
