= Vennones =

Ancient Alpine tribe

The Vennones or Vennonetes were a Gallic or Rhaetian tribe dwelling in the northern Alps, between Chur and Lake Constance, during the Iron Age and the Roman era.

== Name ==
They are mentioned as Ouénnōnes (Οὐέννωνες) by Strabo (early 1st c. AD), as Vennonenses (var. -onetes) by Pliny (1st c. AD), and as Ouénnōnetes (Οὐέννωνετες) by Ptolemy (2nd c. AD).

The etymology of the name remains obscure. If Celtic, and not Rhaetic, it can be derived from the root ueno- ('friend'), with a sound shift -n- > -nn- attested in other cases (e.g. Vena / Venna), or else from to uenno- (< *uegno-), meaning 'chariot'.

== Geography ==
The location of their territory is uncertain. Ernst Meyer placed them in the Valtellina. Denis van Berchem and Colin M. Wells, by contrast, placed them in the lower Alpine Rhine, between Chur and Lake Constance. The Barrington Atlas locates their territory north of the Calucones, west of the Estiones, Focunates and Genaunes, south of the Brigantii.

Pliny described the Vennones and Sarunetes as "Rhaetian tribes living near the sources of the river Rhine".

== History ==
They were subjugated by the Roman forces of Publius Silius Nerva in 16 BC.

The Vennonetes appear as the third tribe in the inscription on the Tropaeum Alpium. In the secondary tradition of the text by Pliny the Elder their position in the list was exchanged with the Venostes and the Vennonetes appear as the fourth tribe.
