= Focunates =

Ancient Alpine tribe

The Focunates were an ancient Alpine tribe dwelling near present-day Innsbruck (Tyrol) during the Iron Age.

== Name ==
They are mentioned as Focunates by Pliny (1st c. AD).

== Geography ==
The Focunates lived west of Veldidena (modern Wilten, Innsbruck), in Raetia. Their territory was located south of the Genauni, north of the Venostes, west of the Breuni, east of the Vennones and Calucones.

== History ==
They are mentioned by Pliny the Elder as one of the Alpine tribes conquered by Rome in 16–15 BC, and whose name was engraved on the Tropaeum Alpium.
