= Cosuanetes =

Ancient tribe

The Cosuanetes were an ancient tribe living in the Alps during the Iron Age and the Roman era.

== Name ==
They are mentioned as Cosuanetes (var. -naetes, -nates) by Pliny (1st c. AD), as Kōtonántioi (Κωτονάντιοι) by Strabo (early 1st c. AD), and as Kōnsonántai (Κωνσονάνται) by Ptolemy (2nd c. AD).

According to Xavier Delamarre, the name could be interpreted as the Celtic Co-su-anates, from anatia ('soul'), or Co-su-uan-ates, from -uanos ('killer of'). However, Alexander Falileyev argues that "the discrepancies in spelling and Strabo's association of the tribe with the Raeti makes Celtic interpretation, though possible (ko(m)-su-an-et-es or the like) not necessary". The ethnic name Suanetes appears to be linguistically related.

== Geography ==
The tribe was probably located in modern western Austria, near the Rucinates, although no precise location is certain. They were part of the Vindelici.

== History ==
They are mentioned by Pliny the Elder as one of the Alpine tribes conquered by Rome in 16–15 BC, and whose name was engraved on the Tropaeum Alpium.
