= Suanetes =

Ancient tribe

The Suanetes were a Gallic or Raetian tribe living in the Alps, near modern Chur (eastern Switzerland), during the Iron Age and the Roman era.

== Name ==
They are mentioned as Suanetes (var. suanene-, suannene-) by Pliny (1st c. AD), and as Souánetes (Σουάνετες) by Ptolemy (2nd c. AD).

According to Xavier Delamarre, the name could be interpreted as the Celtic Su-anates, from anatia ('soul'). The ethnic name Cosuanetes appears to be linguistically related.

== Geography ==
The tribe was located in the valley of the Hinterrhein and in the Oberhalbstein region, near modern Chur (eastern Switzerland). Pliny mentions them conjointly with the Cosuanetes and the Rugusci.

== History ==
They are mentioned by Pliny the Elder as one of the Alpine tribes conquered by Rome in 16–15 BC, and whose name was engraved on the Tropaeum Alpium. Weapons discovered at Tiefencastel and on the Septimer Pass provide further evidence to this account.
