= Venostes =

Ancient alpine tribe

The Venostes were a Celtic or Rhaetian tribe dwelling in the present-day Vinschgau Valley (Val Venosta) during the Iron Age.

== Name ==
They are mentioned as Venostes by Pliny (1st c. AD).

== Geography ==
The Venostes dwelled in the Vinschgau valley. Their territory extended eastwards as far as Mount Töll. The Barrington Atlas locates their territory south of the Focunates, west of the Isarci and Brixentes, (Note: The location of the Brixentes has been debated. Ernst Meyer placed them instead in the area around Bregenz.) north of the Tuliassi, and east of the Rugusci.

== History ==
They are mentioned by Pliny the Elder as one of the Alpine tribes conquered by Rome in 16–15 BC, and whose name was engraved on the Tropaeum Alpium. According to Gerhard H. Waldherr, since tribes are listed in the order of their subjugation to Rome, the Venostes and the Camunni may have been subjugated in 16 BC by the Roman pro-consul P. Silius.

The Venostes appear as the fourth tribe in the inscription on the Tropaeum Alpium. In the secondary tradition of the text by Pliny the Elder their position in the list was exchanged with the Vennonetes and the Venostes appear as the third tribe.

== Culture ==
Their ethnic identity remains unclear. They have been variously described as a Celtic or as a Rhaetian tribe.
