= Estiones =

Ancient tribe

The Estiones were an ancient tribe living in the modern Bavaria region during the Roman period.

== Name ==
They are mentioned as Estiōnēs (Ἐστίωνες) by Strabo (early 1st c. AD).

Several scholars have proposed emending Strabo's attestation to Eskones, deriving from a stem *eskon- that is attested in the toponym Scongowa (modern Schongau). The same stem also appears in several other names from the region. The statio Esc(onensis) is believed to have been located near Ischl an der Alz in the Chiemgau region. The Tabula Peutingeriana likewise records a locality Escone, between Kempten and Epfach, whose name reflects a nominative Esco. It is also thought to underlie the ethnonym Scutt(arenses) on a votive inscription from Nassenfels (district of Eichstätt), near the river Schutter, which is itself attested as Scutara.

== Geography ==
Stabo writes that the Estiones, just like the Brigantii, belonged to the Vindelici, with Cambodunum (modern Kempten) as their chief town. However, no archaeological evidence for a preceding Celtic settlement at Cambodunum has been identified so far.

== History ==
According to K. Dietz, the absence of the Estiones from the Tropaeum Alpium may indicate that they voluntarily joined the Roman Empire, which "could offer an explanation for the rapid rise of Kempten in the 1st century".

== Bibliography ==
- Karlheinz, Dietz (2008). "Toponyme auf römischen Inschriften aus Bayern". Blätter für oberdeutsche Namenforschung. 45: 10–22. ISSN 0172-0872.
- Sommer, C. Sebastian (2008). "Die Anfänge der Provinz Raetie". Die römischen Provinzen: Begriff und Gründung. Vol. 45. Editura Mega. pp. 207–224.
- Weber, Gerhard (2000). "Cambodunum in der frühen Geschichte Raetiens". In Weber, Gerhard; Faber, Andrea (eds.). Cambodunum - Kempten: erste Hauptstadt der Provinz Raetien?. Sonderbände der Antiken Welt. Mainz am Rhein: von Zabern. pp. 18–24. ISBN 978-3-8053-2691-9.
