= Rucinates =

Gallic tribe

The Rucinates (Gaulish: *Rucinatis) or Rucantii (Gaulish: *Rucantioi) were a Gallic tribe dwelling near the confluence of the Isar and Danube rivers during the Roman period.

== Name ==
They are mentioned as R̔oukántioi (Ῥουκάντιοι) by Strabo (early 1st c. AD), as Rucinates (var. irucina-) by Pliny (1st c. AD), as R̔ounikátai (Ῥουνικάται) by Ptolemy (2nd c. AD), and as Rucinates on an inscription.

The meaning of the name remains uncertain. It has been translated as 'the blushing (i.e. shameful or shaming) people', by connecting the first element to the Gaulish *rucco- ('shame, blush of shame'). Alternatively, Patrizia de Bernardo Stempel has proposed to derive the name from a form *roukkina (cf. Welsh rhuchen 'jerkin, jacket, coat'), itself from *roukka (cf. Welsh rhuch 'garment, cloak, mantle'). In this view, the variant R̔oukántioi handed down by Strabo could be explained as 'those who wear a roukka'. The form given by Ptolemy (Runicates) is a metathesis of the original form (Rucinates).

== Geography ==
The Rucinates lived near the confluence of the Isar and Danube rivers. The Barrington Atlas locates their territory north of the Catenates, east of the Raetovarii, south of the Iuthungi. They were part of the Vindelici.

== History ==
They are mentioned by Pliny the Elder as one of the Alpine tribes conquered by Rome in 16–15 BC, and whose name was engraved on the Tropaeum Alpium.
