= List of mayors of Middelburg, Zeeland =

Coat of arms of Middelburg

This is a list of mayors of the city of Middelburg, Zeeland, capital of the province of Zeeland, The Netherlands. On 4 January 1824 it was decided by Royal Order that only one mayor at a time would govern the city. Mayors of Dutch municipalities are officially appointed by the Crown, although usually the municipal council and the King's Commissioner of the province make the decision.

== List ==
| Portrait | Name | Term in office | Party / Political affiliation | Notes |
|---|---|---|---|---|
| Jacob Hendrik Schorer (1760-1822) | Jacob Hendrik Schorer (1760–1822) | 20 January 1808 - 22 October 1810 (2 years, 275 days) | | Schorer had been the de facto mayor since 1803, then known as "President of the city council". Which had been a yearly chosen position since 1802. Since May 1810 known as Maire.^{[Resigned]} |
| Cornelis Gerrit Bijleveld | Cornelis Gerrit Bijleveld (1765–1849) | 22 October 1810 - 15 March 1835 (24 years, 144 days) | Federalist during the French period, later Pro-government and ultra-conservative | Until 11 May 1814 known as Maire. From 28 December 1815 to 13 February 1824 joined by two other mayors. |
| | *Leonard Cornelis van Sonsbeeck (1781–1831) | 28 December 1815: 13 February 1824; (8 years, 47 days) | | *Never solely mayor. Since, at least 26 April 1814, Adjunct-Maire and Vice-Burgemeester (Deputy-Mayor). |
| | *David Isaäc Schorer (1764–1828) | 28 December 1815: 13 February 1824; (8 years, 47 days) | | *Never solely mayor. Younger brother of J.H. Schorer. |
| | Johan Frederik Lantsheer (1791-1838) | 1835/1836 - 30 August 1838 | | ^{[Acting]} From 15 March 1835 to appointment.^{[Died in Office]} |
| Marinus Cornelis Paspoort van Grijpskerke | Marinus Cornelis Paspoort van Grijpskerke (1797–1874) | 12 / 16 November 1838 – 15 March 1859 | 'Pragmatic' liberal | Son-in-law of J.H. Schorer |
| Jean François Bijleveld | Jean François Bijleveld van Serooskerke (1794–1875) | 13 April 1859 – 1 January 1871 (11 years, 263 days) | Conservative | Son of C.G. Bijleveld^{[Acting]} from 14 March to appointment |
| Johan Willem Meinard Schorer | Johan Willem Meinard Schorer (1834–1903) | 1 March 1871 – 15 November 1879 (8 years, 259 days) | Conservative-liberal | Grandson of D.I. Schorer |
| Carolus Joannes Pické | Carolus Joannes Pické (1831–1887) | 1 January 1880 – 1 April 1887 (7 years, 90 days) | Liberal | Brother-in-law of J.W.M. Schorer^{[Died in Office]} |
| | Leonhard Schorer (1848–1907) | 5 April 1887 – 8 November 1907 (20 years, 217 days) | Liberal | Grandson of J.H. Schorer^{[Died in Office]} |
| | Martinus van den Brandeler (1859–1924) | 1 February 1908 – 1 February 1915 (7 years, 0 days) | Moderate Liberal | |
| | Pieter Dumon Tak (1867–1943) | 1 February 1915 – 1 January 1933 (17 years, 335 days) | Associated with the Free-thinking; Democratic League | |
| Meine Fernhout | Meine Fernhout (1884–1977) | 4 April 1933 – 15 March 1939 (5 years, 345 days) | Anti-Revolutionary | |
| Jan van Walré de Bordes | Jan van Walré de Bordes (1894–1947) | 1 June 1939 – 15 October 1942 (3 years, 136 days) | Linked to Christian Historical | ^{[Resigned]} |
| Adriaan Meerkamp van Embden | Adriaan Meerkamp van Embden (1882–1954) | 15 October 1942 – 16 October 1944* (2 years, 1 day) | National Socialist | ^{[Acting]} *Fled the city. |
| | Adriaan Jacobus van der Weel (1897–1980) | 7 November 1944 – 1 Augustus 1946 (1 year, 267 days) | | ^{[Acting]} |
| | Willem Cornelis Sandberg (1908–1949) | 1 November 1946 – 6 September 1949 (2 years, 309 days) | | ^{[Died in Office]} |
| Nico Bolkestein | Nico Bolkestein (1910–1993) | 1 July 1950 – 16 July 1957 (7 years, 15 days) | Labour Party | |
| Johan de Widt | Johan de Widt (1908-1971) | 19 February 1958 – 1 April 1961 (3 years, 41 days) | Sympathized with the People's Party for Freedom and Democracy, but not a member. | |
| Job Drijber | Job Drijber (1924-2016) | 3 November 1961 – 16 November 1969 (8 years, 13 days) | People's Party for Freedom and Democracy | |
| Piet Wolters | Piet Wolters (1920-2010) | 16 February 1970 – 29 Augustus 1985 (15 years, 194 days) | People's Party for Freedom and Democracy | |
| Chris Rutten | Chris Rutten (born 1942) | 21 September 1985 – 16 January 1996 (10 years, 117 days) | People's Party for Freedom and Democracy | |
| Don Burgers | Don Burgers (1932-2006) | 16 January 1996 – 1 June 1997 (1 year, 136 days) | Christian; Democratic Appeal | ^{[Acting]} |
| Bert Spahr van der Hoek | Bert Spahr van der Hoek (born 1946) | 1 June 1997 – 1 June 2001 (4 years, 0 days) | People's Party for Freedom and Democracy | ^{[Honorably discharged]} |
| Don Burgers | Don Burgers (1932-2006) | 1 juni 2001 – 16 January 2002 (229 days) | Christian; Democratic Appeal | ^{[Acting]} |
| | Koos Schouwenaar (born 1947) | 16 January 2002 – 1 May 2012 (10 years, 106 days) | People's Party for Freedom and Democracy | |
| | Erik van Heijningen (born 1961) | 1 May 2012 – 27 Augustus 2012 (118 days) | People's Party for Freedom and Democracy | ^{[Acting]} |
| Harald Bergmann | Harald Bergmann (born 1965) | 27 Augustus 2012 – 13 March 2024 (11 years, 199 days) | People's Party for Freedom and Democracy | |
| | Marcel Fränzel (born 1960) | 13 March 2024 – Incumbent (1 year, 217 days) | D66 | ^{[Acting]} |

^{Acting}
^{Resigned}
^{Died in Office}
^{Honorably discharged}

== See also ==
- Middelburg, Zeeland
