= Notre Dame des Anges =

Coordinates: 51.8368°N 5.9073°E

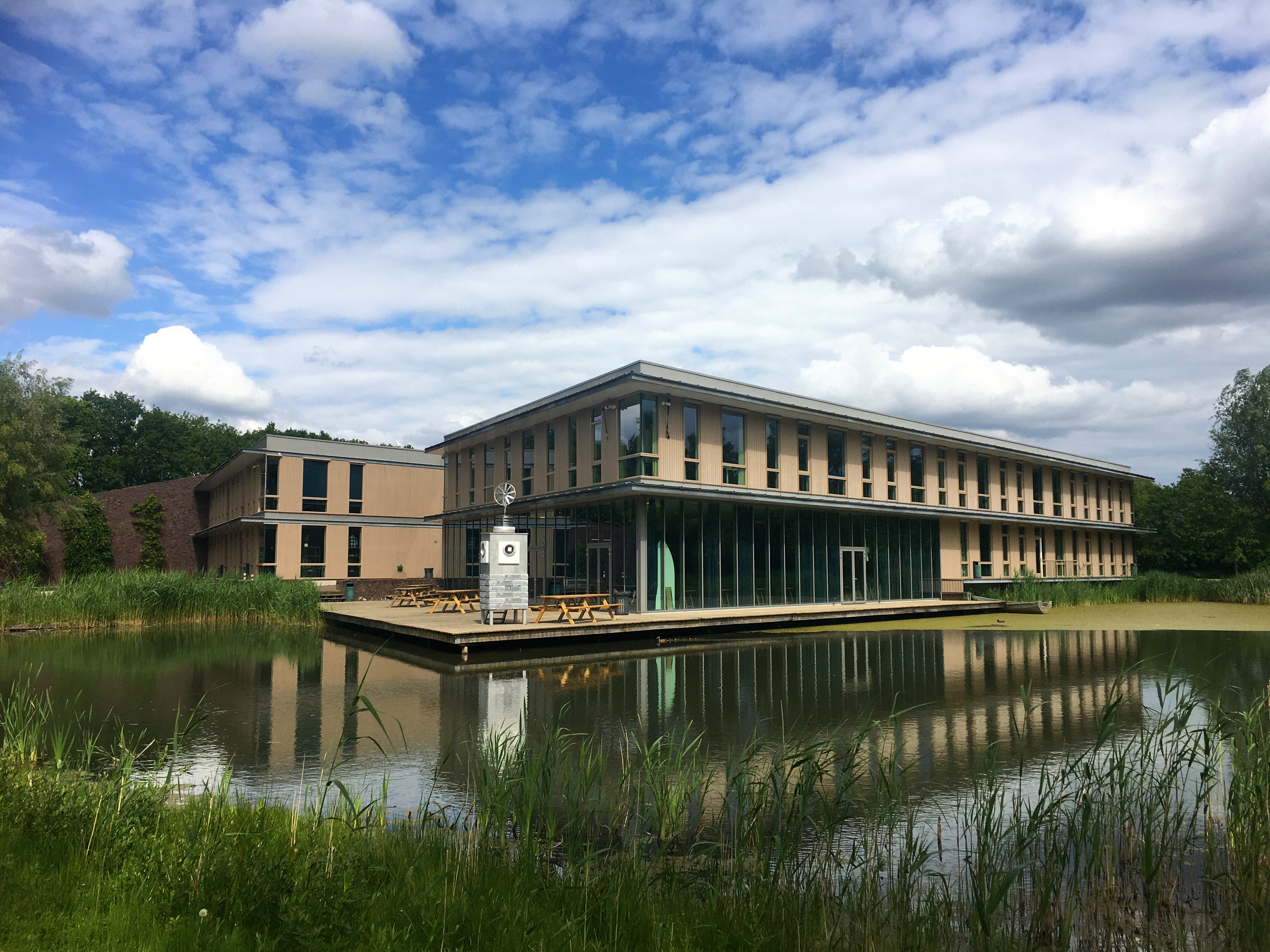
- The current school building

Location
- Kasteelselaan 50; Ubbergen, Gelderland; Netherlands

Information
- Type: Havo
- Denomination: Catholic
- Established: 1903; 123 years ago
- Headmaster: Petra Molenaar
- Teaching staff: 50
- Gender: Coeducation
- Enrollment: 600
- Colors: Green; Chartreuse; Blue
- Slogan: Choose your own path!
- Nickname: Notre Dame
- Website: Notredame.nl
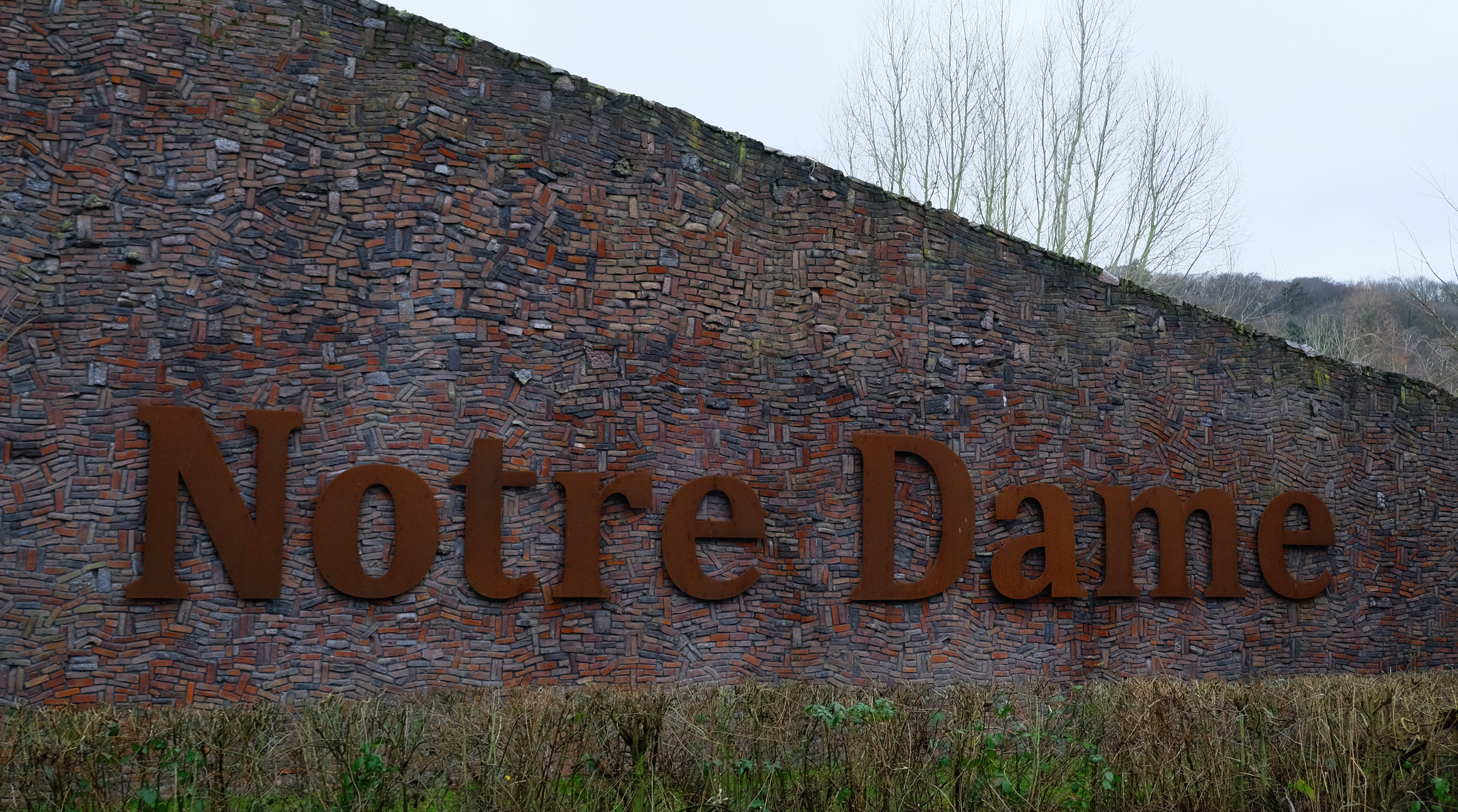
- Noise barrier made of rejected bricks from the region (north side of the current building)

Notre Dame des Anges, usually called the Notre Dame, is a secondary education school in the Netherlands. The school is located in Ubbergen (near the city of Nijmegen), in the province of Gelderland. It is the only secondary school in the Netherlands that only offers higher general continued education (Dutch: havo). Notre Dame des Anges is named after the Chapel of Notre Dame des Anges near Lurs, in the French Alps; this chapel was supposed to be miraculous.

== History ==
Notre Dame des Anges was founded in 1903 by French nuns. At the time it was a boarding school for Catholic girls. The nuns lived in 'Ter Meer': a villa located near Ubbergen, in the woodlands on the flank of the push moraine between Nijmegen and Kleve (part of the Lower Rhine Heights). Between 1910 and 1926, the institution was expanded with large classrooms, a gym, a dormitory, a chapel and a carriage house where the support staff lived.

Until 1968, Notre Dame des Anges functioned as an all-girls secondary school. The institution continued as a secondary education school for only higher general continued education (Dutch: havo). In 1973, a new building for Notre Dame des Anges was built at the foot of the push moraine. The old building complex of the institution was sold to a textile manufacturer. He named it 'De Refter'.

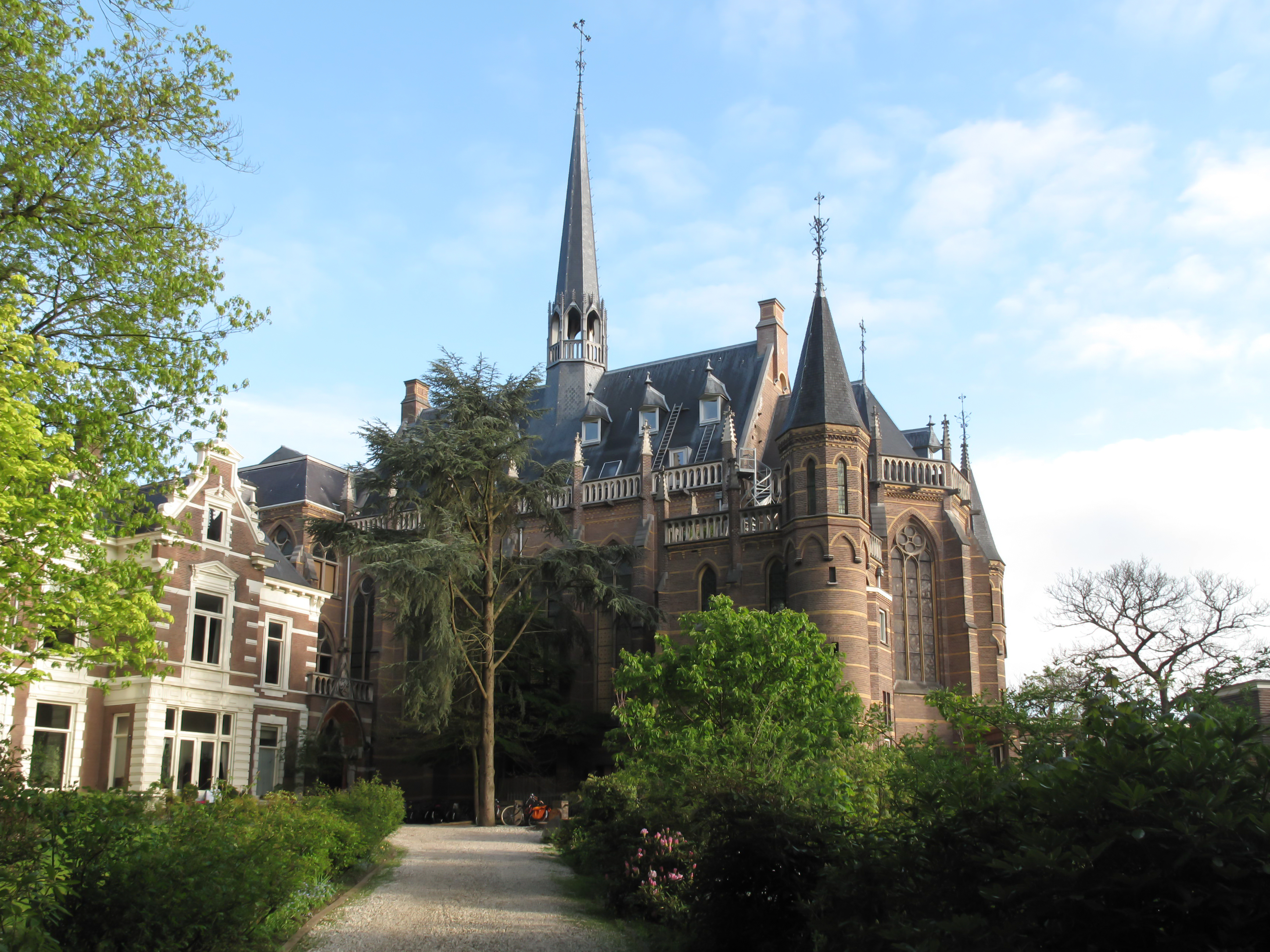
The original location of Notre Dame des Anges, on the flank of the push moraine. The building complex has been renamed 'De Refter' since the early 1970s.

Around 2010 it was found that the second school building of Notre Dame des Anges was outdated. Therefore, it was demolished in 2011. During the same year, the school moved to a new school building, which was built right next to the school's outdated building.

== Awards ==
The list below lists the awards the school has received.

- KlASSe Award – 2009
- Spatial Quality Award of Gelderland (Dutch: Gelderse Prijs voor Ruimtelijke Kwaliteit) – 2014

== Notable graduates ==
The list below includes notable people who graduated at Notre Dame des Anges.

- Olly van Abbe (1935–2017), well-known sculptor in the Netherlands
- Floriske van Leeuwen (1971), former member of the Senate and former party chairwoman of the Party for the Animals
- Marthe Weijers (1989), well-known hip-hop dancer and choreographer in the Netherlands

== Notable former teachers ==
The list below lists notable people who have worked as a teacher at Notre Dame des Anges.

- Marga Klompé (1912–1986), former KVP politician and the first female minister of the Netherlands (worked as chemistry teacher)
- Bart Welten (1922–1970), famous sculptor in the Netherlands (worked as visual arts teacher)
- Lia Roefs (1955), former member of the House of Representatives on behalf of the Labour Party (worked as geography teacher)

== Gallery ==
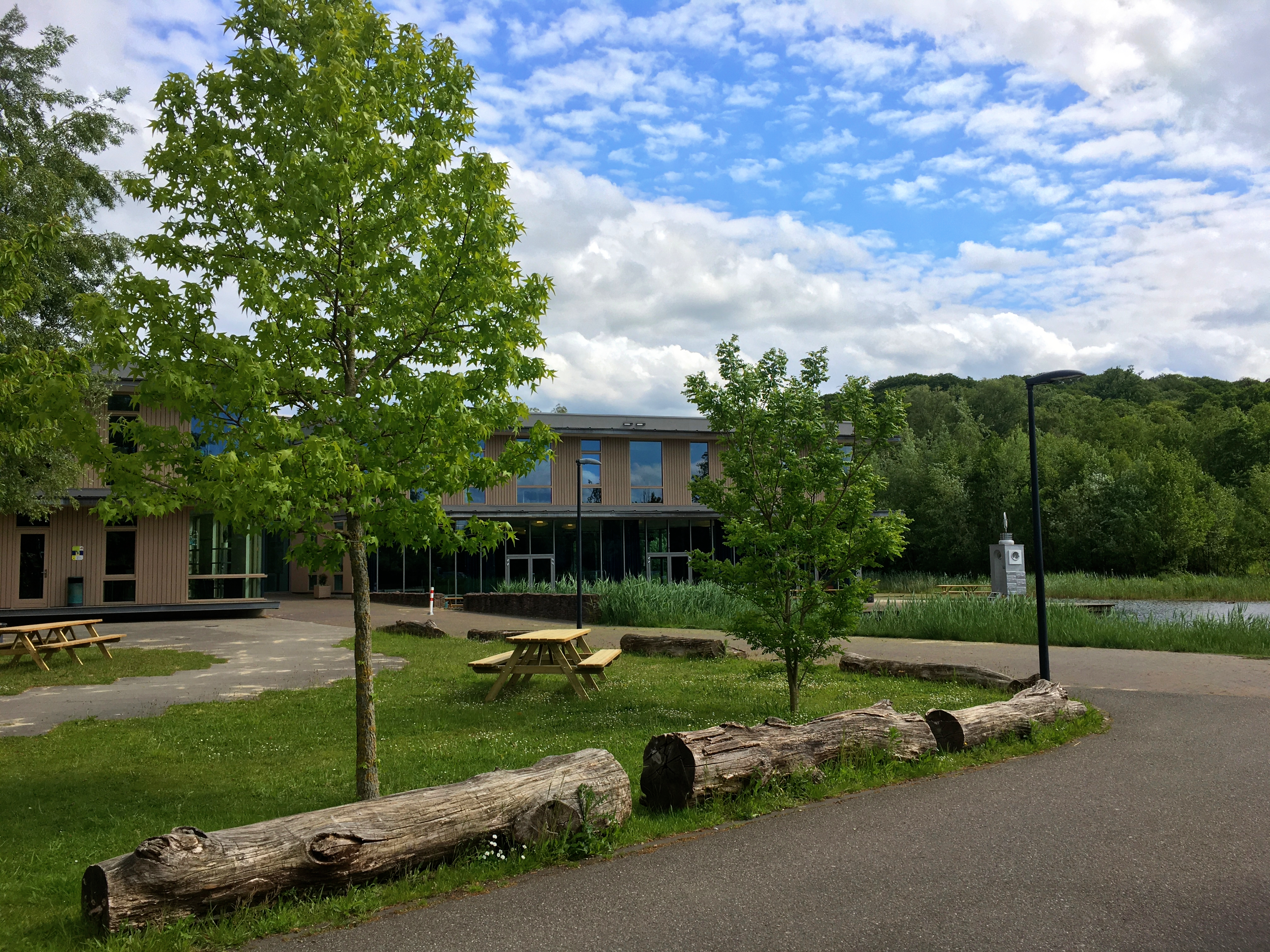
Entrance of the current school building

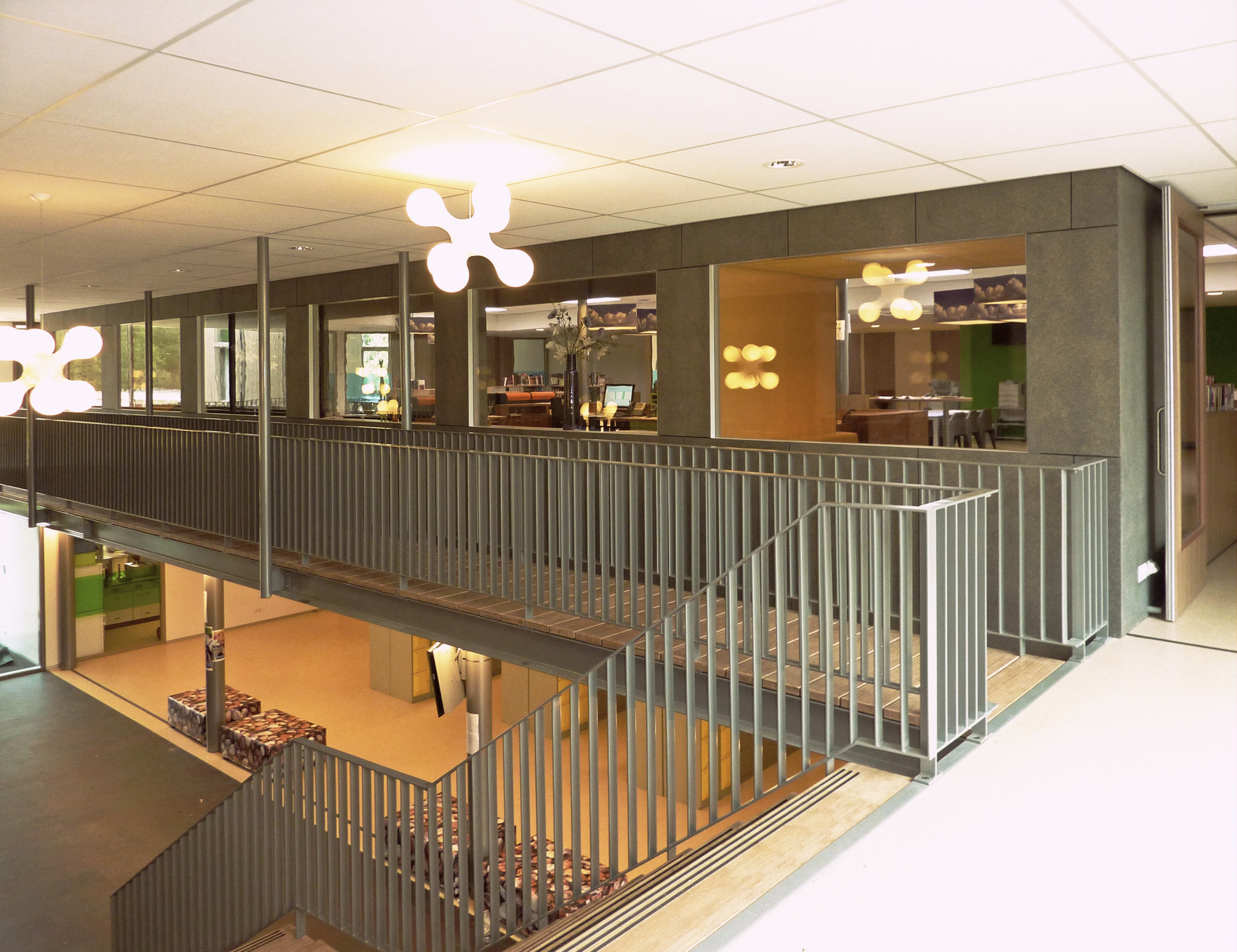
Interior design of the school building

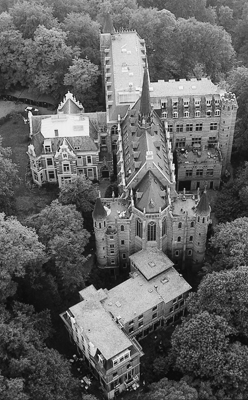
Aerial photo of the original location

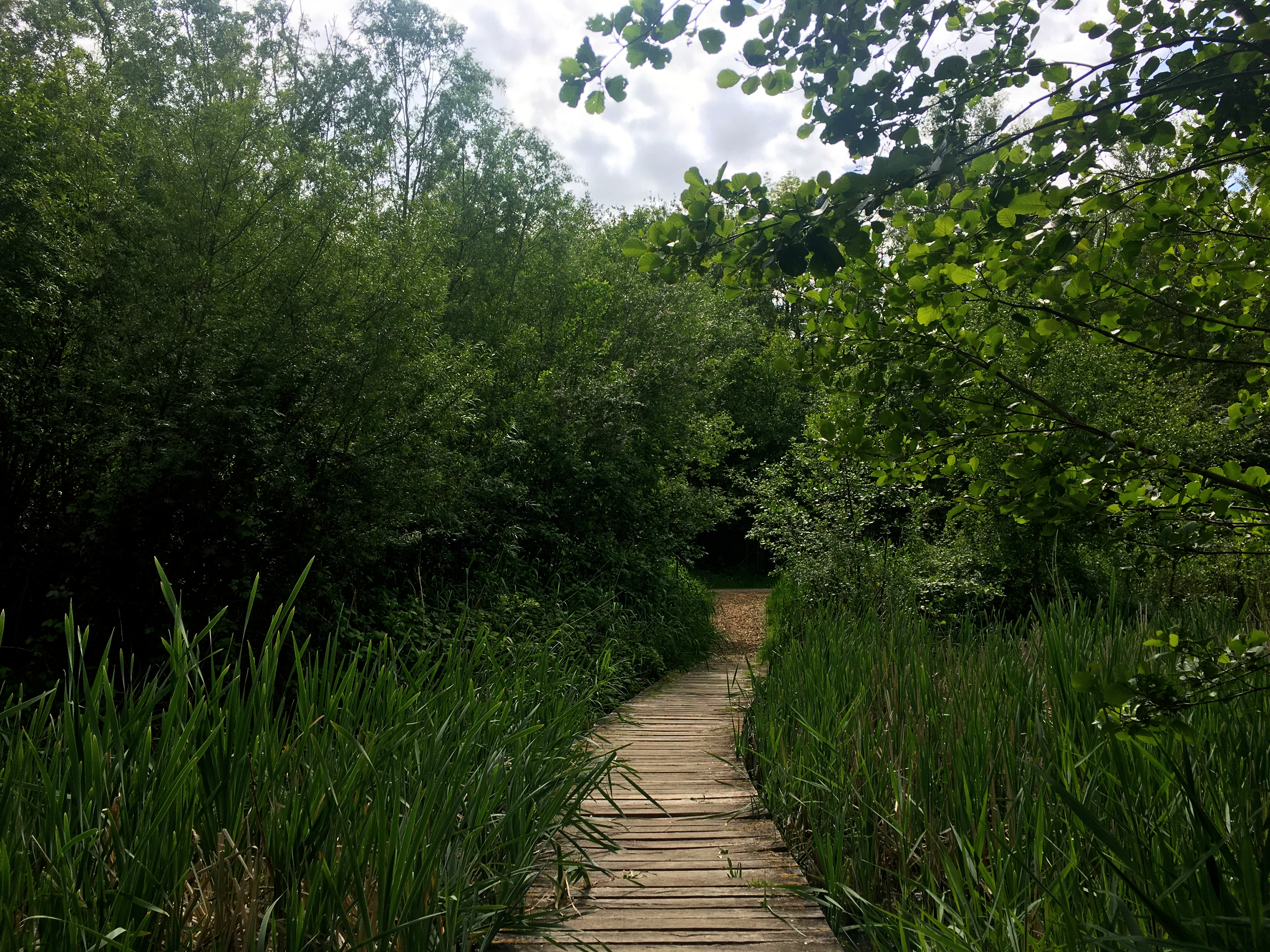
Carr around the school

== Trivia ==
- On 2 February 2010, American historian and human rights activist Timuel Black visited the school during his visit to the Netherlands.

== See also ==
- 1905 French law on the Separation of the Churches and the State
