= Jack Drummond =

British biochemist (1891–1952)

Sir Jack Drummond FRS
- Born: 12 January 1891; Newington, London, England, UK
- Died: 4 August or 5 August 1952 (aged 61) near Lurs, France
- Other name: Jack Cecil Spinks
- Education: Queen Mary, University of London; King's College London
- Known for: naming of vitamins; nutrition under wartime rationing
- Scientific career
- Fields: Biochemistry; Nutrition
- Workplaces: University College London
- Academic advisors: Otto Rosenheim

Notes
- There is much speculation over the identity of his murderer or murderers, and the motive behind the crime.

Sir Jack Cecil Drummond FRIC, FRS (12 January 1891 – 4/5 August 1952), known as a child as Jack Cecil Spinks, was a biochemist, noted for his work on nutrition as applied to the British diet under rationing during the Second World War. He was murdered, together with his wife and 10-year-old daughter, in what became known as the Dominici affair, on the night of 4–5 August 1952 near Lurs, a village or commune in the Basses-Alpes department (now Alpes-de-Haute-Provence) of Southern France.

== Early life and family background ==
Jack Drummond was born either in Leicester, or London, likely Newington or Kennington. He was the son of Colonel John Drummond of the Royal Horse Artillery and Nora Gertrude McQuie, who had resided at 65 Howard Road, Clarendon Park, Leicester. John Drummond died at age 55, only three months after Jack's birth. Jack was adopted and raised by a paternal aunt, Maria Spinks, who lived in nearby Charlton. Maria's husband, George, was a retired captain quartermaster, who had seen action in the Crimea. According to author/biographer James Fergusson, life could not have been much fun for the solitary boy in the elderly couple's home. He attended The John Roan School (Note: This would have been the school's 1877 premises, and not the present building on Maze Hill, which was built in 1926. See Public Monument and Sculpture Association National Recording Project (John Roan School)) in Greenwich and King's College School. (Note: DNB has Drummond as attending King's College School in The Strand, but there must be some doubt about this, since the school moved to Wimbledon in 1897, when Jack was only 6. Also if Jack Drummond did attend KCS, it is likely that he must have had a scholarship to do so, as his family would not have been able to afford the fees.)

Drummond's family origins remain unclear. No birth certificate exists for him in the Family Records Office. His father John, the major, describes himself as a bachelor in his will, which makes no mention of a son. In the 1891 census, Jack's name was given as "Cecil", his mother's as "Gertrude Drummond", and her age as 29. It is not known what happened to Gertrude (presumably Nora Gertrude McQuie) or whether she was ever married to John. In the 1901 census, his name is recorded as Jack Cecil Spinks, taking his adoptive mother's surname. It is likely that as a boy Jack used the surname Spinks to avoid social embarrassment to his adoptive parents, but reverted to the surname Drummond sometime during his teens.

On 17 July 1915, Drummond married Mable Helen Straw, who had also been an undergraduate at East London College. Their marriage lasted 24 years until in 1939 it broke up because of Drummond's affair with his secretary and co-author, Anne Wilbraham (born 10 December 1907). Jack and Anne married on 15 June 1940. Their only child, Elizabeth, was born on 23 March 1942.

== Scientific career ==
After graduating with First Class honours in chemistry in 1912 at East London College (now Queen Mary University of London), Jack Drummond became a research assistant in the department of physiology at King's College London, working under Otto Rosenheim and the professor W.D. Halliburton. In 1914 he moved to the Cancer Hospital Research Institute where he worked with Casimir Funk who had coined the word vitamine (from vital amine). This was when Drummond first became interested in nutrition.

In 1917, Halliburton invited Drummond to join him in experimental work on substitutes for butter and margarine. As a result of this work, fat-soluble vitamins became one of his major fields of interest. It also led him to the study of practical problems of human nutrition and, in 1918, he published a paper in The Lancet on infant feeding.

In 1919, he moved to University College London (UCL) to work on physiological chemistry, the precursor to modern biochemistry. In 1920, he proposed that the "vital substances" discovered by Elmer Verner McCollum and by Casimir Funk should be called Vitamins A and B respectively, to contrast them with his proposed anti-scurvy factor, Vitamin C. He also dropped the final "e" from Funk's designation, because not all vitamins contain an amine group. In 1922 at the early age of 31, he became the first Professor of Biochemistry at UCL and held that position until 1945 (in absentia from 1939). He was also Dean of the Faculty of Medical Sciences from 1929 to 1932.

In the 1930s, he succeeded in isolating pure vitamin A with the assistance of young researcher M. B. Donald. Also in the 1930s, he became increasingly aware of the need to apply the new science of nutrition in practice. This awareness, combined with his interest in gastronomy, led him to study the English diet over the previous 500 years. He published the results of this study as the book—co-authored with his future second wife Anne Wilbraham—The Englishman's Food: A History of Five Centuries of English Diet in 1939.

The Ministry of Food consulted him on the gas contamination of food at the outbreak of war and, on 16 October 1939, appointed him chief adviser on food contamination. Drummond interested himself in the various scientific aspects of the ministry's work and urged the creation of a co-ordinating unit within the ministry with a scientific liaison officer in charge.

On 1 February 1940, he was appointed Scientific Adviser to the Ministry of Food. When Lord Woolton became Minister of Food in April 1940, Drummond produced a plan for the distribution of food based on "sound nutritional principles". He recognised that rationing was the perfect opportunity to attack what he called "dietetic ignorance" and that, if successful, he would be able not just to maintain but to improve the nation's health.

Thanks to Drummond's advice, the effect of rationing was to introduce more protein and vitamins to the diet of the poorest in society, while the better off were obliged to cut their consumption of meat, fats, sugar, and eggs. Follow-up studies after the war showed that, despite rationing and the stresses of war, the population's health had improved. Drummond was Fullerian Professor of Physiology and Comparative Anatomy at the Royal Institution from 1941 to 1944. He was knighted in the 1944 New Year Honours and elected Fellow of the Royal Society on 16 March 1944.

In 1944, Drummond became an adviser on nutrition to Supreme Headquarters Allied Expeditionary Force and in 1945 to the allied control commissions for Germany and Austria. Also in 1945, he joined Boots Pure Drug Company as Director of Research, but remained seconded to the Ministry of Food until 1946. He was succeeded as Chief Scientific Advisor by Norman Charles Wright.

Drummond's career move to Boots at Nottingham was surprising to many of his former colleagues. It was also surprising that a man who had publicly advocated the exhaustive testing of new agrochemicals should have been responsible for the development of possibly harmful products such as Cornox, based on Dichlorprop, one of the chlorine-based phenoxy family of hormone weed-killers descended from ICI's wartime invention MCPA. Concerns about the lack of data on the toxicity of Dichlorprop led to its withdrawal from the UK market in 2003. On the other hand, Drummond's successor as Boots's director of research, Gordon Hobday, described Drummond as "an altruist" who had committed substantial research resources into cures for tropical diseases. Hobday had quickly cancelled this research, saying "there was never any money in it."

== Murder ==
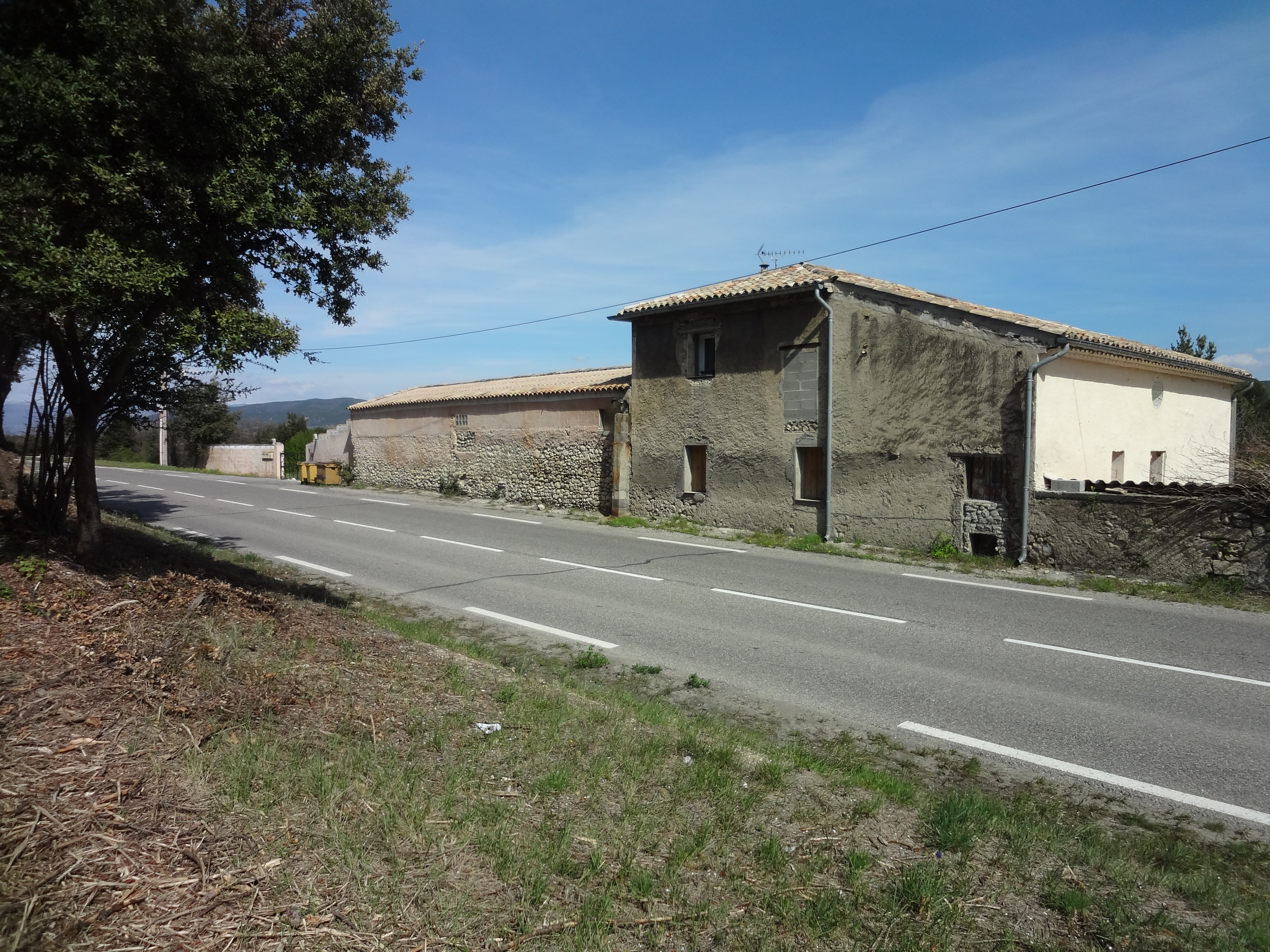
La Grand' Terre in 2013

On the evening of 4 August 1952, while on holiday in France in their green Hillman estate car, the Drummonds stopped by the side of the N96 main road, less than 200 metres from a farmhouse called La Grand'Terre. The site is marked by a milestone as exactly 6 km south of Peyruis and 6 km north of La Brillanne. A footpath leads from the site down to the banks of the river Durance.

La Grand'Terre was the home of the Dominicis, a family of Franco-Italian peasant farmers: the patriarch Gaston, his wife Marie, their son Gustave, Gustave's wife Yvette, and their baby son Alain. It was Gustave who claimed to have found the three dead bodies around 5:30 am on the morning of 5 August, and who flagged down a passing motorcyclist, Jean-Marie Olivier, telling him to fetch the police.

Anne's body was found near the car. Jack's lay on the other side of the N96, covered by a camp bed. They had both been shot by a Rock-Ola M1 carbine. The body of 10-year-old Elizabeth was found 77 metres away, down the path leading to the river, on the other side of the bridge over the railway. Her head had been brutally smashed in by the stock of the rifle. The barrel of the murder weapon was soon found in the river, with the stock a short distance downstream. It is likely that the force of the blow or blows used to kill Elizabeth had also broken the stock off the rifle.

The Drummonds are buried in the cemetery of the tourist town of Forcalquier, about 11 km west of Lurs. Near the stone bridge over the railway, a cross with children's votive offerings marks the spot where Elizabeth's body was found.

=== Aftermath ===
Gaston Dominici was convicted of the murders in November 1954 and sentenced to death by guillotine. However, both the police investigation and the conduct of the trial had been widely criticised and, after two inconclusive inquiries, President René Coty commuted the sentence to life imprisonment. Coty was succeeded in 1959 by President Charles de Gaulle, who ordered Dominici's release on humanitarian grounds, but did not pardon him, nor grant his request for a retrial. Alain Dominici, a baby at the time of the murders, has spent a lifetime campaigning for the innocence of his grandfather.

The murders remain a subject of hot dispute to this day in France, where they are referred to as l'Affaire Dominici. The same name was used for a 1955 British television documentary directed by Orson Welles, and for a 1973 film by Claude Bernard-Aubert.

== Awards and honours ==
- 1918 D.Sc. from University of London
- 1944 knighted
- 1944 elected FRS
- 1946 Commander (Civil Division) of the Order of Orange-Nassau
- 1946 elected Honorary Member of the New York Academy of Sciences
- 1947 Lasker Group Award of the APHA
- 1948 honorary doctorate from University of Paris
- United States Medal of Freedom with Silver Palms

== See also ==
- List of biochemists

== Works cited ==
- Badin, Raymond (2002). L'Erreur judiciaire du siècle (in French). Éd. Historia.
- Bernard-Aubert, Claude (1973). "L'affaire Dominici". The Dominici Affair. IMdb.
- "Biochemical Engineering at UCL". University College London. Archived from the original on 27 May 2007.
- Boyd Orr, John (September 1952). "Sir Jack Drummond, FRS". Obituary. Nature. 170 (4323): 402. Bibcode:1952Natur.170..402B. doi:10.1038/170402a0. S2CID 4182215.
- Campbell, Peter. "A Brief history of Biochemistry at UCL". University College London. Archived from the original (Microsoft Word) on 19 July 2004.
- Copping, A. M. (1964). "Sir Jack Cecil Drummond, F.R.S.-- A Biographical Sketch" (PDF). Journal of Nutrition. 82 (1): 3–9. doi:10.1093/jn/82.1.1. ISSN 0022-3166. PMID 14110938.
- Deniau, Jean-Charles; Sultan, Madeleine (2004). Dominici: C'était une affaire de famille (in French). L'Archipel. ISBN 2-84187-642-X.
- "The Drummond Lecture in Biochemistry". Queen Mary University of London. 9 December 2005. Archived from the original on 14 October 2006.
- Drummond, Jack (1918). "Some aspects of infant feeding". The Lancet. 2 (4963): 482–484. doi:10.1016/s0140-6736(01)02839-2.
- Drummond, Jack Cecil; Wilbraham, Anne (1958) [first published 1939]. The Englishman's food: A history of five centuries of English diet. revised by Dot Hollingworth. Jonathan Cape.
- Evans, C. L. (1952). "Sir Jack Drummond, F.R.S". Nature. 170 (4323): 401–402. Bibcode:1952Natur.170..401E. doi:10.1038/170401b0. PMID 12993177.
- Fergusson, James (2007a). The Vitamin Murders: Who Killed Healthy Eating in Britain?. Portobello Books. ISBN 978-1-84627-014-7.
- Fergusson, James (28 May 2007b). "Interview with Drummond's biographer, James Fergusson". Start the Week (Interview). Interviewed by Andrew Marr. (audio available from this page)
- Follet, René; Bresson, Pascal (2010). L'affaire Dominici (in French). Éd. Glénat. (Comic, 64pp)
- Giono, Jean (1955). Notes sur l'affaire Dominici (in French). Gallimard. ISBN 2-07-022829-0.
- Grimble, George (7 October 2019). "My route to Professorial Teaching Fellow: George Grimble". University College London.
- Guerrier, Eric (2 October 2007). L'affaire Dominici: Expertise du triple crime de Lurs (in French). Cheminements. ISBN 978-2-84478-603-6.
- Henley, John (29 July 2002). "Spy theory revives French murder mystery". The Guardian.
- Hollingsworth, D. F.; Wright, N. C. (1954). "Sir Jack Cecil Drummond, 1891-1952". The British Journal of Nutrition. 8 (4): 319–324. doi:10.1079/bjn19540049. PMID 13208951.
- Kirsta, Alix (17 April 2004). "J'accuse". The Guardian.
- "L'affaire Dominici par Orson Welles (documentaire complet 1955)". Original: Associated Rediffusion & Filmorsa; restored version: La Huit, Gray Film Sipirs. 2000 – via YouTube.
- MacLean, Helena. "Personal Biography – Sir Jack Drummond".
- Mossé, Claude (2003) [First published 1993]. Dominici innocent ! La Véritable histoire (in French). Éditions du Rocher. ISBN 2-268-04739-3.
- Nicholls, J. R. (1953). "Obituary: Sir Jack Drummond". Analyst. 78 (922): 3. Bibcode:1953Ana....78....3N. doi:10.1039/an9537800003. ISSN 0003-2654.
- Reymond, William. L'Affaire Dominici, les assassins retrouvés (in French). Éd. Flammarion.
- "ROYAL FREE & UNIVERSITY COLLEGE MEDICAL SCHOOL – (Drummond Prizes)". University College London. Archived from the original on 21 June 2004.
- "Royal Institution of Great Britain – Key officers and staff of the RI since 1799".
- "Royal Society – details of Sir Jack Drummond".
- Sinclair, H. M.; Osborne, Peter (2004). "Drummond, Sir Jack Cecil (1891–1952)". Oxford Dictionary of National Biography (online ed.). Oxford University Press. doi:10.1093/ref:odnb/32900. (Subscription, Wikipedia Library access or UK public library membership required.)
- "SIR JACK DRUMMOND, D.Sc., F.R.I.C., F.R.S., and family". The Journal of the Royal Institute of Public Health and Hygiene. 15 (9): 243. 1952. PMID 13000807.
- "SIR Jack Drummond, D.Sc., F.R.S". British Medical Journal. 2 (4780): 394–396. 1952. PMC 2021024. PMID 14944836.
- "UCL: Drummond Certificates". AIM25. August 2001 [First published 1999]. Archived from the original on 14 July 2006.
- Wilson, Bee (24 June 2007). "The Vitamin Murders: Who Killed Healthy Eating in Britain?". review of Fergusson's book. The Times. London.
- Young, F. G. (1954). "Jack Cecil Drummond. 1891-1952". Obituary Notices of Fellows of the Royal Society. 9 (1): 98–129. doi:10.1098/rsbm.1954.0008. JSTOR 769201.

Academic offices
Preceded by Frederick Keeble	Fullerian Professor of Physiology; 1941–1944	Succeeded by James Gray
