= Chapel of Notre Dame des Anges =

- Chapelle Notre-Dame-des-Anges de Lurs
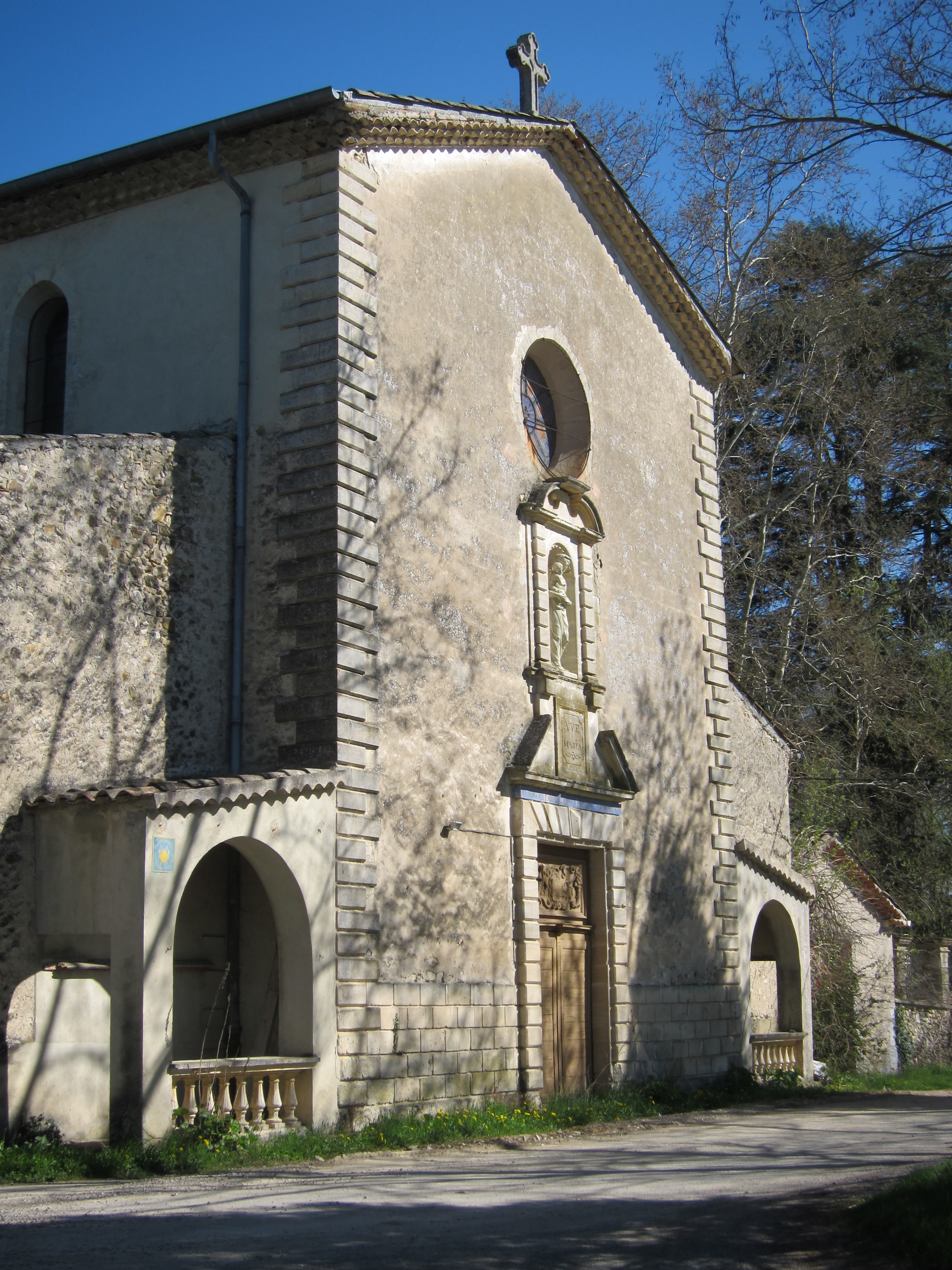
- Chapel of Notre Dame des Anges
- 43°56′46″N 5°52′3″E
- Country: France
- Denomination: Roman Catholic Church

Architecture
- Architectural type: Church
- Style: Gothic, Romanesque
- Completed: abt 1674

The Chapel of Notre Dame des Anges (French: Chapelle Notre-Dame-des-Anges) is a Roman Catholic church located near Lurs, Alpes-de-Haute-Provence, France. The chapel is a miraculous shrine and place of pilgrimage. It is in the Gothic and Romanesque architectural traditions.

== History ==
The site, between Apt and Sisteron on the Roman road Via Domitia, was once that of the Roman settlement of Alaunium, named after the local god Alaunius, which later became Aulun, and gave its name to the chapel that was built there, Sainte-Marie d'Aulun.

There is an ancient tradition to the effect that on the occasion of a cure wrought before here in 1665 on 2 August, (the Feast of Our Lady of the Angels), a choir of angels, it is said, was heard singing. The present name, "Notre Dame des Anges", in English means "Our Lady of the Angels". The chapel was later enlarged, the ancient building forming the crypt of the later one, and a community of Franciscan Recollects was established there to tend the shrine. The complex was completed around 1674 and underwent substantial repairs in the 1750s.

The chapel has gained a reputation for miraculous cures, and pilgrimages still take place three times a year.

== Trivia ==
- Dutch secondary school Notre Dame des Anges is named after the chapel.
