= Dorothy F. Hollingsworth =

British nutritionist and scientist

Dorothy Hollingsworth OBE
- Born: 10 May 1916
- Died: 16 February 1994 (aged 77)
- Education: King's College, Newcastle

Dorothy Frances Hollingsworth OBE (10 May 1916 – 16 February 1994) was a British nutritionist and scientist, who demonstrated that the quality of the British diet was greatly improved by rationing. Hollingsworth both documented and contributed to the improvements in British nutrition during the Second World War. She worked with Jack Drummond at the Ministry of Food during the 1940s, and completed a revised edition of The Englishman's Food after Drummond's death. For twenty-one years, she was responsible for the nutrition bureau at the Ministry of Food and later, in the 1970s, became the director of the British Nutrition Foundation.

== Early life ==
Dorothy Hollingsworth was the daughter of Arthur Hollingsworth, a pharmacist and Dorothy Coldwell, and spent her childhood in Newcastle upon Tyne. She had a degree in chemistry from King's College, Newcastle (Durham University), graduating in 1937. Her original plan was to become a chemistry teacher but then decided to study Dietetics at the Royal Infirmary of Edinburgh, under Sister Ruth Pybus, a pioneer in the science of nutrition. She qualified in 1939. When the Second World War started, she worked for two years as a dietician at the Royal Northern Hospital providing meals to patients and running the hospital's dietetics department.

== Career ==
In 1941, Hollingsworth took a job at the Ministry of Food where she worked on a wartime food survey, designed to find out how well the population of Britain was coping with the shortages of rationing. This project later, in 1945, became the Family Food Survey, and in 1950 was reborn as the National Food Survey, which was an important resource for measuring the nutritional status of British people in the 1950s. In 1945, her job was transferred to work under Jack Drummond, the chief scientific adviser to the government at the Ministry of Food. In 1949, she took over from Magnus Pyke as the principal scientific officer at the Ministry as the head of the nutrition bureau. Her job covered all aspects of national nutrition: statistics on diet, food science, education. In 1958, she was appointed an OBE in recognition of her public service to nutrition in Britain.

In 1952, Hollingsworth's former colleague Jack Drummond was brutally murdered, together with his wife and daughter, while on holiday in France. Drummond had been intending to produce a new updated version of his book The Englishman's Food, originally published in 1939. The publishers now asked Dorothy Hollingsworth to prepare the new edition, taking account of 'advances in nutrition' that had occurred in the years since 1939. Hollingsworth wrote that 'much was accomplished during the Second World War' in nutrition because 'owing to rationing and control, it was difficult to obtain an ill-balanced diet'. Her data showed that the 1947 diet was better than the 1934-38 diet 'the most striking improvements being in calcium, vitamin B1, nicotinic acid, protein (mainly in vegetable protein) and vitamin C'. Among other observations, Hollingsworth noted that, while there were still 'class differences in the consumption of vegetables and fruit' in Britain, there was, since the war, a much smaller difference between the classes in vegetable consumption. She also noted the falling popularity of milk puddings such as 'rice, tapioca and sago'.

In 1970, Hollingsworth left her government job and was appointed as director of the British Nutrition Foundation, a nutrition body funded by the food industry. In her capacity as director of the BNF, she wrote letters to the papers defending the nutritional practices of the food industry. In a letter to The Times attacking the term 'factory farming', Hollingsworth argued that intensive farming of livestock meant that families on low incomes 'have been able to purchase a reasonable variety of meats for the first time ever'. She remained in her position at the BNF until 1977 and edited two volumes based on conferences organised by the BNF.

In addition, Hollingsworth served on the board of many scientific and nutrition-based organisations. She was chairman of the British Dietetic Association (1947-9) and a member of the board of the Medical Research Council committee on food and nutrition research (1970-1974).

== Personal life ==
Hollingsworth said in Who's Who that she enjoyed the appreciation of music and theatre, gardening and conversation with intelligent and humorous friends. Colleagues in the world of British nutrition remembered her as a person of 'good humour' with a love of travel; in meetings, she had a 'forthright and outspoken manner'. Throughout her career, she was passionately interested in working to ensure the nutritional adequacy of the British diet. She never married.

== Works ==
- The Englishman's Food: Five Centuries of English Diet, London: Jonathan Cape, 1957
- 1973 (ed.) Nutritional Problems in a Changing World London: Applied Science Publishers, 1973
- 1976 (ed. with Elizabeth Morse): People and Food Tomorrow London: Applied Science Publishers, 1976
