= Ubbergen =

- Village and former municipality
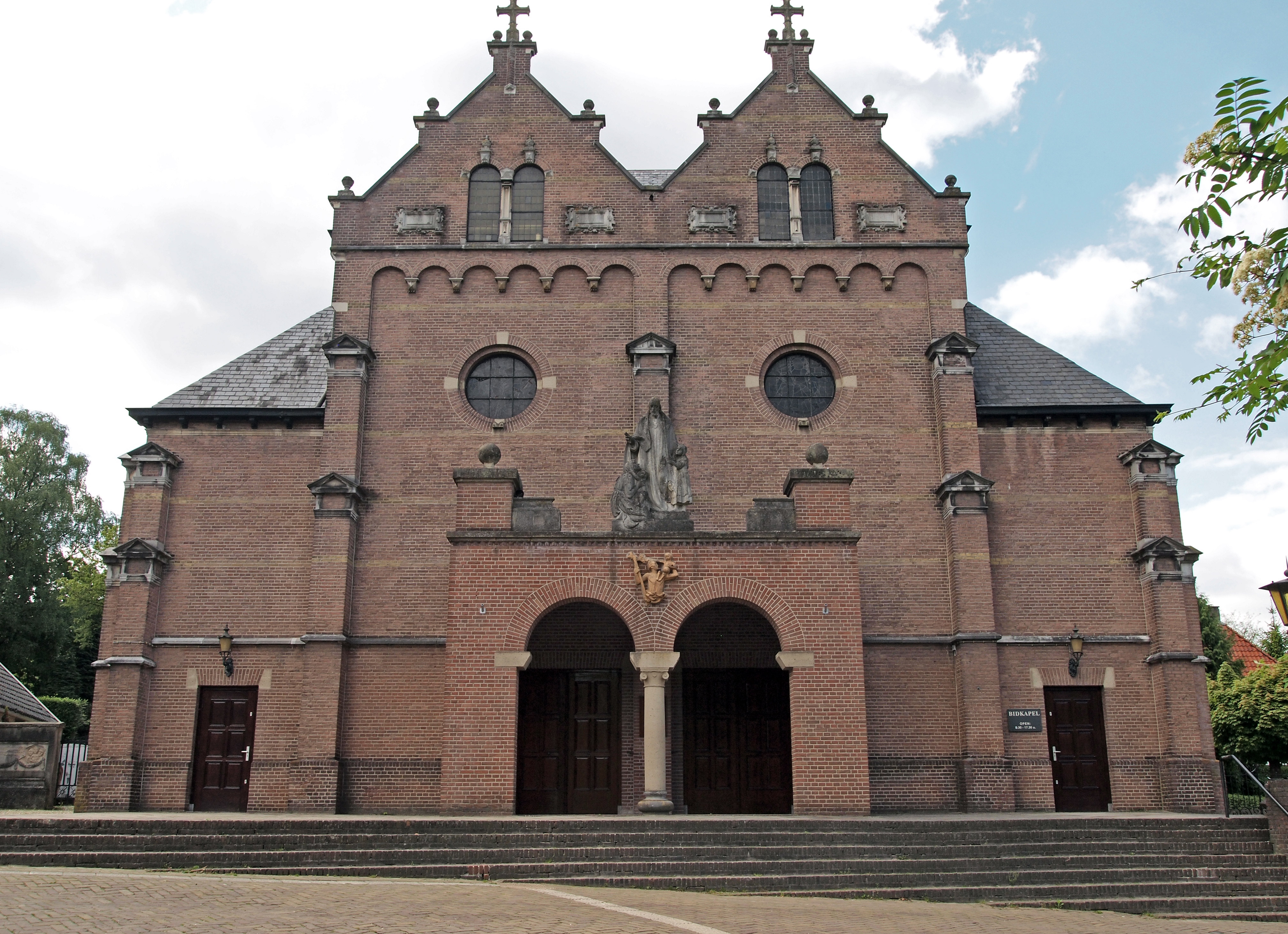
- Church in Beek

- Flag Coat of arms

- Location in Gelderland

- Location in the province of Gelderland Ubbergen (Netherlands)
- Coordinates: 51°50′N 5°55′E
- Country: Netherlands
- Province: Gelderland
- Municipality: Berg en Dal

Area
  - Total: 0.78 km^{2} (0.30 sq mi)
- Elevation: 13 m (43 ft)

Population (2021)
  - Total: 475
- Demonym: Ubberger
- Time zone: UTC+1 (CET)
  - Summer (DST): UTC+2 (CEST)
- Postcode: 6574
- Area code: 024
- Website: www.ubbergen.nl

Ubbergen (Dutch pronunciation: [ˈʏbɛrɣə(n)]) is a village and former municipality in the eastern Netherlands, in the province of Gelderland. On 1 January 2015 it merged into the enlarged municipality of Groesbeek, renamed Berg en Dal from 1 January 2016.

== Notable people ==
Notable people who were born in Ubbergen include:

- Don Burgers (1932–2006), politician for the KVP and the CDA
- Amber (born 1970), Dutch-German singer, songwriter and music producer
- Yelmer Buurman (born 1987), professional racing driver

== Gallery ==
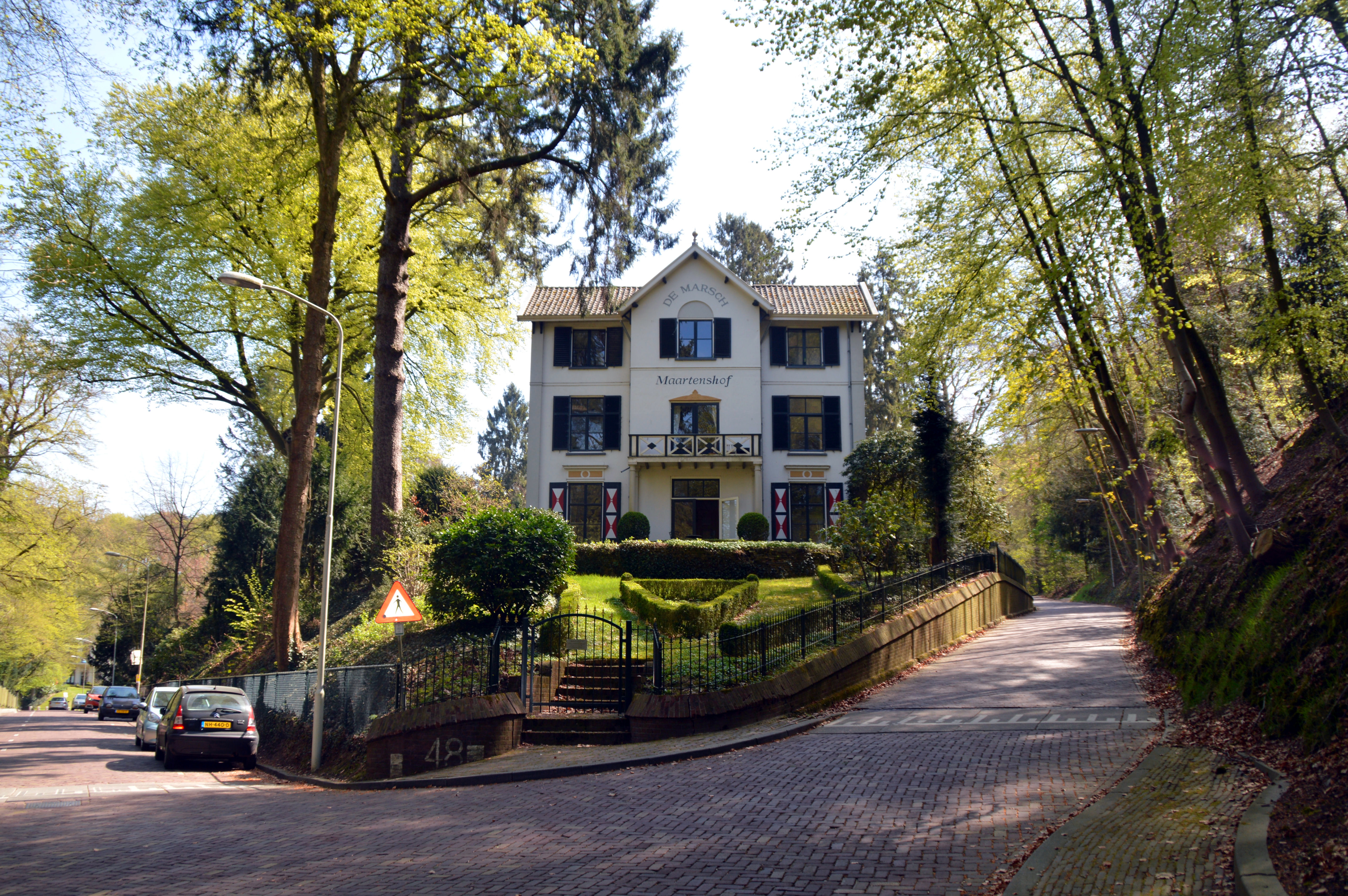
Villa 'De Maartenshof' on the Rijkstraatweg

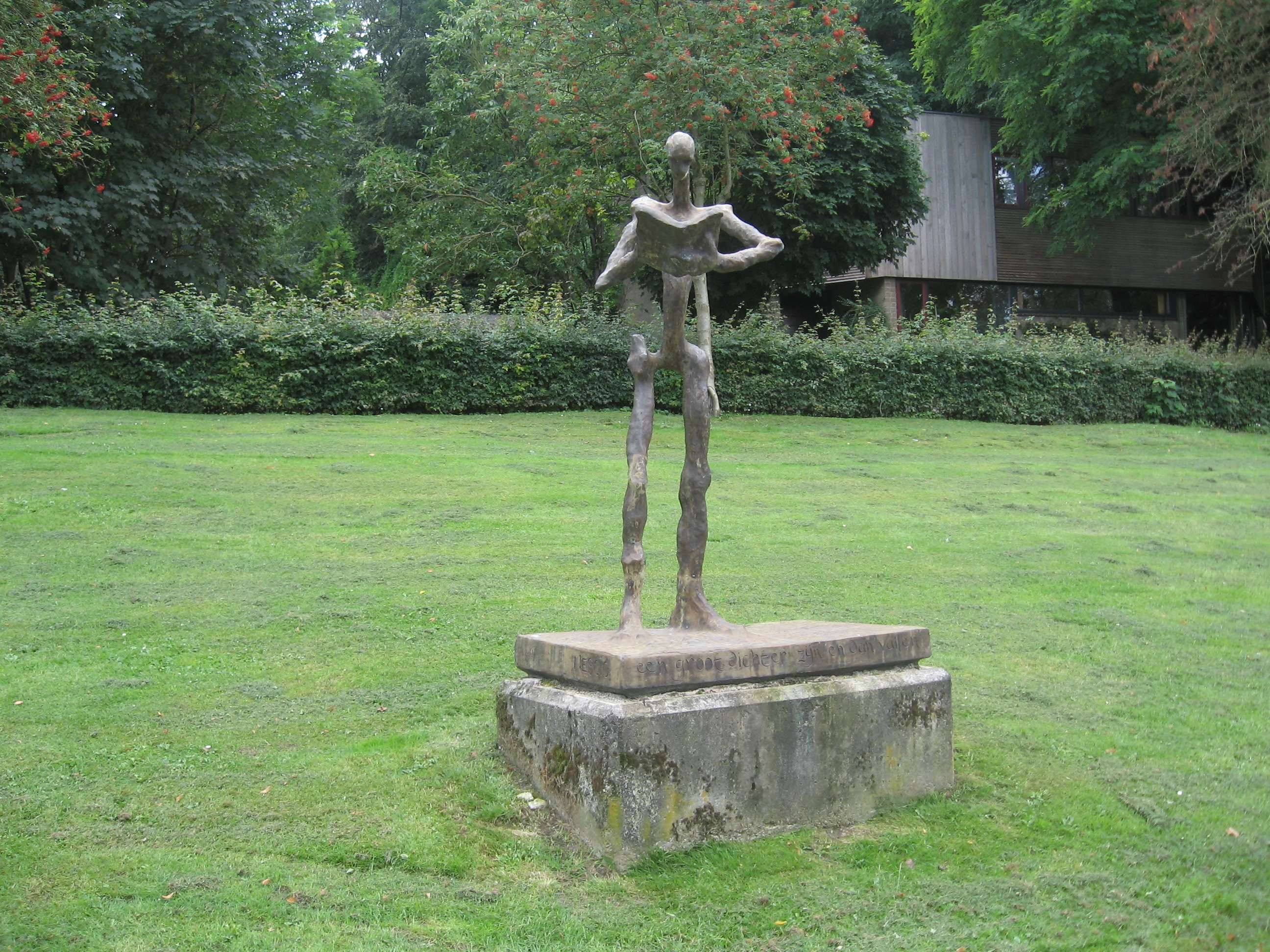
Statue of Nescio (1991) on the Rijksstraatweg

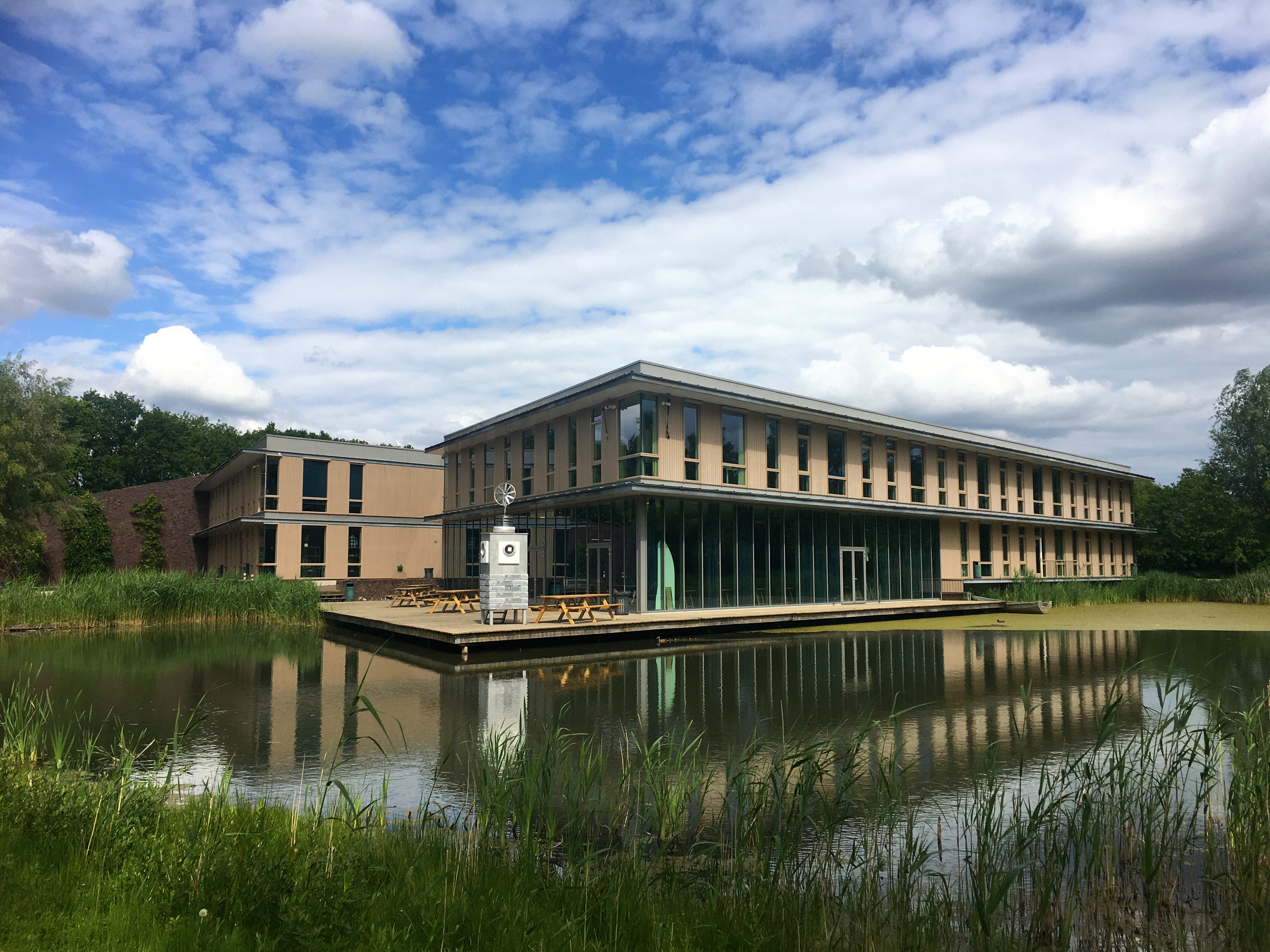
The school building of Notre Dame des Anges

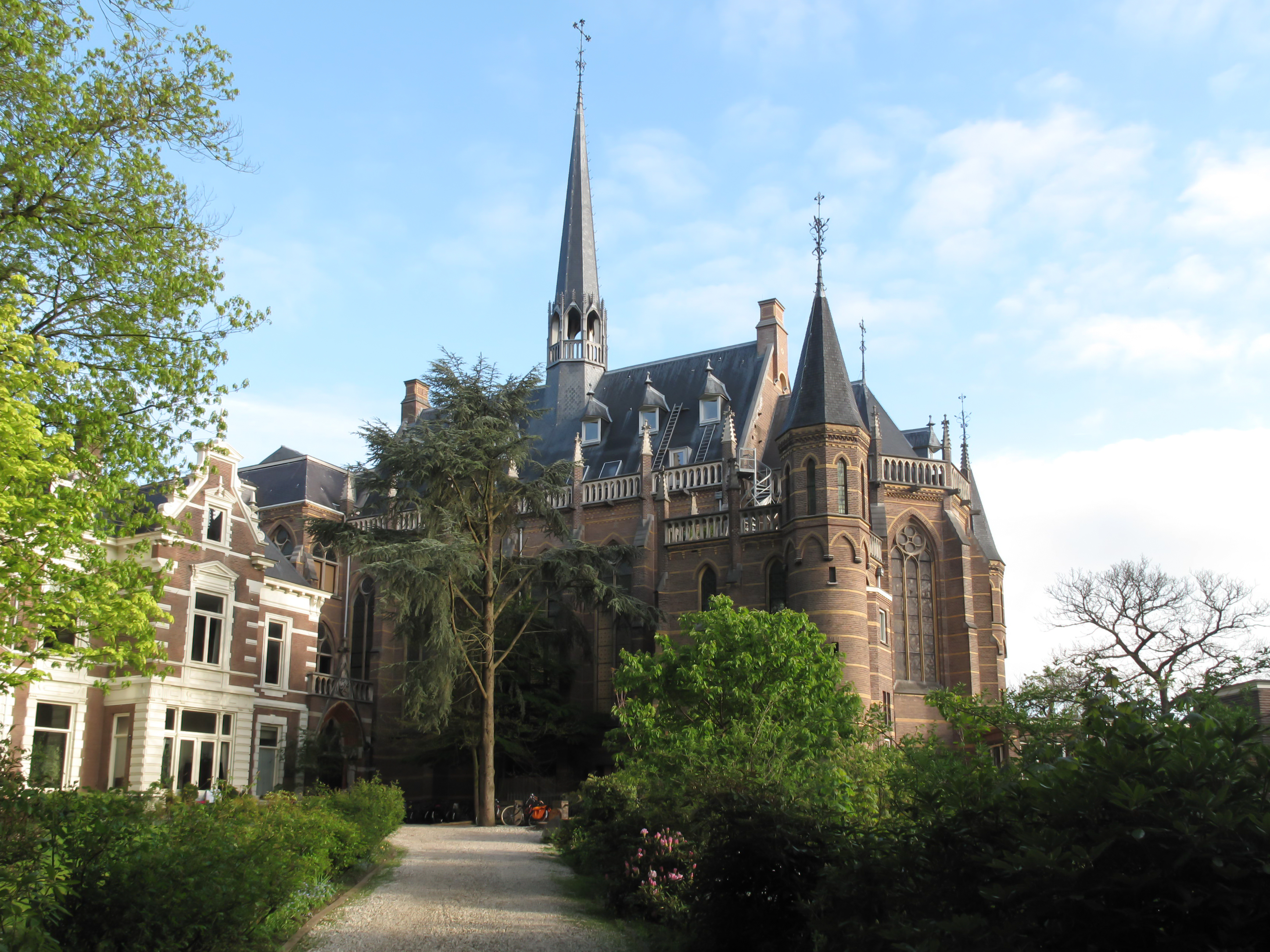
'De Refter': monumental building complex

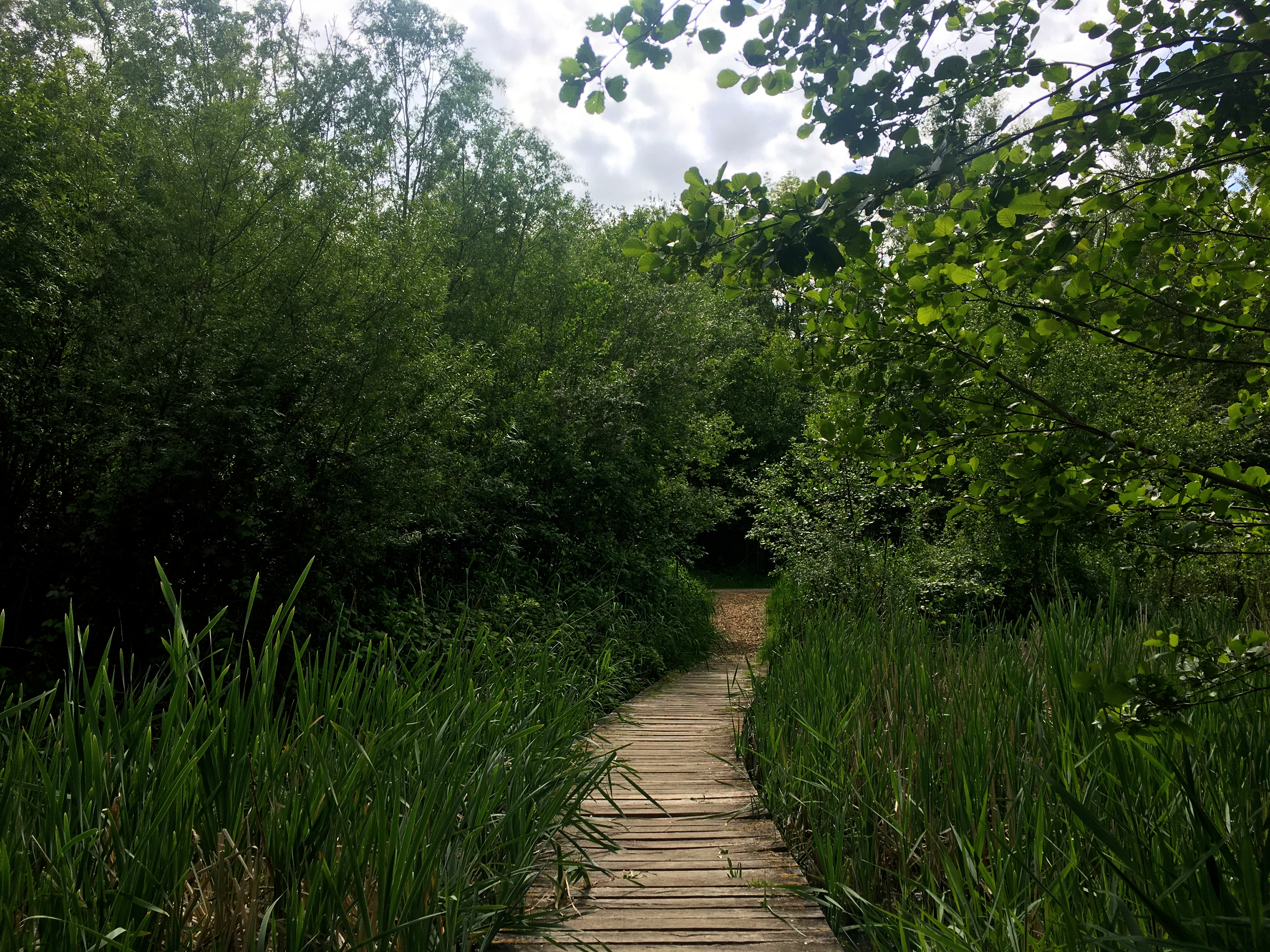
The 'Bronnenbos': a carr in Ubbergen
