= Lurs, Alpes-de-Haute-Provence =

Lurs
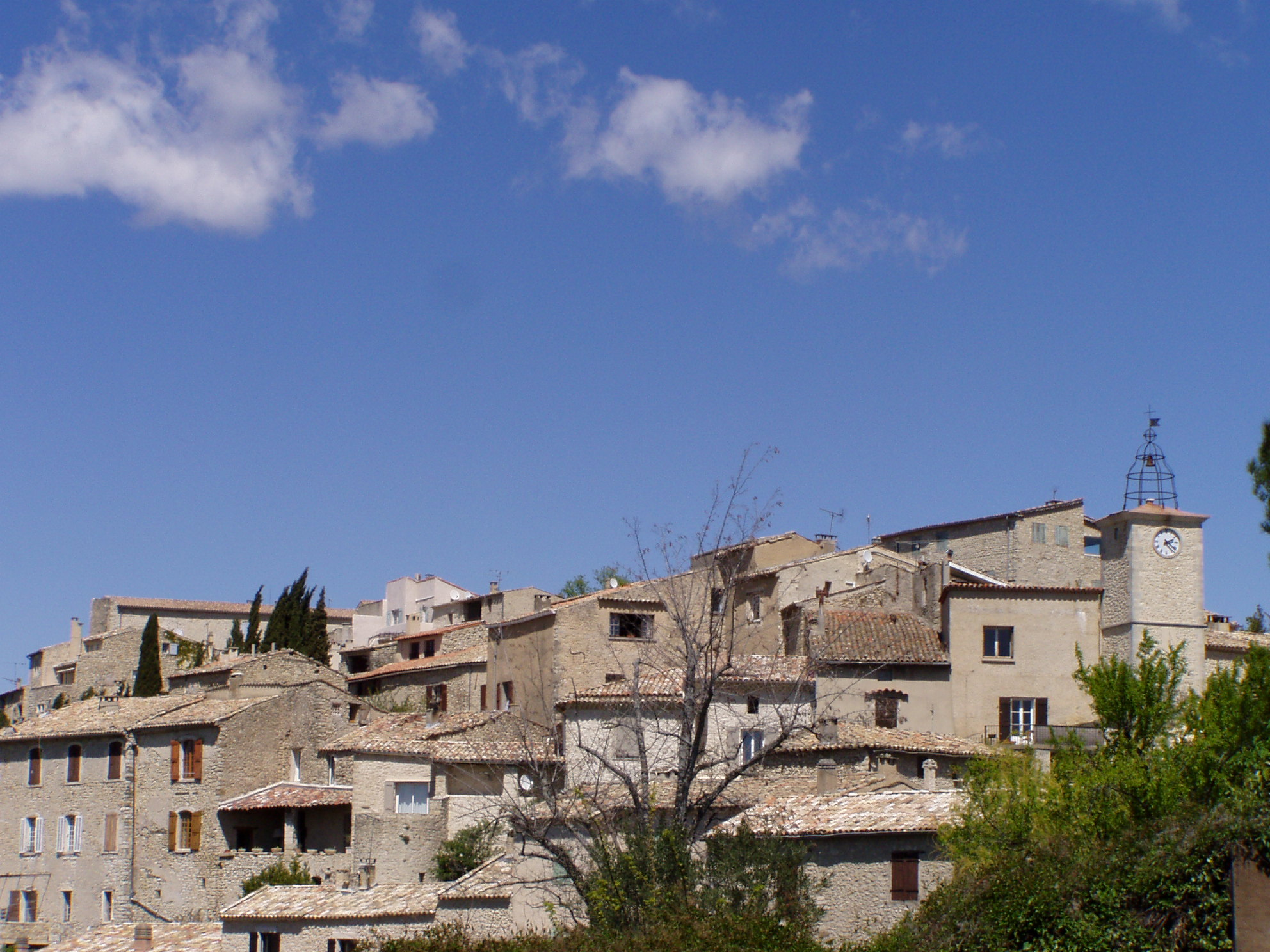
- A general view of the village of Lurs

- Coat of arms
- Location of Lurs
- Location within France Location within Provence-Alpes-Côte d'Azur
- Coordinates: 43°58′14″N 5°53′23″E
- Country: France
- Region: Provence-Alpes-Côte d'Azur
- Department: Alpes-de-Haute-Provence
- Arrondissement: Forcalquier
- Canton: Forcalquier
- Intercommunality: Pays de Forcalquier et Montagne de Lure

Government
  - Mayor (2026–32): Romain Buisson
- Area^{1}: 22.48 km^{2} (8.68 sq mi)
- Elevation: 612 m (2,008 ft)
- Highest elevation: 621 m (2,037 ft)
- Lowest elevation: 340 m (1,120 ft)
- Population (2023): 385
  - Density: 17.1/km^{2} (44.4/sq mi)
- Time zone: UTC+01:00 (CET)
  - Summer (DST): UTC+02:00 (CEST)
- INSEE/Postal code: 04106 /04700
- ^{1} French Land Register data, which excludes lakes, ponds, glaciers > 1 km^{2} (0.386 sq mi or 247 acres) and river estuaries.

Lurs is a commune in the Alpes-de-Haute-Provence department in the Provence-Alpes-Côte d'Azur region in southeastern France.

It is noted for the triple murder nearby of Sir Jack Drummond and his wife and daughter in 1952.

== Population ==
Historical population
Year	Pop.	±% p.a.
1968	305	—
1975	275	−1.47%
1982	284	+0.46%
1990	320	+1.50%
1999	347	+0.90%
2007	381	+1.18%
2012	377	−0.21%
2017	382	+0.26%
2023	385	+0.13%
Source: INSEE

The inhabitants are referred to as Lursiens in French.

== See also ==
- Chapel of Notre Dame des Anges
- Communes of the Alpes-de-Haute-Provence department
