= Don Burgers =

Dutch politician (1932–2006)

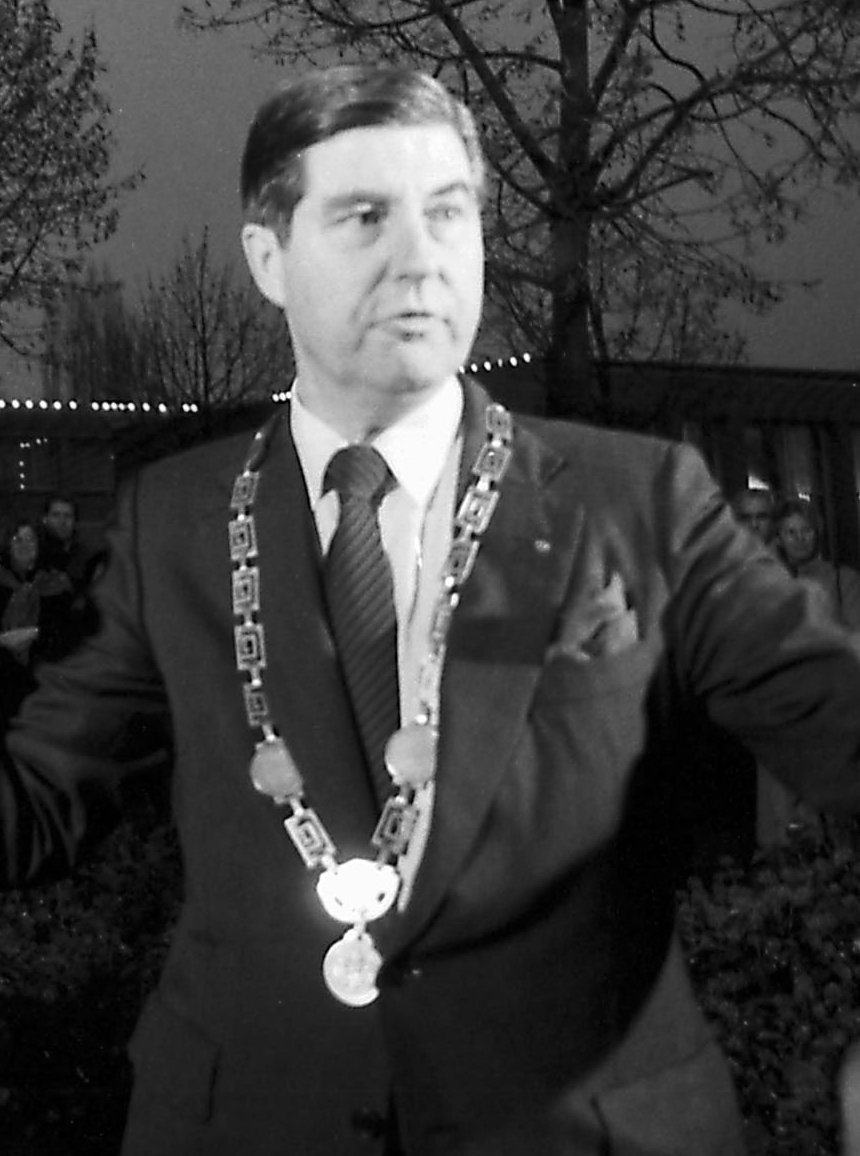
D.C.B. Burgers

Donatus Clemens Bernard "Don" Burgers (26 February 1932 – 30 January 2006) was a Dutch politician for the KVP and later the CDA.

Burgers was born in Ubbergen. After working for the police and later the government he was elected mayor of Haaren in 1972, and in 1979 became mayor of Rosmalen until 1989. In that year he became mayor of 's-Hertogenbosch, the capital of the Dutch province of North Brabant. In 1996 he retired. He remained active after his retirement as acting mayor of Middelburg (1996–1997; the capital of the province of Zeeland), Almelo (1997–1998) and again of Middelburg (2000–2001).

He was also vice-chairman of the church board of the St. John's Cathedral and honorary consul to Romania.

Burgers died at 73 years of age during a vacation in Innsbruck, due to a pulmonary embolism. He is buried at begraafplaats Groenendaal in Orthen, a neighbourhood of 's-Hertogenbosch.
