= Ambilici =

Gallic tribe of ancient Noricum

The Ambilici (Gaulish: Ambilicoi, 'those dwelling on both sides of the Licos'), also attested in Latin inscriptions as the Ambilini, were a Gallic tribe dwelling in the valley of the Gail river (southern Austria) during the Roman period. They formed one of the civitates of Noricum and appear among the Norican peoples who erected honorific dedications to the imperial family on the Magdalensberg in the late 1st century BC. Under Claudius, their territory was attached to one of the newly founded Norican municipia, whether to Virunum or to Aguntum.

== Name ==
They are mentioned as Ambílikoi (Ἀμβίλικοι; var. Ἀμβλικοί) by Ptolemy (2nd c. AD), and as Ambilini and Ambilinei in the dedications erected by the Norican civitates on the Magdalensberg in the late 1st century BC. Patrizia de Bernardo Stempel identifies the epigraphic Ambilini as the latinized form of Ambilici.

The ethnic name Ambilici is a latinized form of Gaulish Ambilicoi, meaning 'those (living) on both sides of the river Licos', the Licos being the ancient name of the Gail river. The name belongs to a closed group of four regional ethnonyms formed with the Celtic preposition ambi- ('around, on both sides of') and a river name, alongside the Ambidravi, the Ambisavi and the Ambisontes. De Bernardo Stempel regards these compounds as comparatively recent formations. The river name itself appears to derive from the Celtic word lic(c)a, glossed as 'flat stone' by Xavier Delamarre and as 'rock' by de Bernardo Stempel.

Alternatively, Karl Strobel has proposed explaining the form Ambilini as a dialectal shortening of *Ambi-lagh-inos, formed on *Laghis/Lachis as the ancient name of the Gail. He derives the name of the road station Bilachinium (from *Ambilachinium) from the same base.

== Geography ==
The Ambilici dwelt along the Licos river (modern Gail). The Barrington Atlas locates their territory south of the Ambidravi, east of the Laianci, Saevates and Catubrini, north of the Carni. According to Karl Strobel, their civitas included, besides the Gail valley, the upper Val Canale with the road stations Bilachinium (at Camporosso) and Meclaria (Maglern-Straßfried) on the imperial road. The boundary with Italy (Venetia et Histria) ran north of the Pontebba stream and of the Valle Dogna. Peter Scherrer places them in the Gail valley in the region of the Gurina plateau, a settlement site possibly identical with the Ilounon listed by Ptolemy among the towns of Noricum.

Neither the Ambilici nor the neighbouring peoples possessed a proto-urban central settlement. Strobel notes that the upper Gail valley, like the territories of the neighbouring Saevates and Laianci, belonged culturally to the Fritzens-Sanzeno culture group.

== History ==
In 16 BC, Norici and Pannonians invaded Histria and were repulsed by the proconsul of Illyricum, Publius Silius Nerva. The kingdom of Noricum came under Roman control in 16–15 BC. According to Strobel, the population of the former kingdom was organised into eight civitates in 14/13 BC. A provincial census followed in 13/12 BC, and a provincial assembly (concilium provinciae) was instituted by 12 BC. The Ambilini were one of the nine Norican civitates peregrinae known by name, alongside the Norici, Ambidravi, Uperaci, Saevates, Laianci, Ambisontes, Elveti and Alauni.

The eight Norican civitates, with the Ambilini among them, erected honorific dedications to members of the imperial family at the Roman trading settlement on the Magdalensberg, the early Virunum. Marble tablets are preserved from the dedications to Livia, the wife of Augustus, and to his daughter and granddaughter, both named Iulia (Julia the Elder and Julia the Younger). In each preserved list, the Ambilini stand in second place after the Norici, the peoples being named in geographical order. The dedications are traditionally dated to around 10–9 BC. Strobel instead connects them with the marriage of Iulia and Tiberius in February 11 BC and dates the monument to the first half of 11 BC.

Under Claudius, five Norican towns became Roman municipia: Celeia, Virunum, Teurnia, Aguntum and Iuvavum. The attribution of the Ambilini within the new municipal organisation is disputed. Peter Scherrer, who assigned two civitates to the territory of each municipium, attached them together with the Norici to Virunum, a reconstruction that Marjeta Šašel Kos considers hypothetical. Franz Glaser included the Gail valley in an extensive territory of Teurnia, a view followed by Christian Gugl and rejected by Strobel. Strobel himself assigns the Ambilini, together with the Saevates and the Laianci, to the municipium Claudium Aguntum, either as an attributed civitas or as a pagus.
