= Ambidravi =

Gallic tribe

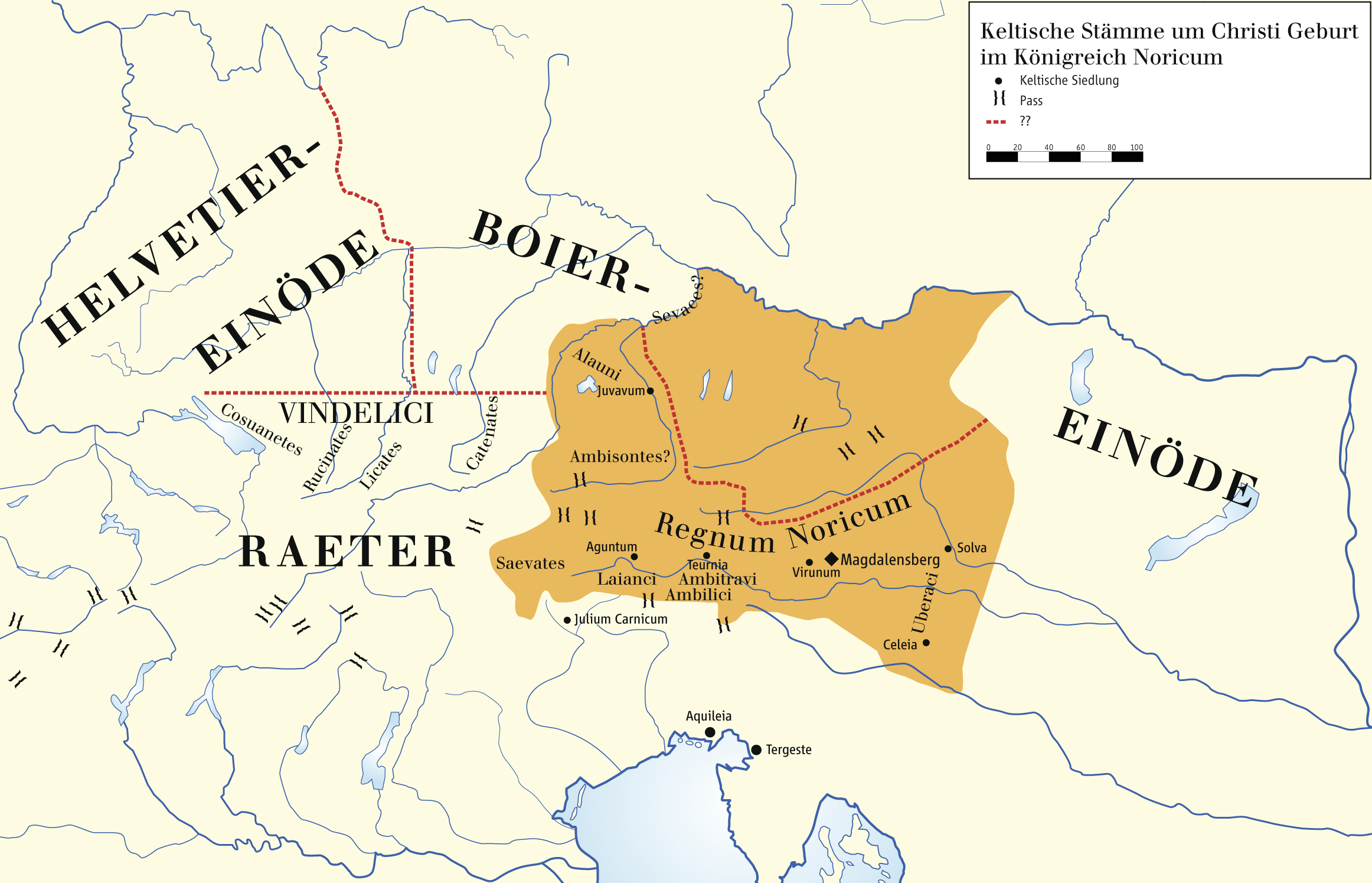

The Ambidravi (Gaulish: *Ambidrauoi, 'those around the Dravus') were a Gallic tribe dwelling around the upper Drava river, near Teurnia (Austria), during the Roman period.

== Name ==
They are mentioned as Ambídranoi (Ἀμβίδρανοι) by Ptolemy (2nd c. AD), and as Ambidr(avi) and [A]mbidr(avi) on inscriptions.

The ethnic name Ambidravi is a latinized form of the Gaulish *Ambridauoi, which means 'around the Dravus', that is 'those living around the Dravus river'.

== Geography ==
The Ambidravi lived around the upper Dravas river (modern Drava), near the city of Teurnia. The Barrington Atlas locates their territory north of the Ambilici, east of the Laianci.
