= Catubrini =

Gallic tribe

The Catubrini were a Gallic tribe dwelling in Cadore (Veneto) during the Roman period.

== Name ==
They are mentioned as Catubrinorum on inscriptions.

== Geography ==
The Catubrini lived in the region of Cadore (Catubrium), in the upper valley of the Piave river, north of Bellunum. The Barrington Atlas locates their territory south of the Saevates, west of the Ambilici and Carni, north of the Misquilenses, east of the Tuliassi.
