= Ambisontes =

Gallic tribe

The Ambisontes (Gaulish: 'those around the Isontia') were a Gallic tribe dwelling in the upper Salzach valley during the Roman period.

== Name ==
They are mentioned as Ambisontes by Pliny (1st c. AD), and as Ambēsóntioi (Ἀμβησόντιοι) by Ptolemy (2nd c. AD).

The Gaulish ethnonym Ambisontes means 'the people from around the Isontia', stemming from the root *amb(i)- ('around, on both sides') attached to the name of the river Isontia (modern Salzach). The hydronym itself, while not necessarily Celtic, is most likely of Indo-European origin, and can be derived from the stem *[h₁]ish₁-ont- ('she who moves quickly').

== Geography ==
The Ambisontes lived in the upper valley of the Salzach river. The Barrington Atlas locates their territory north of the Saevates and Laianci, south of the Alauni, and east of the Breuni and Cosuanetes.

== History ==
They are mentioned by Pliny the Elder as one of the Alpine tribes conquered by Rome in 16–15 BC, and whose name was engraved on the Tropaeum Alpium.
