= Burgruine Straßfried =

Castle ruin in Austria

Coordinates: 46°32′59″N 13°39′39″E

- Carinthia, Austria
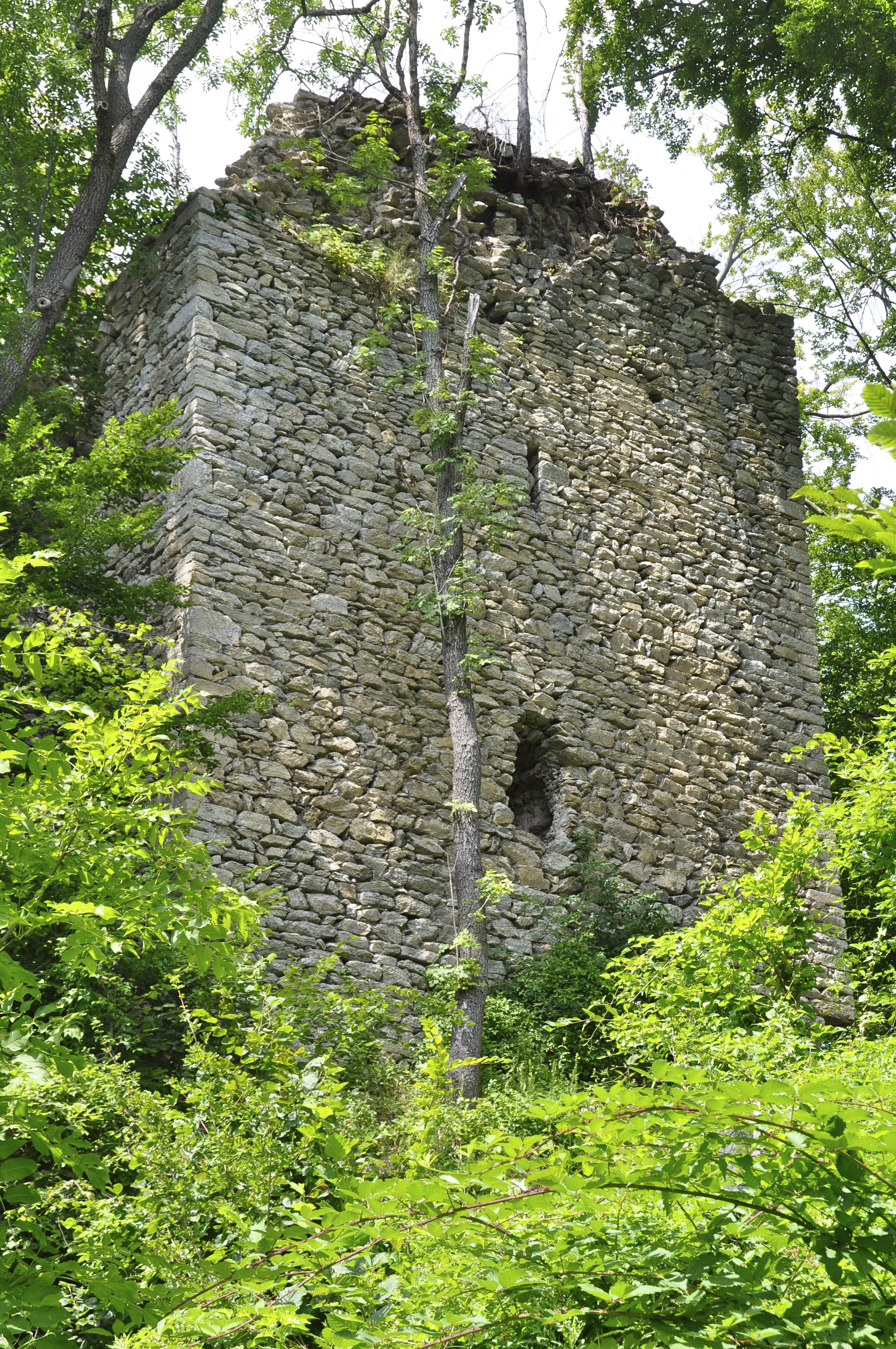

Site information
- Type: Hilltop castle
- Condition: Ruined

Site history
- Built: Before 1279

Burgruine Straßfried is a castle in Carinthia, Austria. It is located next to the Austrian–Italian border by Arnoldstein in Carinthia.

== History ==
The name of the castle means "Ruins of Castle Straßfried" and draws attention to its location and its earlier strategic importance. Straßfried lies on a forested hill at the junction of roads from Italy with another from the Gail River valley. The castle is first documented as Castrum Strazvrid in 1279, when the estate was captured by the Habsburg King Rudolf. It was left to the diocese of Bamberg. In the 13th century, the castle was expanded to guard the important trade routes the castle lay on.

Of the original twin-tower facility, only the eastern of the two has been preserved. Considerable parts of the wall still remain, but only small parts of the palace are intact. It was severely damaged during the Napoleonic Wars by French forces, who blew up part of the fortress in 1797 during their occupation of Strasbourg.

== See also ==
- List of castles in Austria
