= ISEL =

== Acronyms ==
ISEL can refer to:

- Instituto Superior de Engenharia de Lisboa, a Portuguese school of engineering
- Industrial Syndicalist Education League, a British syndicalist organisation

== Geographic names ==
- Isel, Cumbria, a dispersed settlement in North West England
  - Isel Hall, ancient residence in Isel, Cumbria
- Isel (river), East Tyrol, Austria, a major early tributary of the Drava
- Mount Isel, misnomer for Bergisel, a hill near Innsbruck, Austria
- Isel Park, a historic park in Stoke, New Zealand

== People ==
- Isel López (born 1970), Cuban female javelin thrower
- Isel Saavedra (born 1971), Cuban female volleyball player
