= Teurnia =

Coordinates: 46°49′23.91″N 13°26′37.49″E

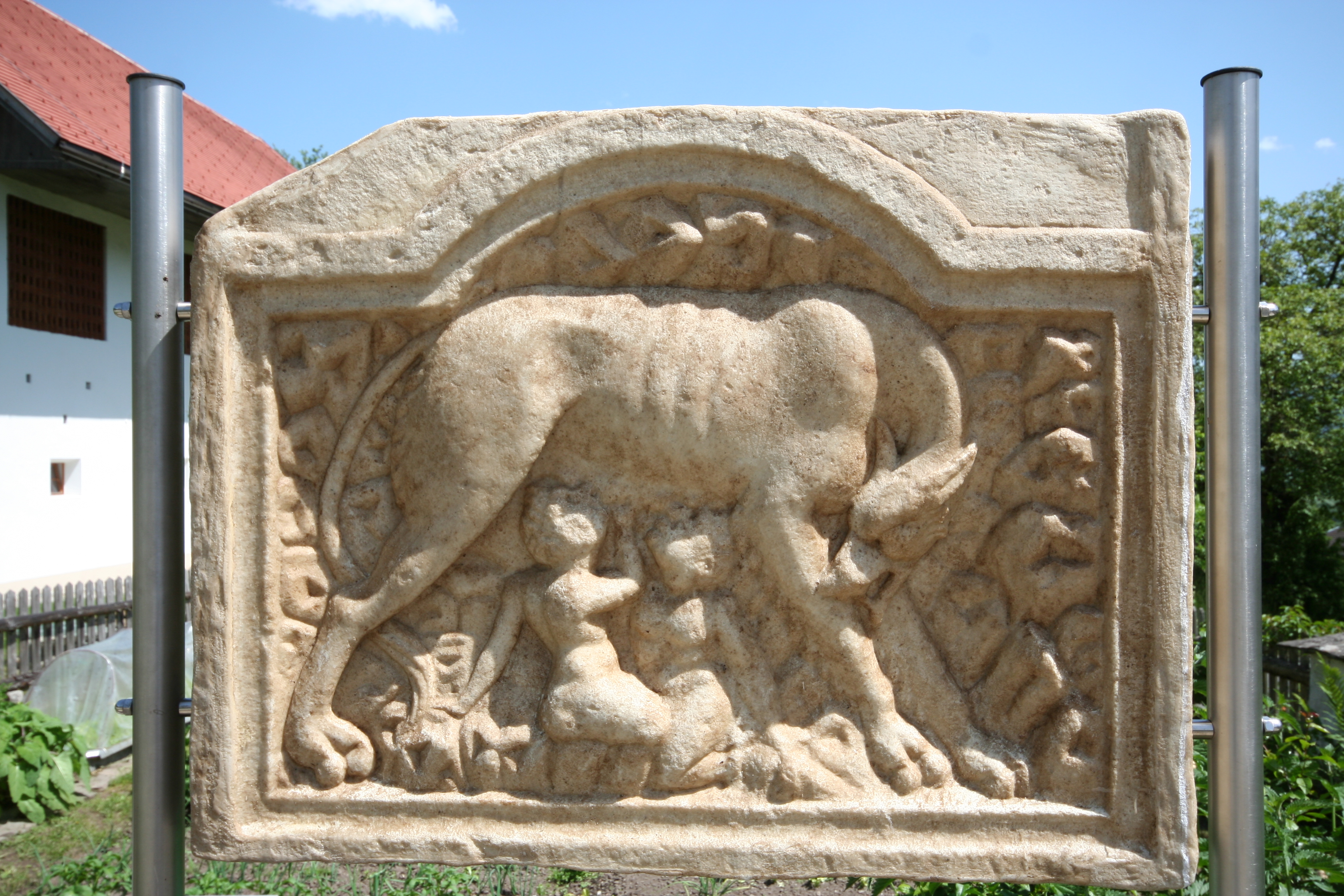
Roman relief stone at Teurnia

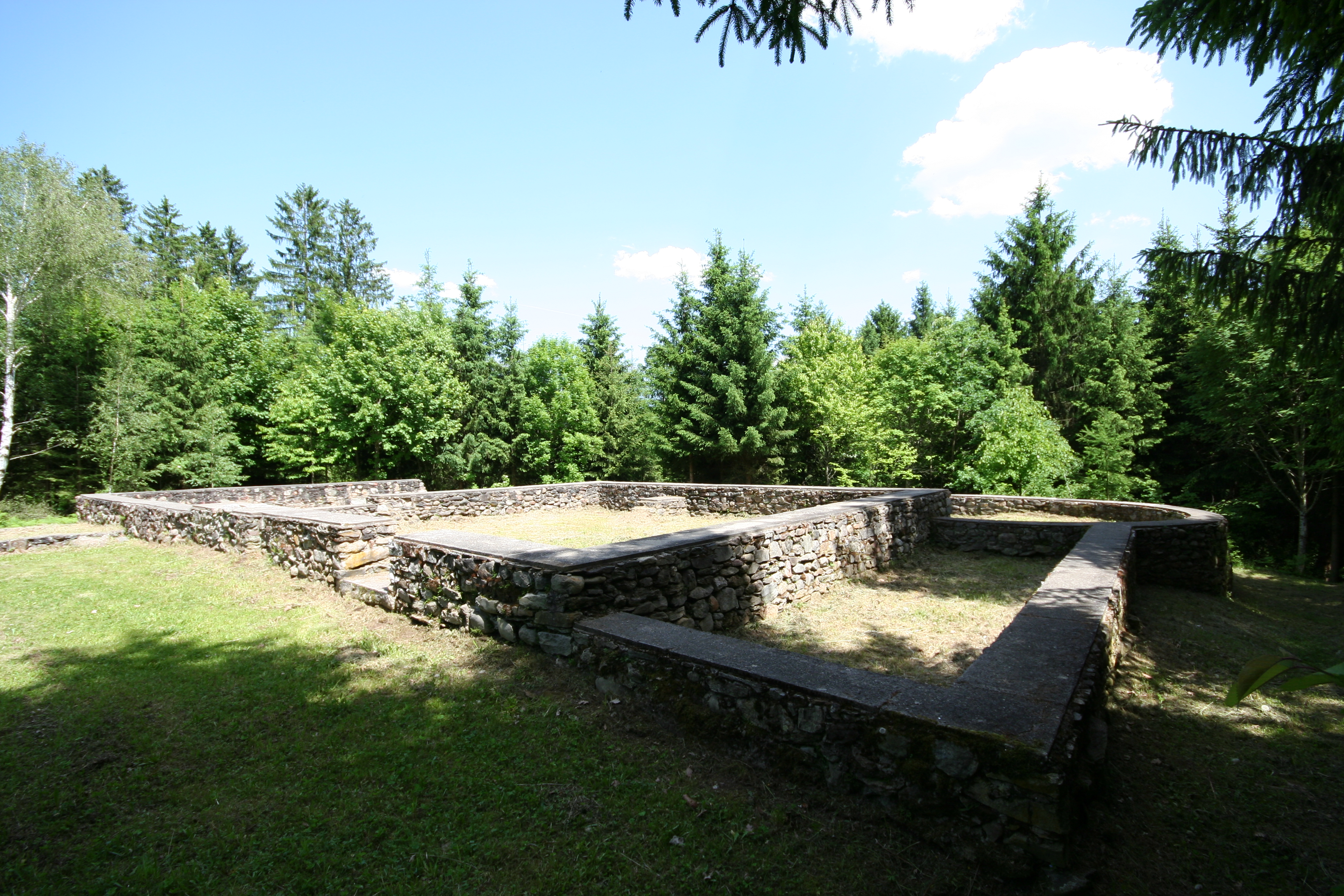
Remains of an urban villa at Teurnia

Teurnia (later Tiburnia) was a Roman city (municipium). Today its ruins lie in the western Austrian state of Carinthia. In late antiquity it was also a bishop's see (today being a Catholic titular see), and towards the end of Roman times it was mentioned as the capital of the province of Noricum mediterraneum.

== History ==
Ancient Teurnia was situated on a wooded hill at the village of St. Peter in Holz (Slovenian: Sveti Peter v Lesu) in the municipality of Lendorf in the Lurnfeld valley, four kilometres to the west of Spittal an der Drau in Upper (i.e. western) Carinthia, Austria. As early as 1100 BC, people had lived there on Holzerberg hill, which may well have also been the centre of the Celtic Taurisci nation before c. 50 AD the Roman town was built with a forum, a market basilica, a temple on the city's Capitol, Thermae or public baths, terraced housing on two terraces, and a temple dedicated to Grannus, the Celtic counterpart deity of Aesculap, god of medicine and healing, but in Teurnia invoked as Grannus Apollo. Usually older hill-top settlements were moved by the Romans to lower-lying areas with the one exception of the oppidum at Teurnia in the tribal region of the Ambidravi, where old names are said to have been retained and no renaming took place.

Teurnia was one of the largest places in all Noricum with, in its peak period, a population of 30,000. Towards the end of the Empire the population decreased; people left the housing terraces, and the slopes being no longer suitable for agriculture were used as cemeteries. At the same time walls went up surrounding the hilltop with material from the deserted houses.

== Ecclesiastical history ==
By the 4th century, Teurnia was already a Christian town and it was a bishop's see until the city's decline and its end in 610.

== Excavations ==
Holzerberg hill was a well-known place of antique finds as early as the Middle Ages. Many spolias of buildings in the area come from here. Interest in the Roman finds increased duríng and after the Renaissance, but it took a long time until the ruins were identified as the city of Teurnia or Tiburnia known from antique sources. Professional excavations began with the accidental discovery of the cemetery church in 1908. The mosaic of its donor, the praeses or governor Ursus, in the right side-chapel of the three-naved basilica is in near-perfect preservation. In twelve pictures the mosaic shows christological, mythological and biblical symbols as well as the names of one Ursus, the donor, and his spouse, Ursina.

In 1984, the Early-Christian bishop's church was discovered, which has now been roofed over and is open to visitors. The church walls have been preserved up to a height of six feet and show mural paintings. Excavations were also made along the southern side of the church, where a marble tablet and parts of a cross were unearthed. Earlier guesses had been that the bishop's church was beneath today's parish church, but from historic comparisons Franz Glaser, who is in charge of the Teurnia excavations, deducted the actual position along the western city walls. The episcopal church was built at the beginning of the 5th century and a century later, after a destructive fire, was rebuilt in basilica style with three naves and three apses. In analogy to the Hemmaberg situation in Lower (i.e. eastern) Carinthia, here too the bishop's church might have served the Catholic community, whereas Arians used the cemetery church for their services.

In the village centre of St. Peter in Holz there is a recent "Römer-Museum" exhibiting numerous artefacts from the city area of Teurnia. Nearby are the preserved remains of a Roman town villa or villa urbana boasting a simple hypocaust in form of the letter Y. Next to the bishop's church the Hospitium, the bishop's guest house, was found, but for protection purposes it has been covered with soil again. More excavation work is going on. Information on the city's history and the excavation work is provided in display cases all over the area.

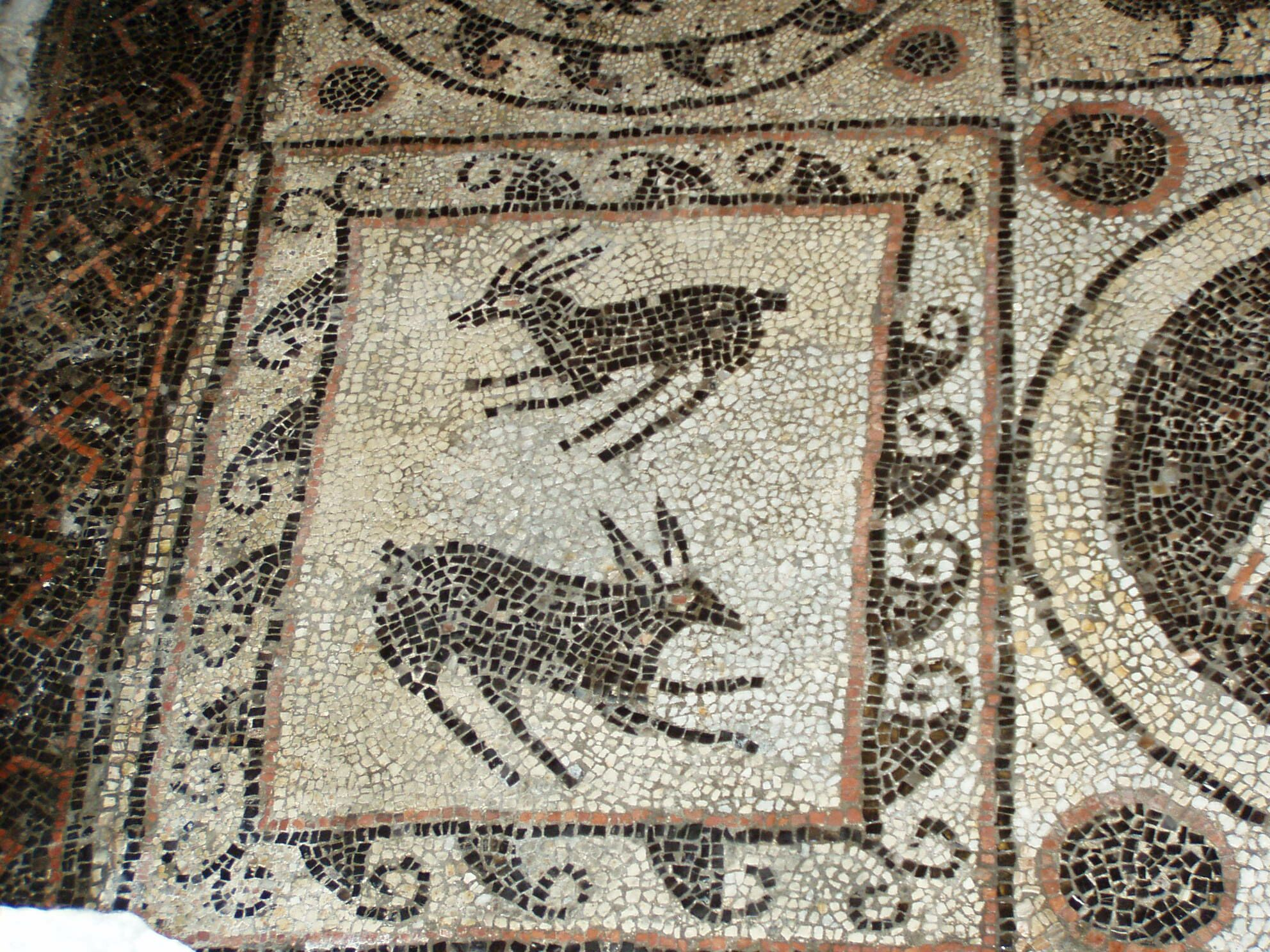
Mosaic in Teurnia.

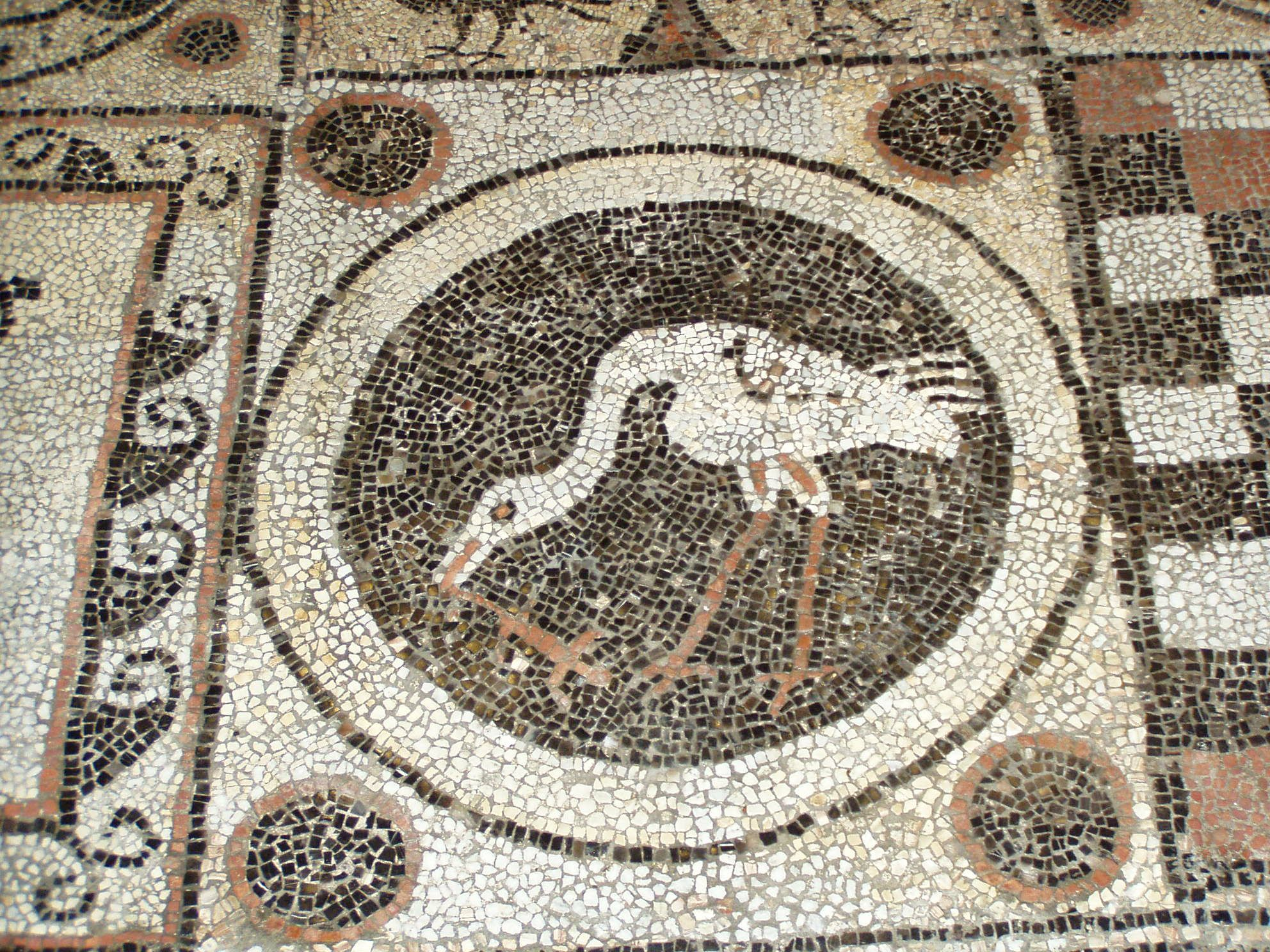
Mosaic in Teurnia.

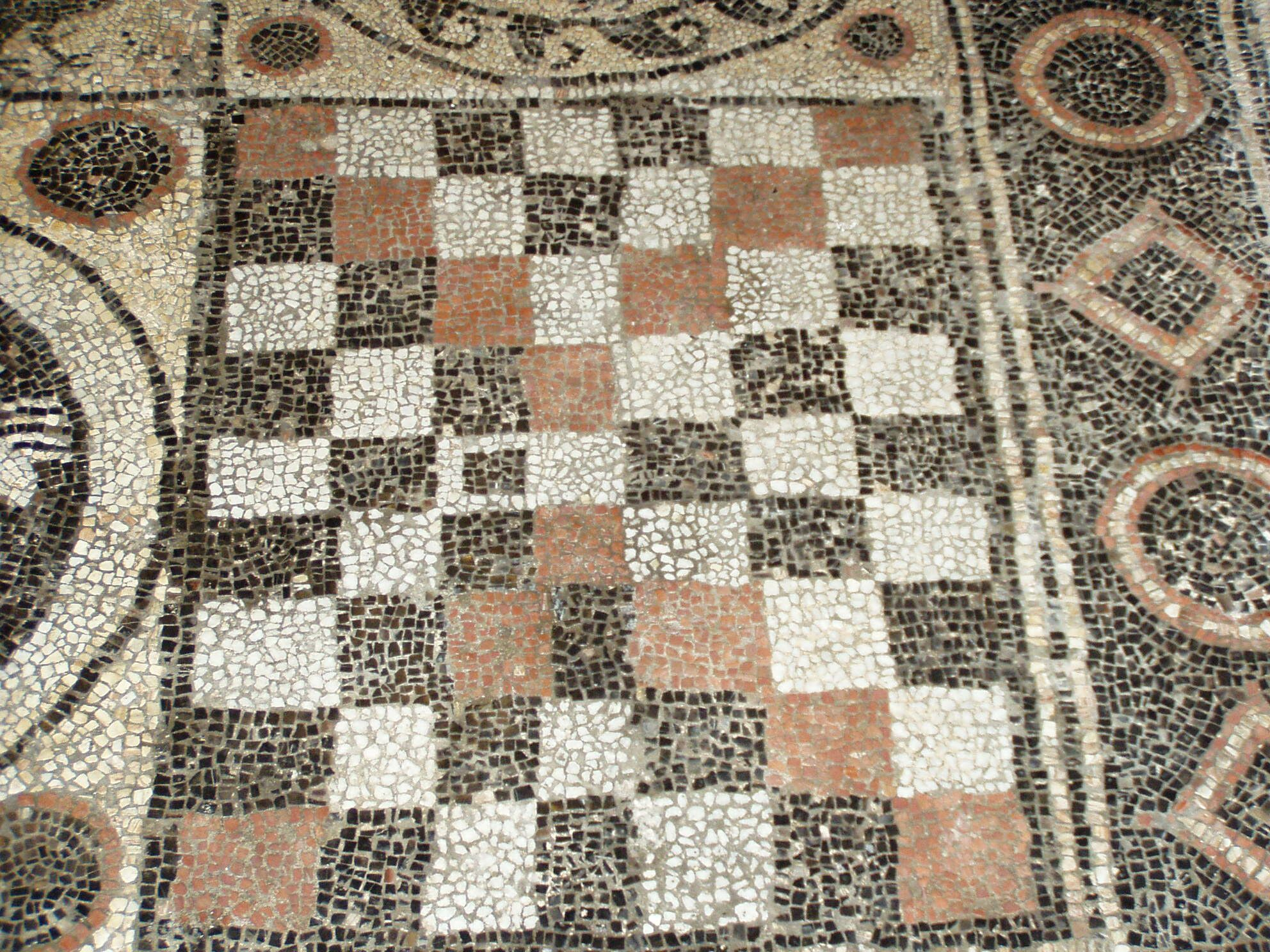
Mosaic in Teurnia.

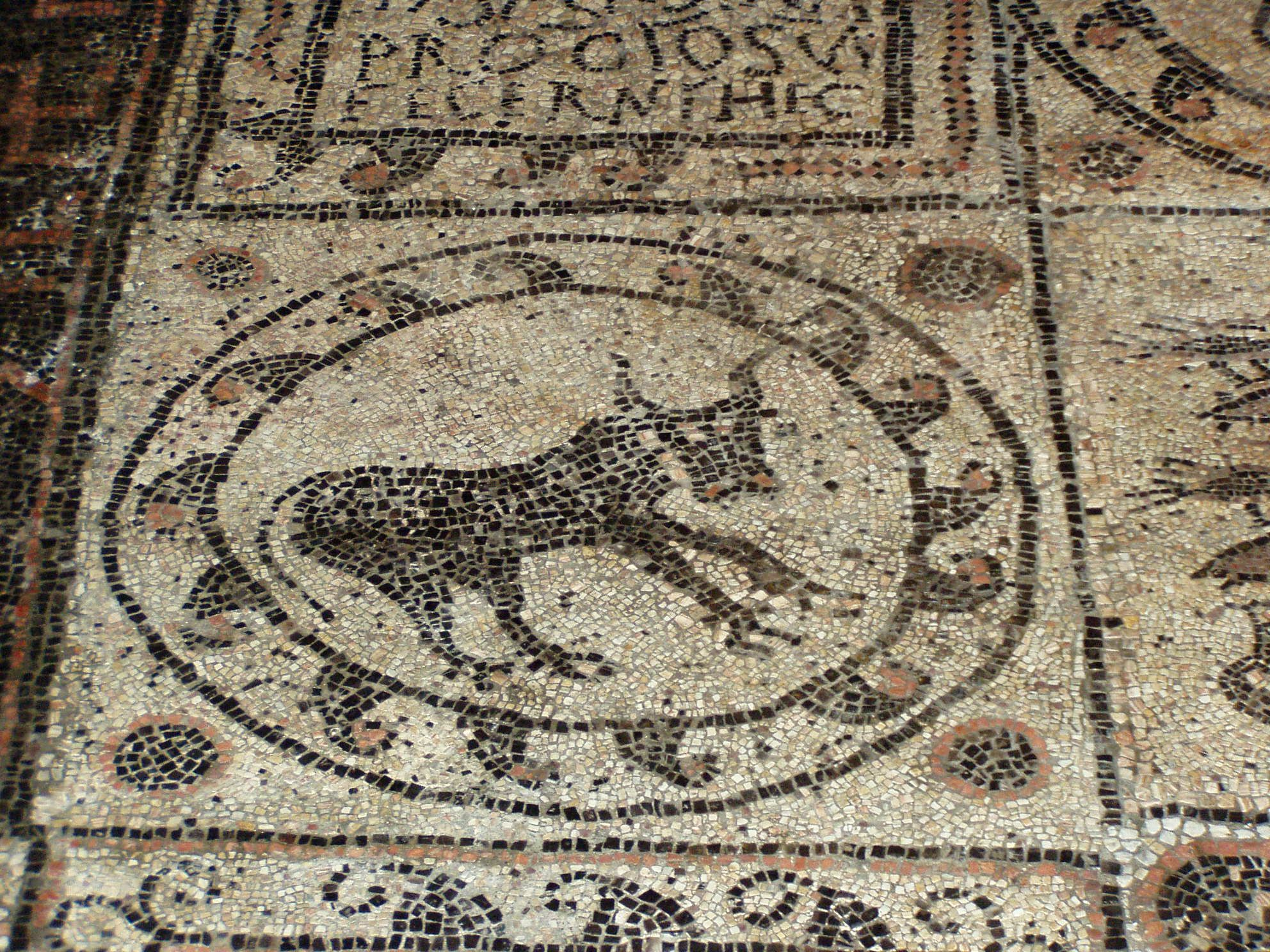
Mosaic in Teurnia.

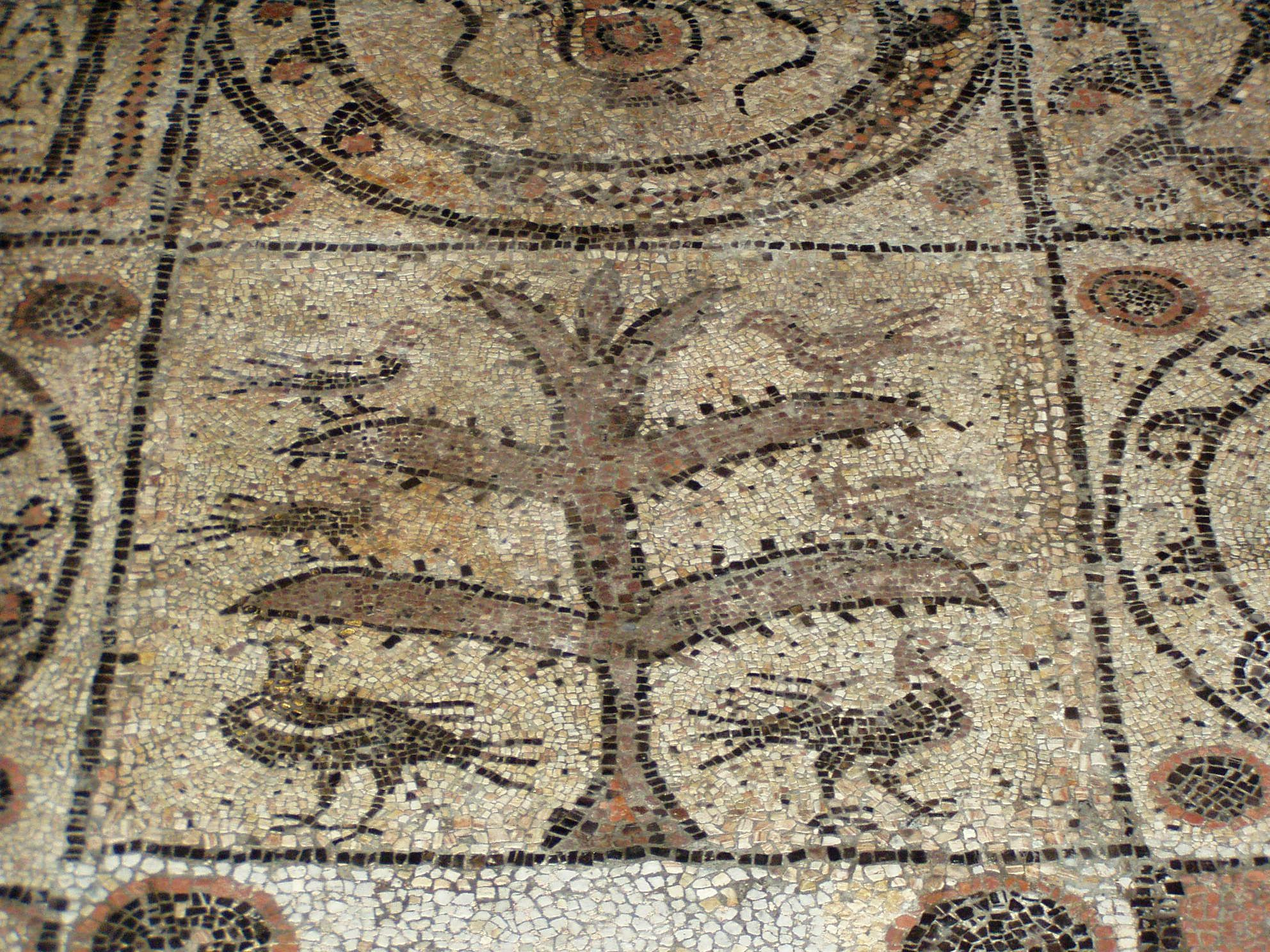
Mosaic in Teurnia.

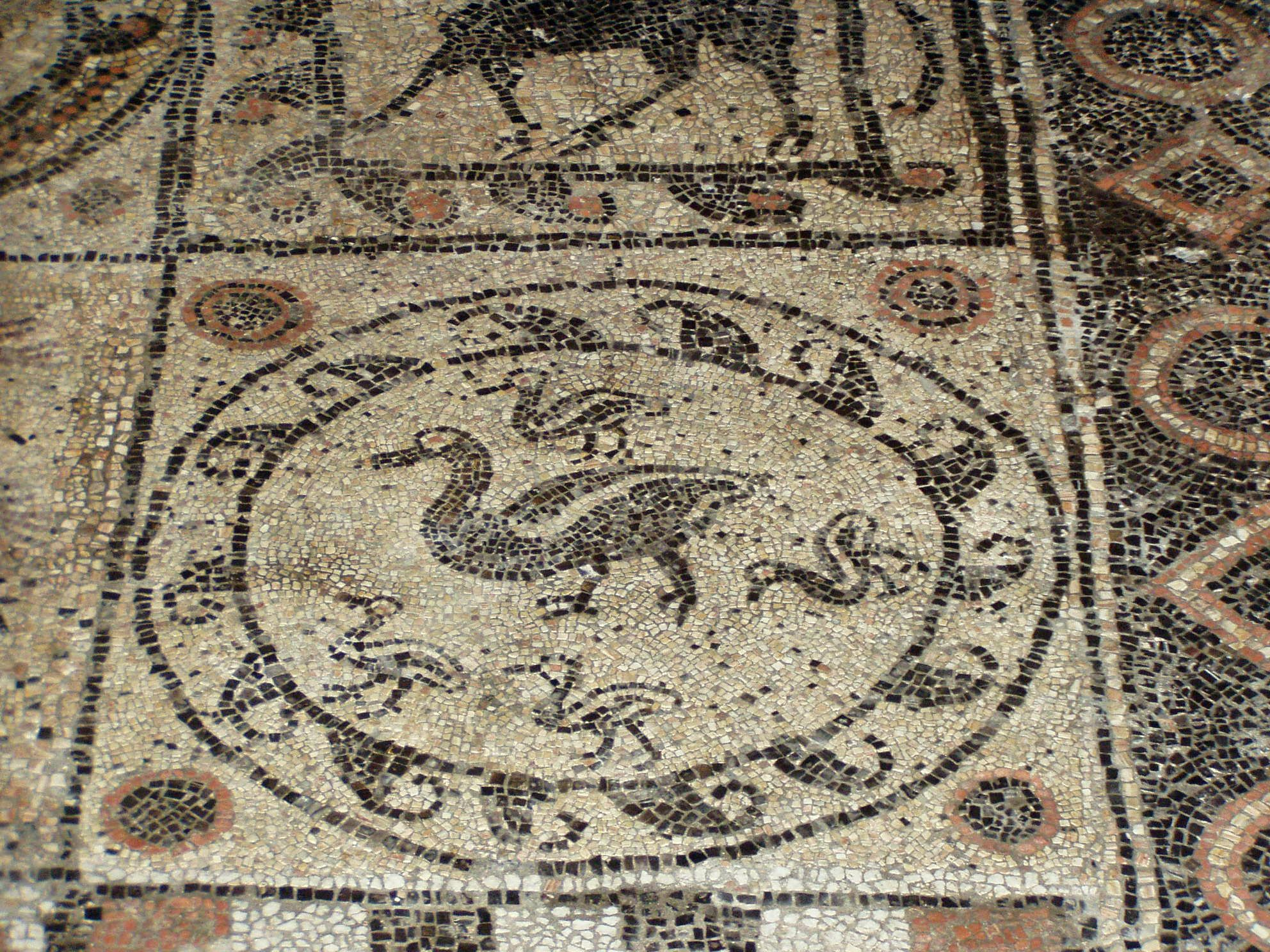
Mosaic in Teurnia.

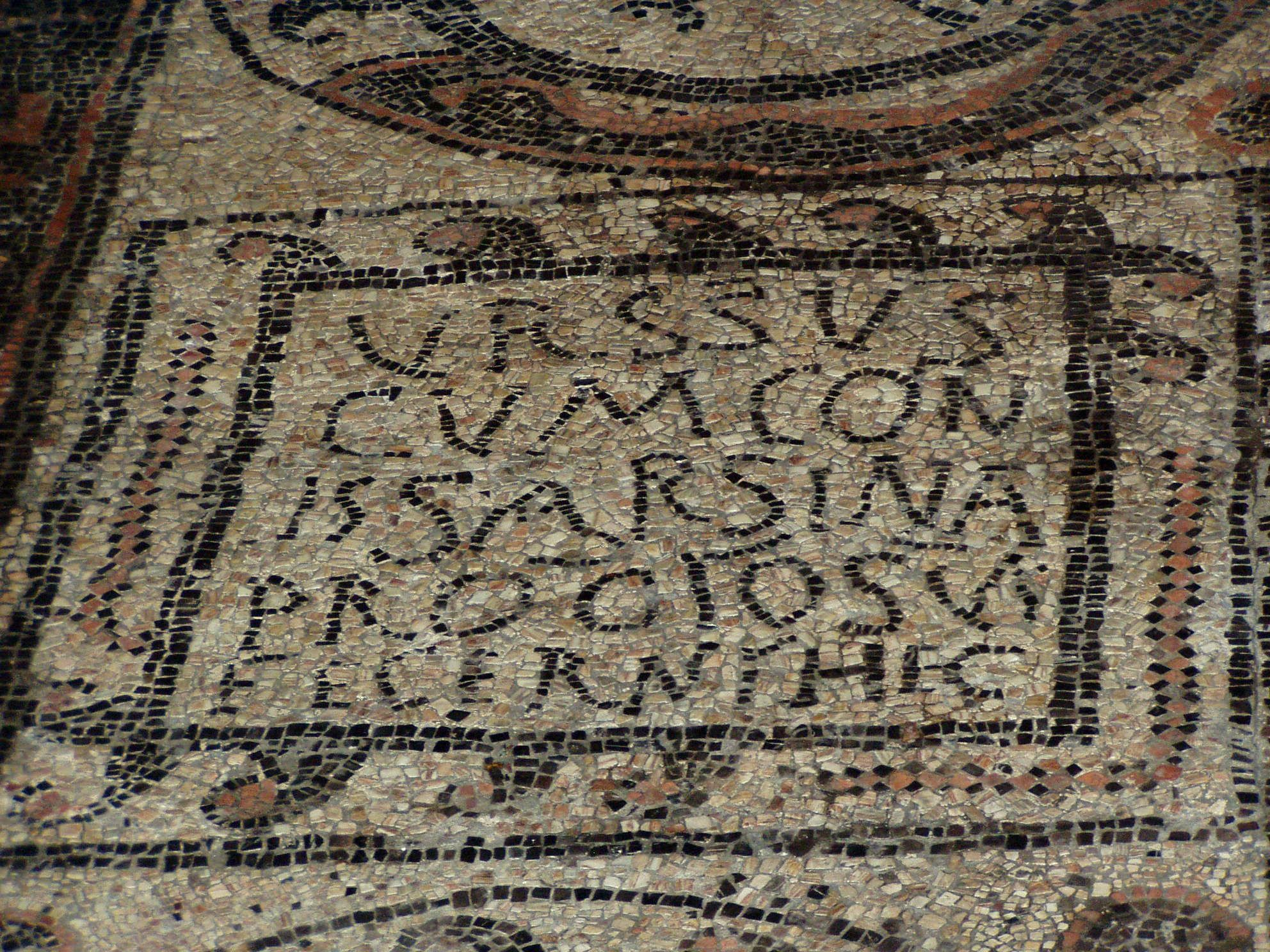
Mosaic in Teurnia.

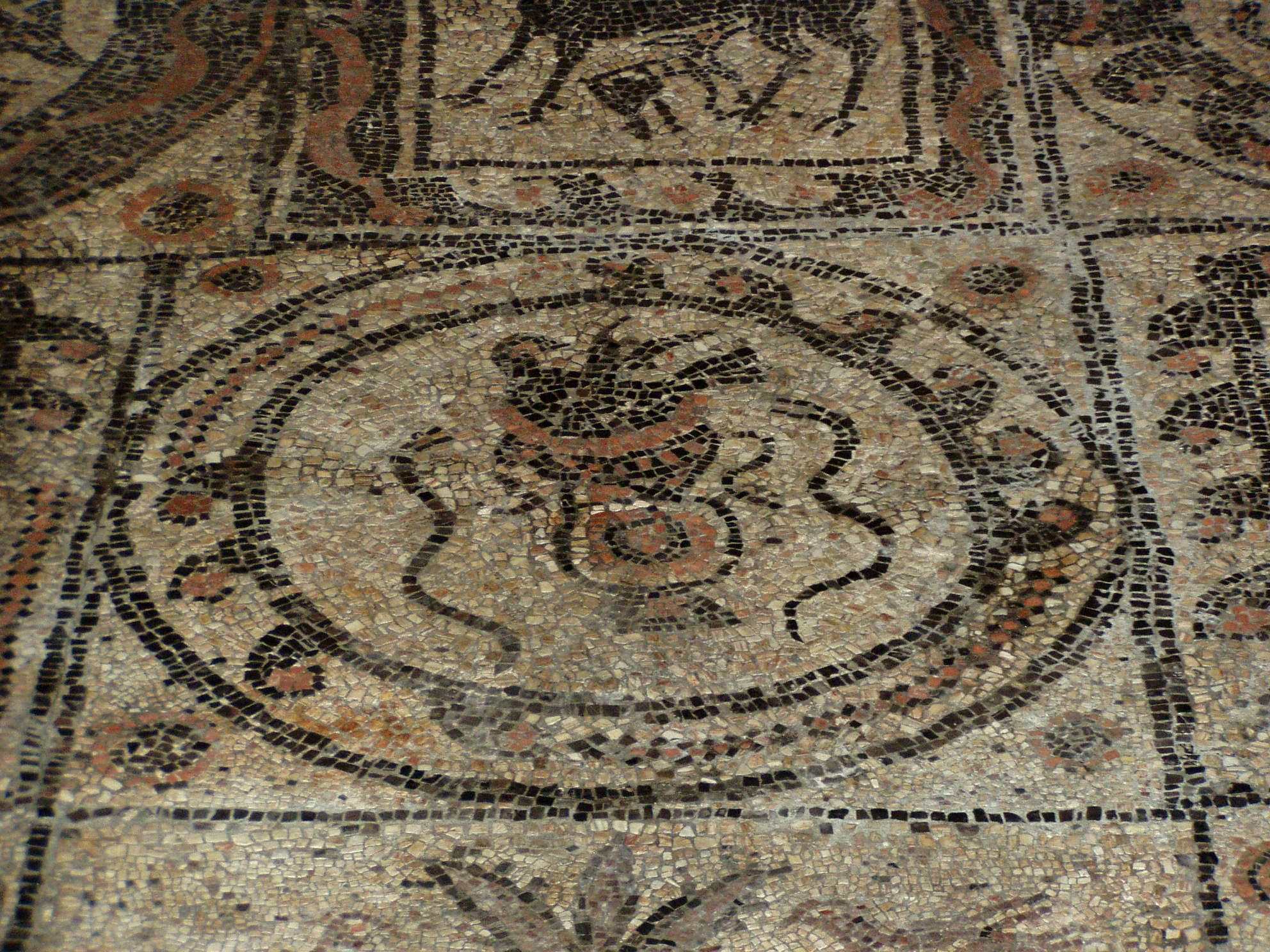
Mosaic in Teurnia.

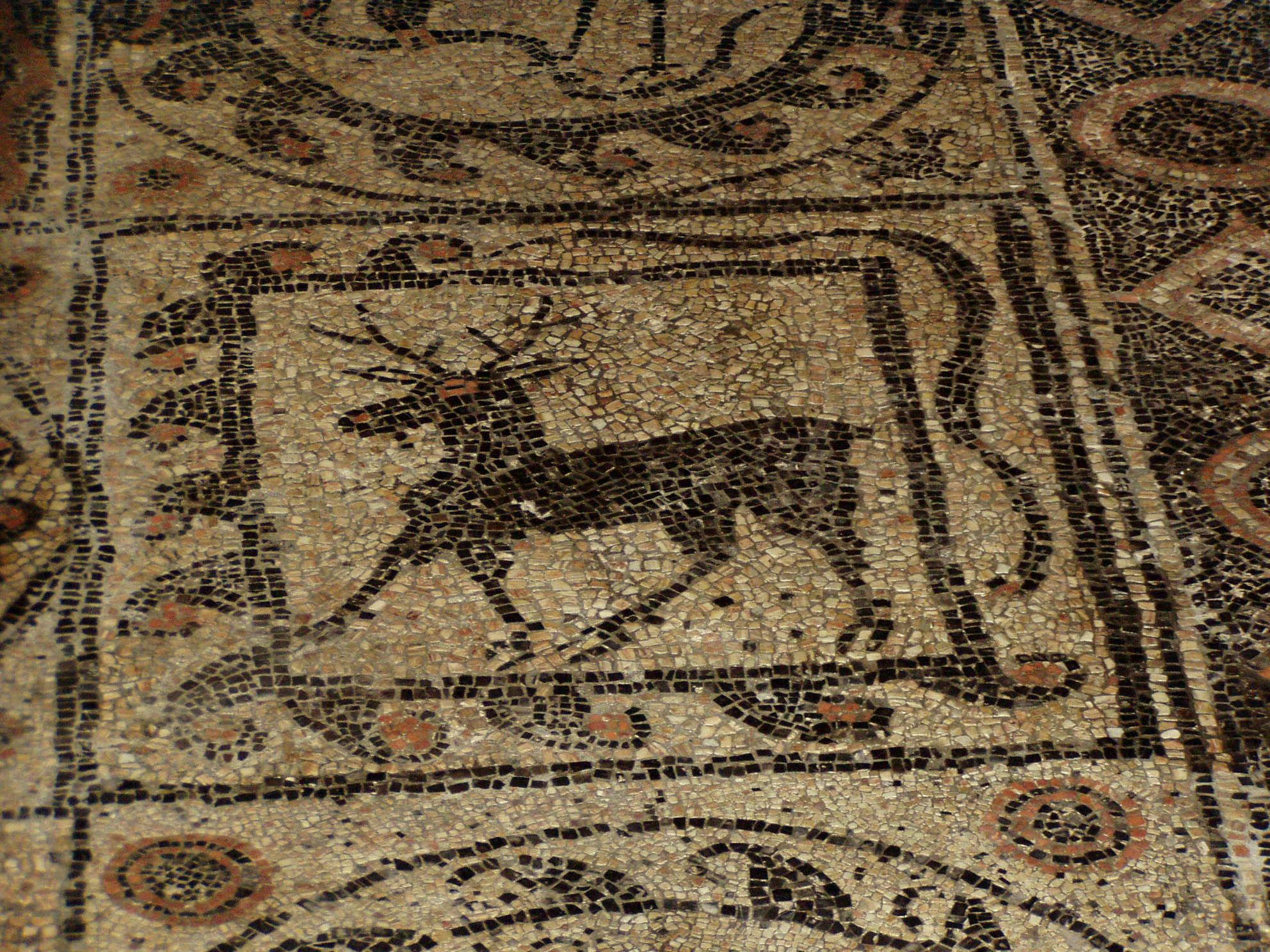
Mosaic in Teurnia.

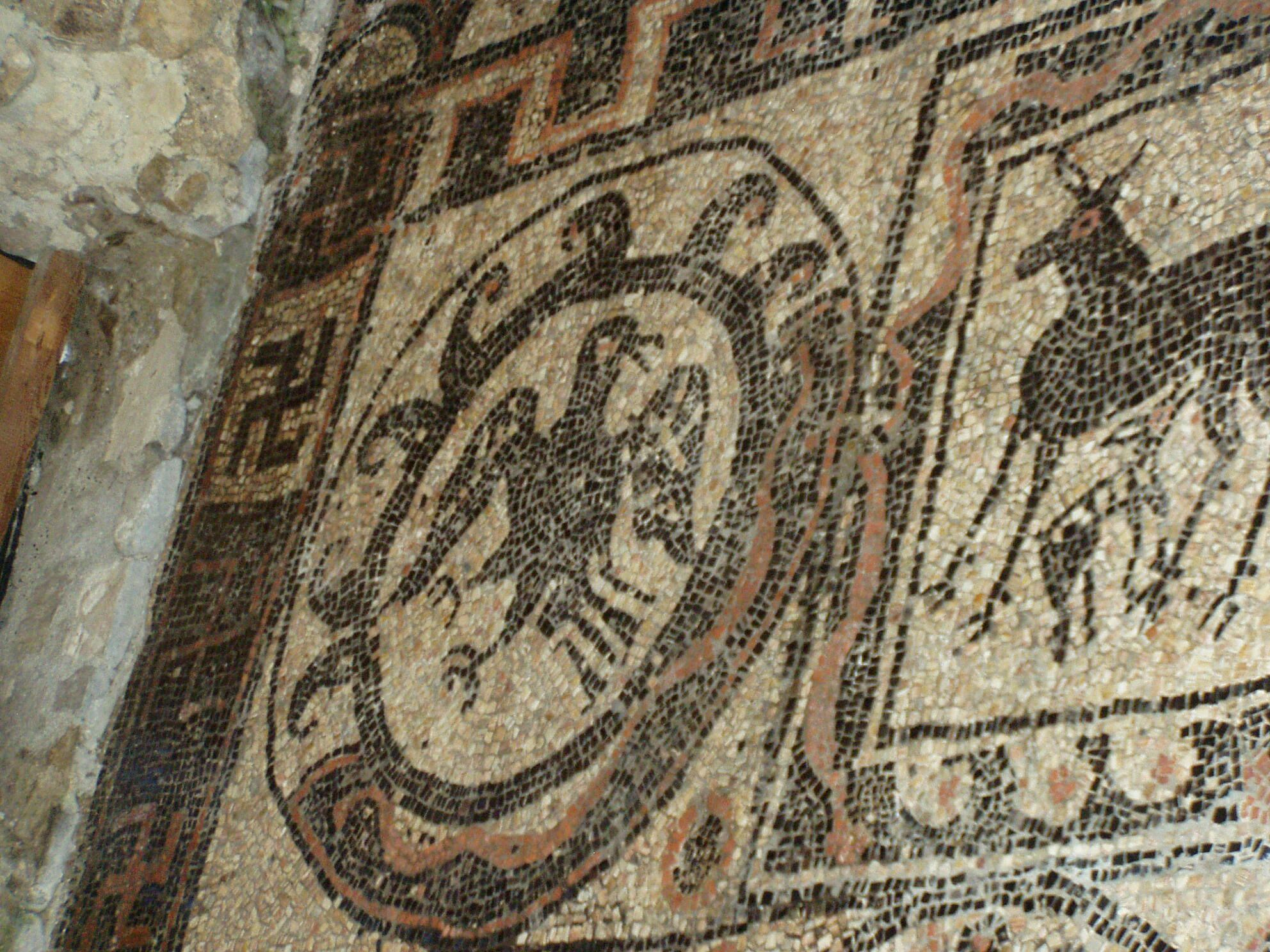
Mosaic in Teurnia.

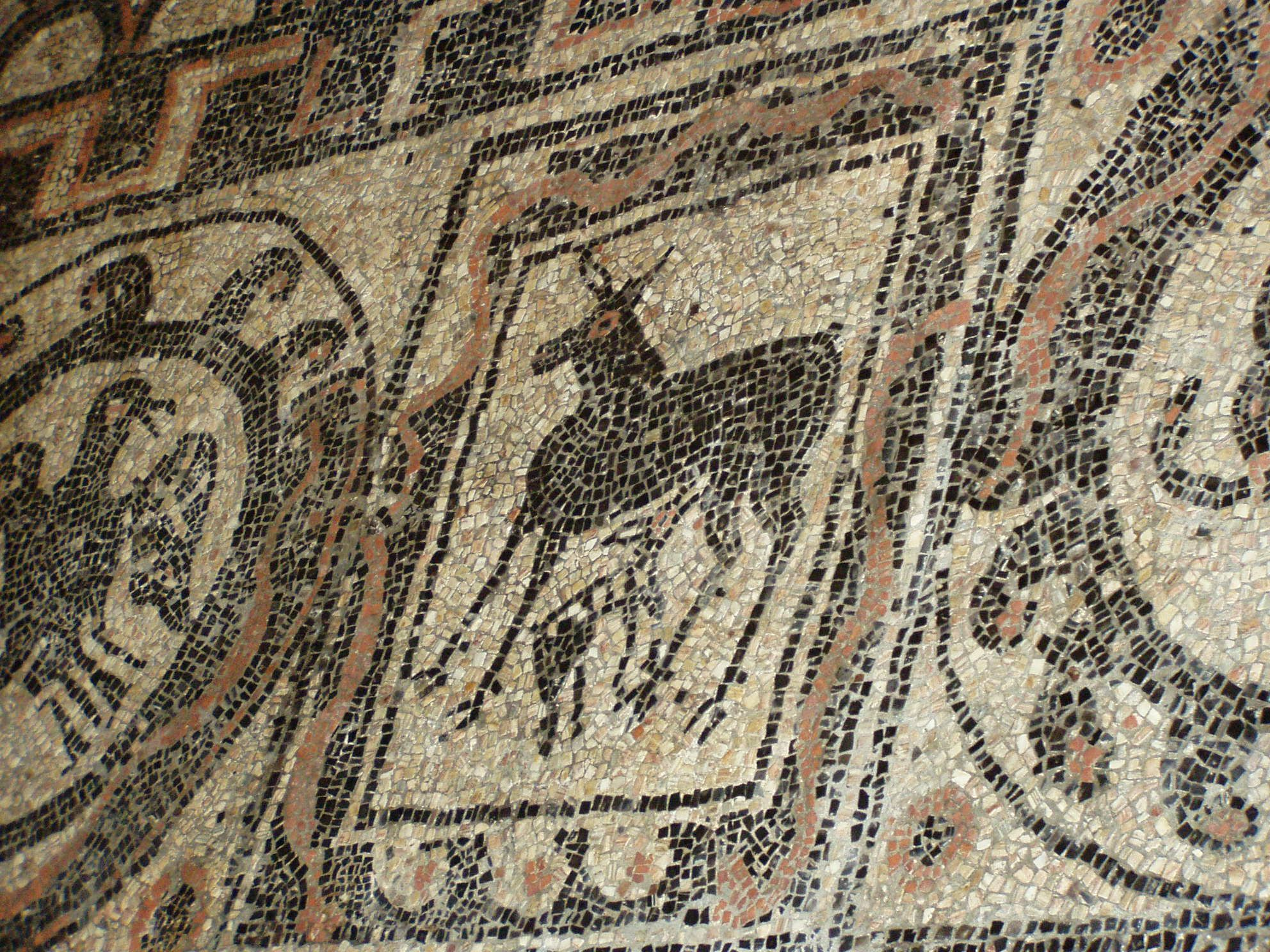
Mosaic in Teurnia.

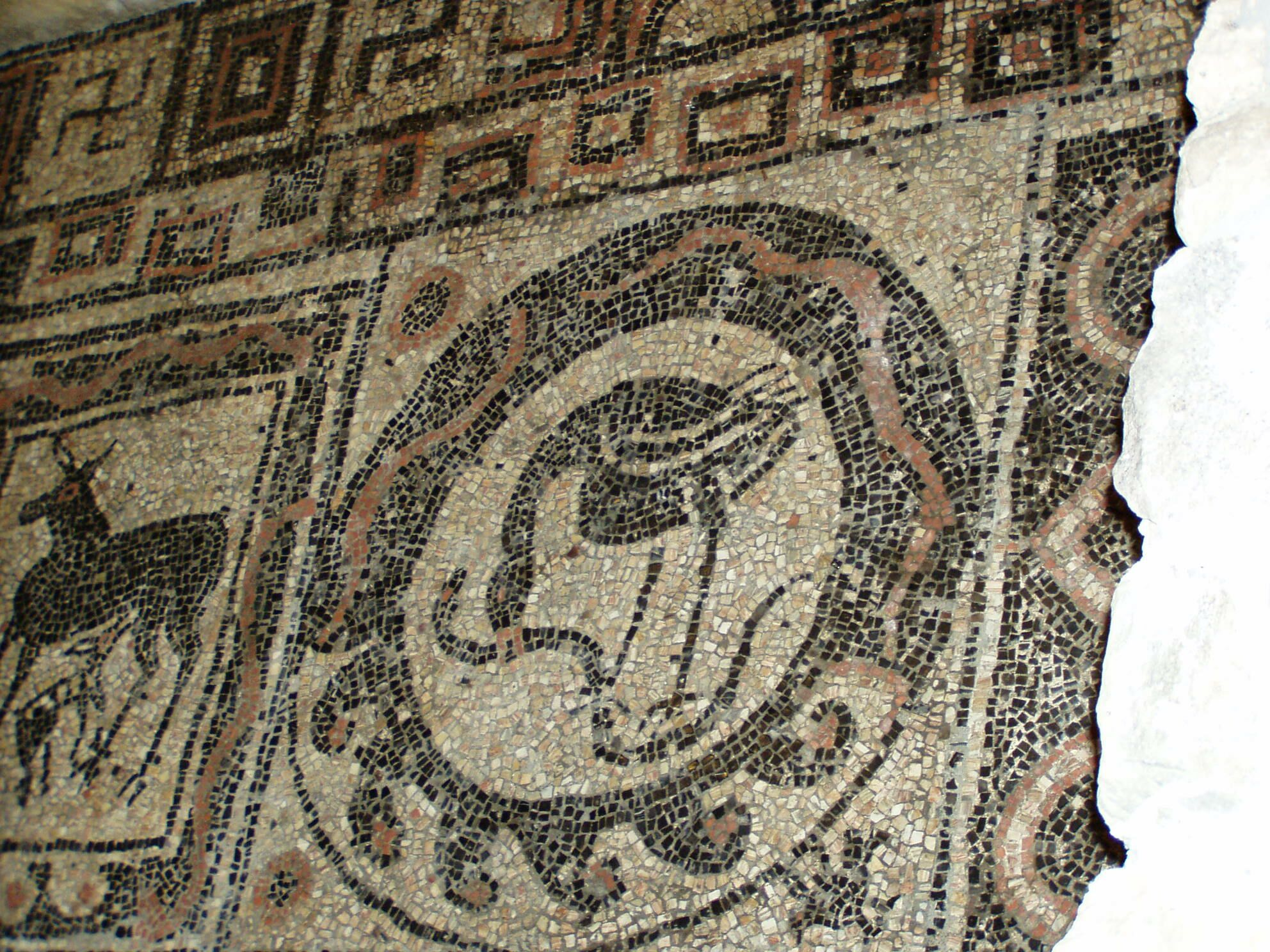
Mosaic in Teurnia.

== Literature ==
- Barley, Maurice Willmore,European towns: their archaeology and early history. Published for the Council for British Archaeology. New York: Academic Press, 1977 ISBN 0-12-078850-0
- Glaser, Franz, Teurnia: Römerstadt und Bischofssitz Klagenfurt: Verlag des Geschichtsvereins 1992 (German)
- Glaser, Franz, Frühchristliche Denkmäler in Kärnten, Klagenfurt: Verlag des Geschichtsvereins 1996 (German)
- Glaser, Franz, Römermuseum Teurnia - Texte und Zeichnungen, Klagenfurt: Verlag des Geschichtsvereins 2002 (German)
- Gugl, Christian, Archäologische Forschungen in Teurnia: die Ausgrabungen in den Wohnterrassen 1971-1978 : die latènezeitlichen Funde vom Holzer Berg, Vienna: Österreichisches Archäologisches Institut, 2000(German)
- Gugl, Christian, Das Umland Teurnias vom 2. Jahrhundert v. Chr. bis ins 1. Jahrhundert n.Chr. Eine Studie zur Siedlungskontinuität von der Latène- zur Römerzeit im oberen Drautal.In: Arheološki Vestnik (ACTA ARCHAEOLOGICA) 52 (2001) Ljubljana: Slovenska akademija 2001, pp. 303–349 ISSN 0570-8966 English Abstract
- Michael Doneus,Precision mapping and interpretation of oblique aerial photographs (= Archaeological Prospection Vol.8, Issue 1) Hoboken NJ: John Wiley & Sons, 2001 pp. 13 – 27,
- Kos, Marjeta Šašel, Pre-Roman divinities of the eastern Alps and Adriatic, Ljubljana: Narodni muzej Slovenije, 1999, ISBN 961-6169-11-4
