= Aguntum =

Roman site in East Tyrol, Austria

Coordinates: 46°49′38″N 12°49′23″E

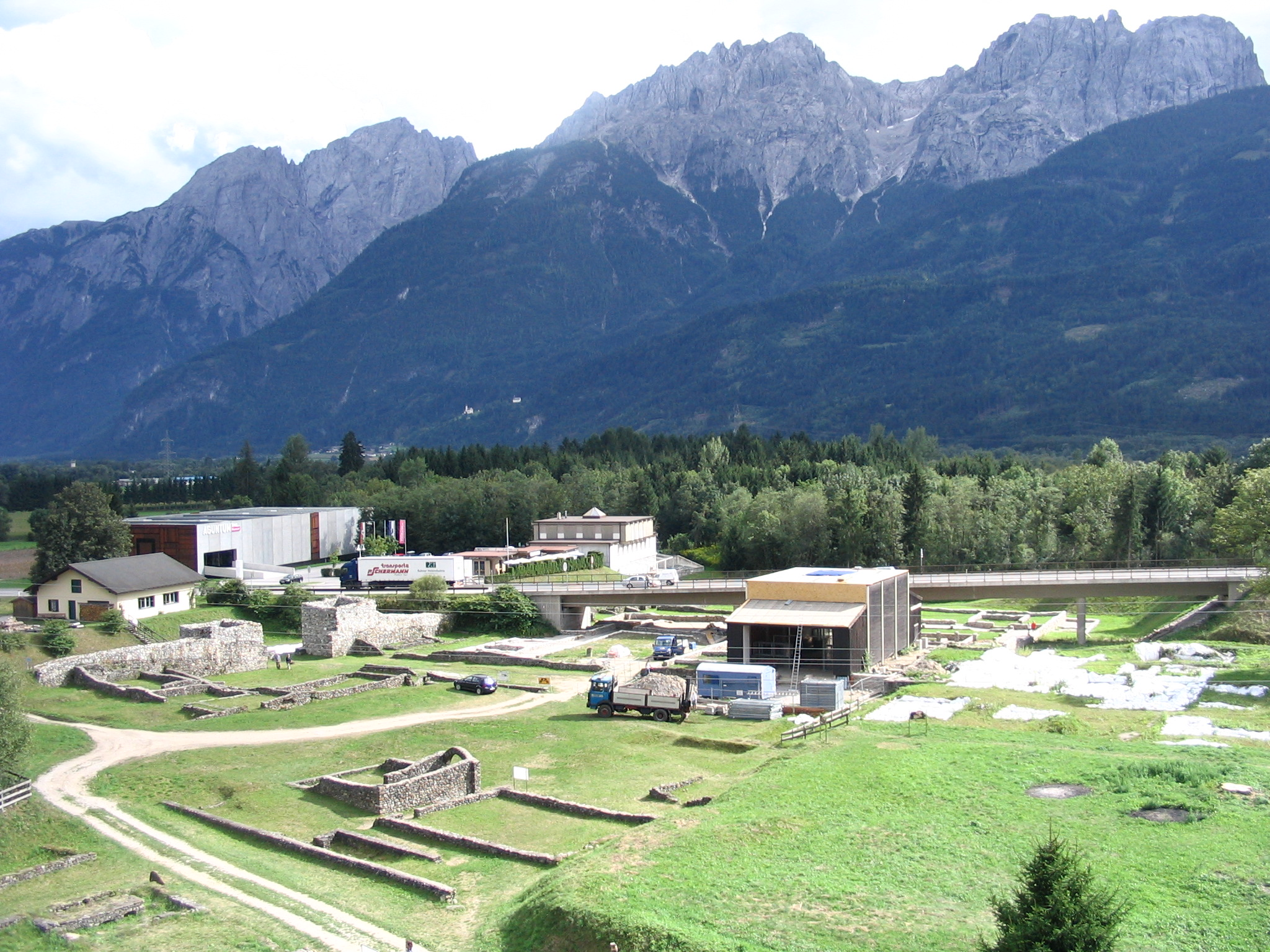
Ruins of the Roman baths at Aguntum

The ruins of Aguntum are an ancient Roman site in East Tirol, Austria, located approximately four kilometres (2.5 mi) east of Lienz in the Drau valley. The city appears to have been built to exploit the local sources of iron, copper, zinc and gold. During the early Christian era, the city was the site of a bishopric, which, having ceased to be a residential diocese, is today listed by the Catholic Church as a titular see.

== History ==
This area of East Tyrol was the homeland of the Laianci tribe and hilltop settlements, so far hardly investigated, crown many of the hills in the area. A trading vicus developed here at an important intersection in the Drau Valley, with one important road leading to the gold deposits in the Hohe Tauern.

The oldest Roman remains are a two-roomed wooden structure discovered beneath the bath house and dated to the mid-first century BC. According to Pliny the Elder, the emperor Claudius granted Aguntum the status of municipium, a status which is attested by inscriptions, including funerary inscriptions, which refer to cultores Genii municipii Agunti. The official name was Municipium Claudium Aguntum. There does not appear to have been a military camp in this area.

Aguntum was a mining and trading centre which exploited local sources of iron, copper, zinc, and gold. Craftsmen in the town processed the metals to produce a range of goods which were then transported along the Roman roads. Other exports included wood, milk products (cheese) and mountain crystals from the Tauern range.

The discovery of a layer of ash, as well as the remains of a man and a child in the bath house, points to the sack of Aguntum by the invading barbarians under Radagaisus and Alaric. The city's decline was marked when the bishopric was transferred to nearby Lavant, a few miles to the south. A second sack by Attila and his Huns is attested by a coin dated to AD 452 found in a higher layer of ash. When the Western Roman Empire collapsed, Aguntum passed under the control of the Ostrogoths and was fought over by Franks, Byzantines and Bavarians. Paul the Deacon writes of a major battle fought in 610 between Garibald II of Bavaria and the Avars, in which Garibald was completely defeated. Aguntum was destroyed and even Lavant suffered a major fire. There were no further bishops ordained in the area and the surviving Roman population took refuge in hilltop fortresses while the barbarians settled in the fertile valley.

Repeatedly flooded by the Debantbach, the ruins of Aguntum remained visible until the 16th century, for in 1599 Veit Netlich, a lawyer, mentioned gravestones with "unknown writing" and reported that "according to a myth, here was a heathen city". The historian Theodor Mommsen proposed that the ruins were those of Aguntum, a theory which was confirmed in 1882 when a marble slab inscribed with the name was discovered.

== Site description ==
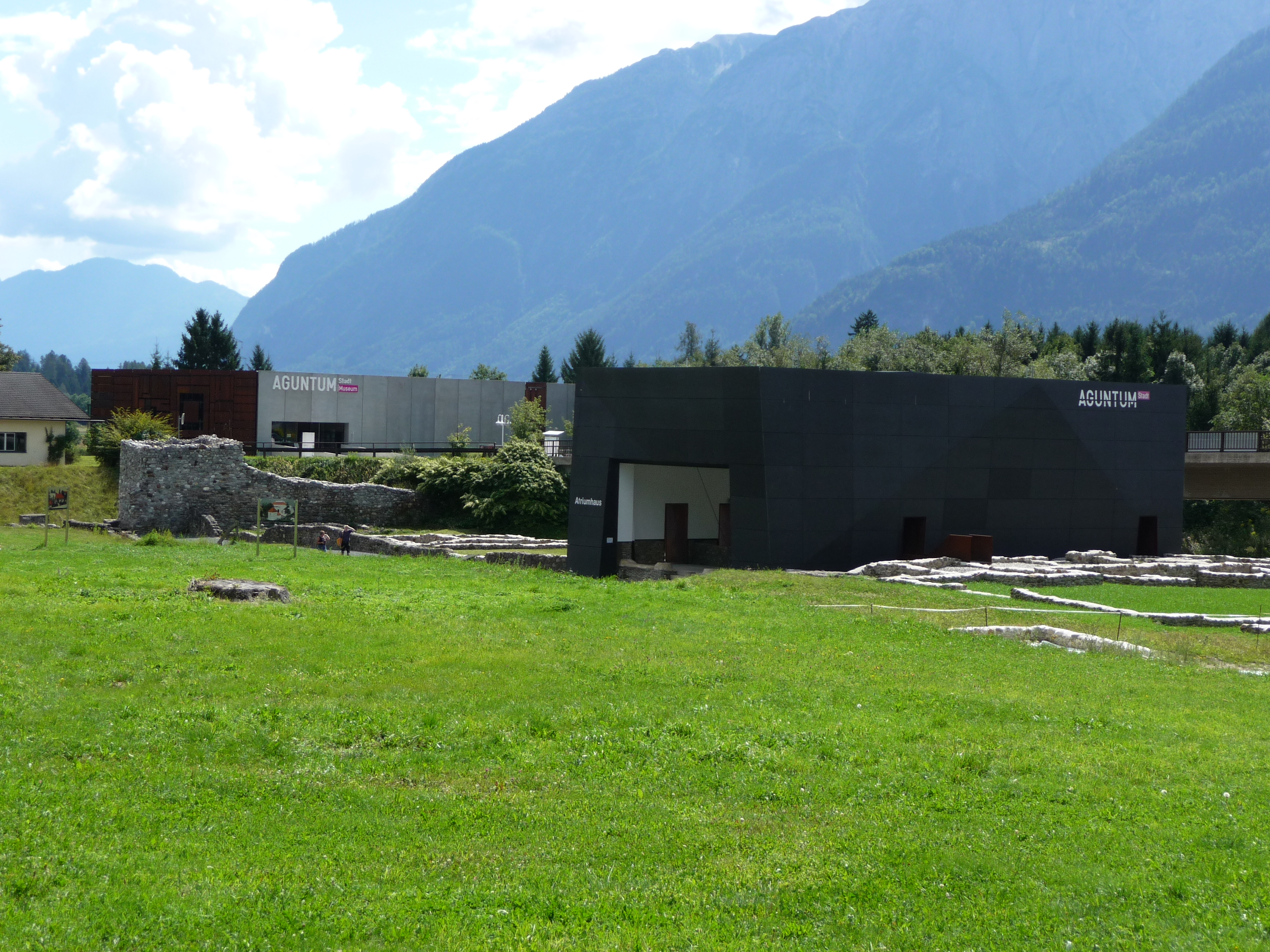
Aguntum Museum

A small museum contains objects discovered during the excavations. These include painted tombstones, pottery masks, bronze objects, coins and interpretive displays. The management of the remains is carried out with bioversity in mind.

A large modern building covers the remains of the Atrium House, an elegant villa with a fountain and marble table in the atrium. The villa covered an area of 2,508 square metres (3,000 sq yd) and is the largest residential building so far discovered in Aguntum.

To the right (east) on leaving the Atrium House are the city gates, which still stand 3–4.5 metres (9.8–14.8 ft) high. The walls, which were 2 metres (8 ft) thick, were constructed of a double wall of cut stone infilled with earth and rubble, have been excavated for 30 metres (98 ft) to the north and 75 metres (246 ft) to the south, but the circuit of the walls has not been traced beyond this. Presumably, the nearby Debantbach has thoroughly covered the site with debris brought down from the mountains.

The date of the wall's construction is uncertain. Materials incorporated in the fill point to the emperor Hadrian, but stylistic grounds favour a 3rd-century AD date. An additional question surrounds the purpose of the wall. The Marcomanni Wars around 170 AD have been suggested as the reason, as has the invasion by the Alemanni in the 3rd century AD, but others have suggested that the walls were built primarily to defend the city against flooding or landslides - a not impossible reason if the industry carried on in the town led to extensive deforestation of the surrounding hills. A final suggestion is that the wall and gate were originally built for show but hastily extended and improved to withstand the Alemanni.

An extensive artisans' quarter has been uncovered, with workshops for various industries. Many of the buildings have their corners protected by large boulders, presumably against the possibility of damage from wheeled vehicles passing through the narrow streets. There is a very large bath house – an indication of the size of the Roman city – with several marble pools separated from the walls of the rooms in which they stand, to allow hot air to circulate under and around them. This is the largest Roman bath complex so far discovered in Austria and was first constructed during the reign of Tiberius but was destroyed in the late first century AD by a fire. It was reconstructed in a more "modern" style and further extended in the 2nd and 3rd centuries AD.

A forum has been uncovered, to one side of which stands a circular building, possibly part of the so-called "Ostentatious Building". The building itself is square, but an interior wall marks out a large circle which is floored with multi-coloured marble slabs. The perimeter of the circle is divided into a number of chambers. Across the middle of the floor – and probably a later insertion as the building fell into disuse - is a narrow channel whose purpose is not clearly understood.

== Ecclesiastical history ==
A Catholic bishopric was founded around 500 AD, as a suffragan of the Metropolitan Roman Catholic Archdiocese of Aquileia, which meanwhile became a princely patriarchate. It was suppressed around 600.

It was nominally revived as a titular see of the (lowest) episcopal rank in 1968, which so far had six successive incumbents:

- Francis Joseph Gossman (1968.07.15 – 1975.04.08)
- Josef Plöger (1975.05.09 – 2005.04.22)
- Romuald Kamiński (2005.06.08 – 2017.09.14), Appointed Coadjutor Bishop of Warszawa-Praga
- Paulo Celso Dias do Nascimento (2017.10.27 – 2023.04.19), Appointed Bishop of Itaguaí
- Fabián Alberto Belay (2023.05.31 – 2023.07.04), Resigned as Auxiliary Bishop of Rosario (Note: Fr Fabián Alberto Belay was appointed Auxiliary Bishop of Rosario but declined the appointment to focus on his vocation as a priest instead.)
- Nelson Po (2026.02.02 – Present)
