= Saevates =

Ancient alpine tribe

The Saevates were an ancient tribe living in the Alpine province of Noricum in Roman times, in the Puster Valley. Together with the Laianci, they are recorded under the joint name Civitas Saevatum et Laiancorum.

== Name ==
The name Saevates is attested in two ancient forms: Seoúakes (Σεούακες) in Ptolemy's Geography (2, 13, 2) and civitas Saevatum et Laiancorum on the Iulium Carnicum tablet (CIL 5, 1838). These two forms are considered incompatible with one another. They also appear in an inscription from Magdalensberg (Carinthia) honouring members of the family of the emperor Augustus, dedicated by the Noric peoples between 10 and 9 BC. G. R. Isaac analyses the Ptolemaic form as deriving from *seuo-ak-, but offers no further elucidation. The etymology therefore remains obscure.

== Territory ==
The original settlement area of the Saevates was located in the Puster Valley, extending into the Aurina Valley and Val Badia. The Civitas Saevatum et Laiancorum as a whole encompassed the Drava valley as far as Oberdrauburg, the valley floor around Lienz, the Puster Valley, and its lateral valleys up to the heights above the Rienza and Isarco rivers.

== History ==
Before the Roman annexation of Noricum, traders and their descendants from northern Italy may already have settled in trading posts (emporia) in the territory of the Laianci and the Saevates. The Norican kingdom (regnum Noricum) of the 1st century BC is not thought to have extended over their territory.

The Saevates, whom Karl Strobel groups with the Laianci as belonging culturally to the non-Celtic Fritzens-Sanzeno culture of the central Alps, are thought to have been subjugated in 16 BC during the bellum Noricum under Silius Nerva, proconsul of Illyricum; like the Laianci, they do not appear on the Tropaeum Alpium.

In 14/13 BC the region was organised into eight territorially and fiscally defined civitates, among them the Saevates and the Laianci as separate units, whose newly established provincial council (concilium provinciae) set up dedicatory inscriptions to Augustus and the imperial house at the Magdalensberg. The Saevates possessed no proto-urban central place, and their late La Tène hillforts had been cleared by the Romans. By the time of the annexation, the joint territory was held to contain enough inhabitants of sufficient Romanisation and economic standing, possessing at least Italic rights, for Aguntum to draw its town council and magistrates.

The Roman settlement archaeologically documented near S. Lorenzo, identified as Sebatum in the Antonine Itinerary, served as the principal settlement area of the Saevates. Sebatum developed only from the late Augustan period; equipped with a macellum and public baths, it became the central settlement of the region, probably a vicus and possibly the seat of a pagus.

Under Claudius (41–54 AD), Aguntum was raised to a municipium of Latin right, holding the rank and title of municipium Claudium. Banzi and colleagues describe the Saevates and Laianci as having been associated into a single administrative unit shortly after the Roman takeover, around 15 BC, whereas Strobel holds that the two peoples were combined only under Claudius, when both were united into the new Municipium Claudium Aguntum. Following the foundation of the city, the civitas Saevatum et Laiancorum ceased to exist as an autonomous administrative entity, and the entire settlement territory of both tribes was assigned to the new municipium. The territory of the Saevates was thus administratively subordinated to Aguntum, though Sebatum is not considered to have been reduced to the status of a mere road station (mansio).
