= Laianci =

Ancient alpine tribe

The Laianci were an ancient tribe living in the Alpine province of Noricum in Roman times, in the area of present-day Lienz in East Tyrol. Together with the Saevates, they are recorded under the joint name Civitas Saevatum et Laiancorum.

== Name ==
The genitive plural Laiancorum is attested in the formula civitas Saevatum et Laiancorum on the Iulium Carnicum tablet (CIL 5, 1838), an honorific inscription for Gaius Baebius Atticus, and on an inscription from Magdalensberg (Carinthia) honouring members of the family of the emperor Augustus, dedicated by the Noric peoples between 10 and 9 BC.

== Territory ==
The territory of the Laianci occupied the upper Drava valley and extended into the Isel valley, the Villgraten valley, and the Lesach and Gail valleys. Their region of origin, whose name has not been transmitted, is thought to have corresponded to the slopes above the valley floor of Lienz, overlooking the later city of Aguntum.

The Civitas Saevatum et Laiancorum as a whole encompassed the Drava valley as far as Oberdrauburg, the valley floor around Lienz, the Puster Valley, and its lateral valleys up to the heights above the Rienza and Isarco rivers. The road running from the Plöcken Pass via Oberdrauburg to Aguntum and onward towards the Brenner is assigned to the territory of the Laianci, with Aguntum serving as its caput viae.

== History ==
Before the Roman annexation of Noricum, traders from northern Italy may already have settled in trading posts (emporia) in the territory of the Laianci and the Saevates. The Norican kingdom (regnum Noricum) of the 1st century BC is not thought to have extended over their territory.

The Laianci, whom Karl Strobel groups with the Saevates as belonging culturally to the non-Celtic Fritzens-Sanzeno culture of the central Alps, are thought to have been subjugated in 16 BC during the bellum Noricum conducted by Silius Nerva, proconsul of Illyricum. As they do not appear on the Tropaeum Alpium, their subjugation is attributed to that campaign rather than to the Alpine war of 15 BC. Recent excavations have revealed evidence of fighting at the fortified tribal sanctuary of the Laianci on the Klosterfrauenbichl above Lienz.

In 14/13 BC the Roman administration organised the region into eight civitates, among them the Laianci and the Saevates as separate units. These civitates established a provincial council (concilium provinciae), whose dedicatory inscriptions to Augustus and the imperial house were set up at the Magdalensberg. Like the other peoples of the group, the Laianci possessed no proto-urban central place, and their late La Tène hillforts had been cleared by the Romans.

By the time of the annexation, the joint territory was held to contain enough inhabitants of sufficient Romanisation and economic standing, possessing at least Italic rights, for Aguntum to draw its town council and magistrates. Under the emperor Claudius (41–54 AD), Aguntum (Dölsach, near Lienz), a new foundation on a previously unbuilt site within the territory of the Laianci, was raised to a municipium of Latin right. Banzi describes the two peoples as having been associated into a single administrative unit shortly after the Roman takeover, around 15 BC, whereas Strobel holds that the Laianci and the Saevates were combined only under Claudius, when both were united into the new Municipium Claudium Aguntum. Following the foundation of the city, the civitas Saevatum et Laiancorum ceased to exist as an autonomous administrative entity, and the entire settlement territory of both tribes was assigned to the new municipium.
