= Julius Caesar's invasions of Britain =

Military campaigns in 55 and 54 BC

- Part of the Gallic Wars
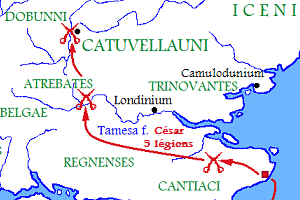
- Roman invasion of Britain 54 BC
Date	55 and 54 BC
Location	Kent, the Thames, Essex and Hertfordshire
Result	see Aftermath
Territorial changes	None

Belligerents
Roman Republic	Celtic Britons

Commanders and leaders
Julius Caesar	Cassivellaunus

Strength
55 BC; 7,000–10,000 legionaries plus cavalry and auxiliaries 100 transport ships 54 BC; 17,500–25,000 legionaries 2,000 cavalry 600 transports 28 warships	Unknown

In the course of his Gallic Wars, Julius Caesar invaded Britain twice: in 55 and 54 BC. On the first occasion, Caesar took with him only two legions, and achieved little beyond a landing on the coast of Kent. The second invasion was more substantial, consisting of 800 ships, five legions and 2,000 cavalry. The Celtic Britons did not initially contest Caesar's landing, waiting instead until he began to move inland. Caesar eventually penetrated into Middlesex and crossed the Thames, forcing the British warlord Cassivellaunus to pay tribute to Rome and setting up Mandubracius of the Trinovantes as a client king. The Romans then returned to Gaul without conquering any territory.

Caesar included accounts of both invasions in his Commentarii de Bello Gallico, which contains the earliest surviving significant eyewitness descriptions of the island's people, culture and geography. This is effectively the start of the written history, or at least the protohistory, of Great Britain.

== Britain before Caesar ==
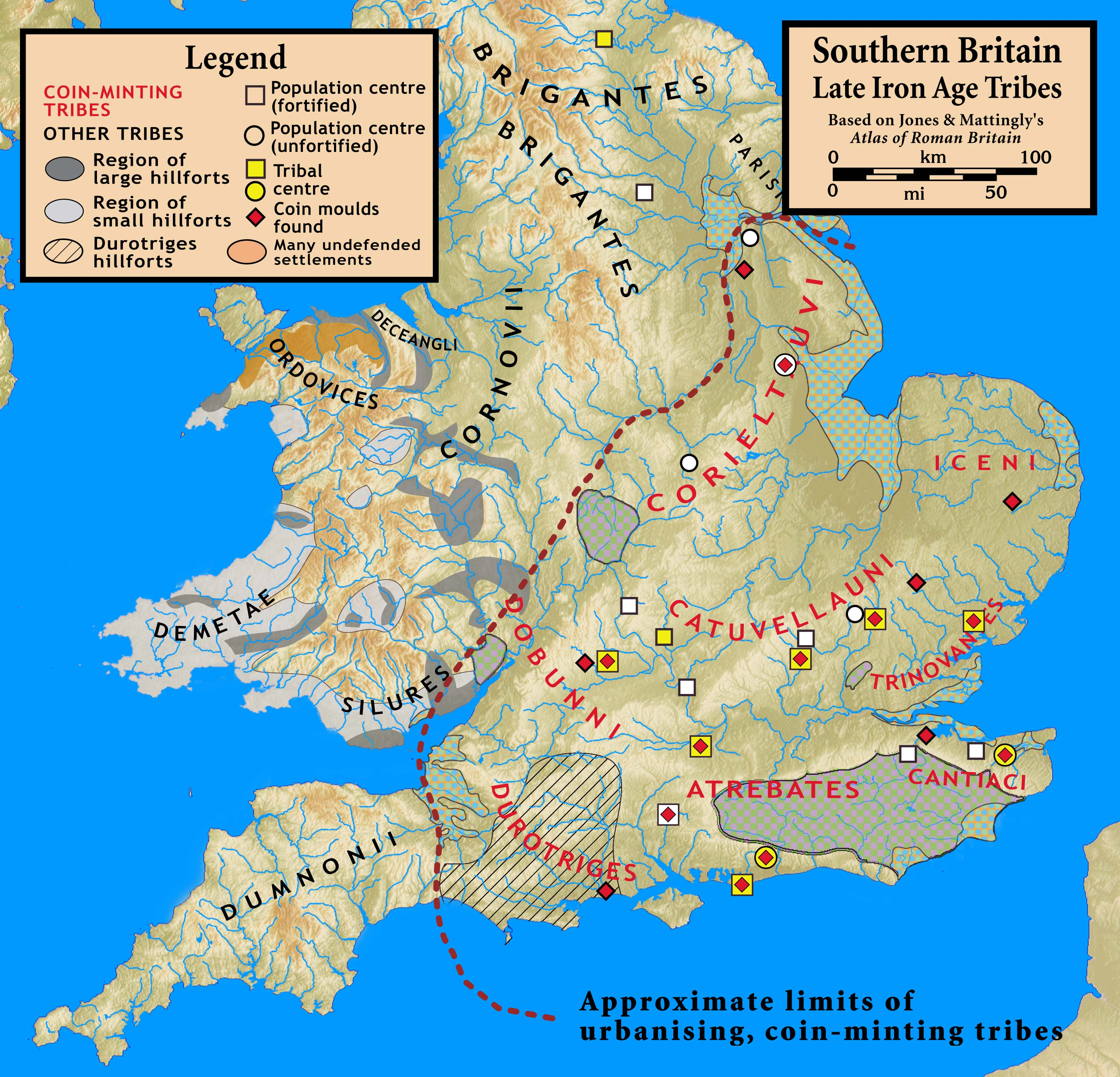
Southern Britain in the Late pre-Roman Iron Age

Britain had long been known to the classical world as a source of tin. The coastline had been explored by the Greek geographer Pytheas in the 4th century BC, and may have been explored even earlier, in the 5th century, by the Carthaginian sailor Himilco. But to many Romans, the island, lying as it did beyond the Ocean at what was to them the edge of the known world, was a land of great mystery. Some Roman writers even insisted that it did not exist and dismissed reports of Pytheas's voyage as a hoax.

Britain during the reign of Julius Caesar had an Iron Age culture, with an estimated population of between one and four million. Archaeological research shows that its economy was broadly divided into lowland and highland zones. In the lowland southeast, large areas of fertile soil made possible extensive arable farming, and communication developed along trackways, such as the Icknield Way, the Pilgrims' Way and the Jurassic Way, and navigable rivers such as the Thames. In the highlands, north of the line between Gloucester and Lincoln, arable land was available only in isolated pockets, so pastoralism, supported by garden cultivation, was more common than settled farming, and communication was more difficult. Settlements were generally built on high ground and fortified, but in the southeast, oppida (fortified towns) had begun to be established on lower ground, often at river crossings, suggesting that trade was becoming more important. Commercial contact between Britain and the continent had increased since the Roman conquest of Transalpine Gaul in 124 BC, and Italian wine was being imported via the Armorican peninsula, much of it arriving at Hengistbury Head in Dorset.

Caesar's written account of Britain says that the Belgae of northeastern Gaul had previously conducted raids on Britain, establishing settlements in some of its coastal areas, and that within living memory Diviciacus, king of the Suessiones, had held power in Britain as well as in Gaul. British coinage from this period shows a complicated pattern of intrusion. The earliest Gallo-Belgic Celtic coins that have been found in Britain date to before 100 BC, perhaps as early as 150 BC, were struck in Gaul and have been found mainly in Kent. Later coins of a similar type were struck in Britain and are found all along the south coast as far west as Dorset. It appears that Belgic power was concentrated on the southeastern coast, although their influence spread further west and inland, perhaps through chieftains establishing political control over the native population.

== Motivation ==
Caesar had been conquering Gaul since 58 BC and in 56 BC he took most of northwest Gaul after defeating the Veneti in the naval Battle of Morbihan.

Caesar's pretext for the invasion was that "in almost all the wars with the Gauls succours had been furnished to our enemy from that country" with fugitives from among the Gallic Belgae fleeing to Belgic settlements in Britain, and the Veneti of Armorica, who controlled seaborne trade to the island, calling in aid from their British allies to fight for them against Caesar in 56 BC. Strabo says that the Venetic rebellion in 56 BC had been intended to prevent Caesar from travelling to Britain and disrupting their commercial activity, suggesting that the possibility of a British expedition had already been considered by then.

It may also have been a cover for investigating Britain's mineral resources and economic potential: afterwards, Cicero refers to the disappointing discovery that there was no gold or silver in the island; and Suetonius reports that Caesar was said to have gone to Britain in search of pearls.

However, it may have been an excuse to gain stature in the eyes of the Roman people, due to Pompey and Crassus' consulship. On the one hand, they were Caesar's political allies, and Crassus's son had fought under him the year before. But they were also his rivals, and had formidable reputations (Pompey was a great general, and Crassus was fabulously wealthy). Since the consuls could easily sway and buy public opinion, Caesar needed to stay in the public eye. His solution was to cross two water bodies no Roman army had attempted before: the Rhine and the English Channel.

== First invasion (55 BC) ==
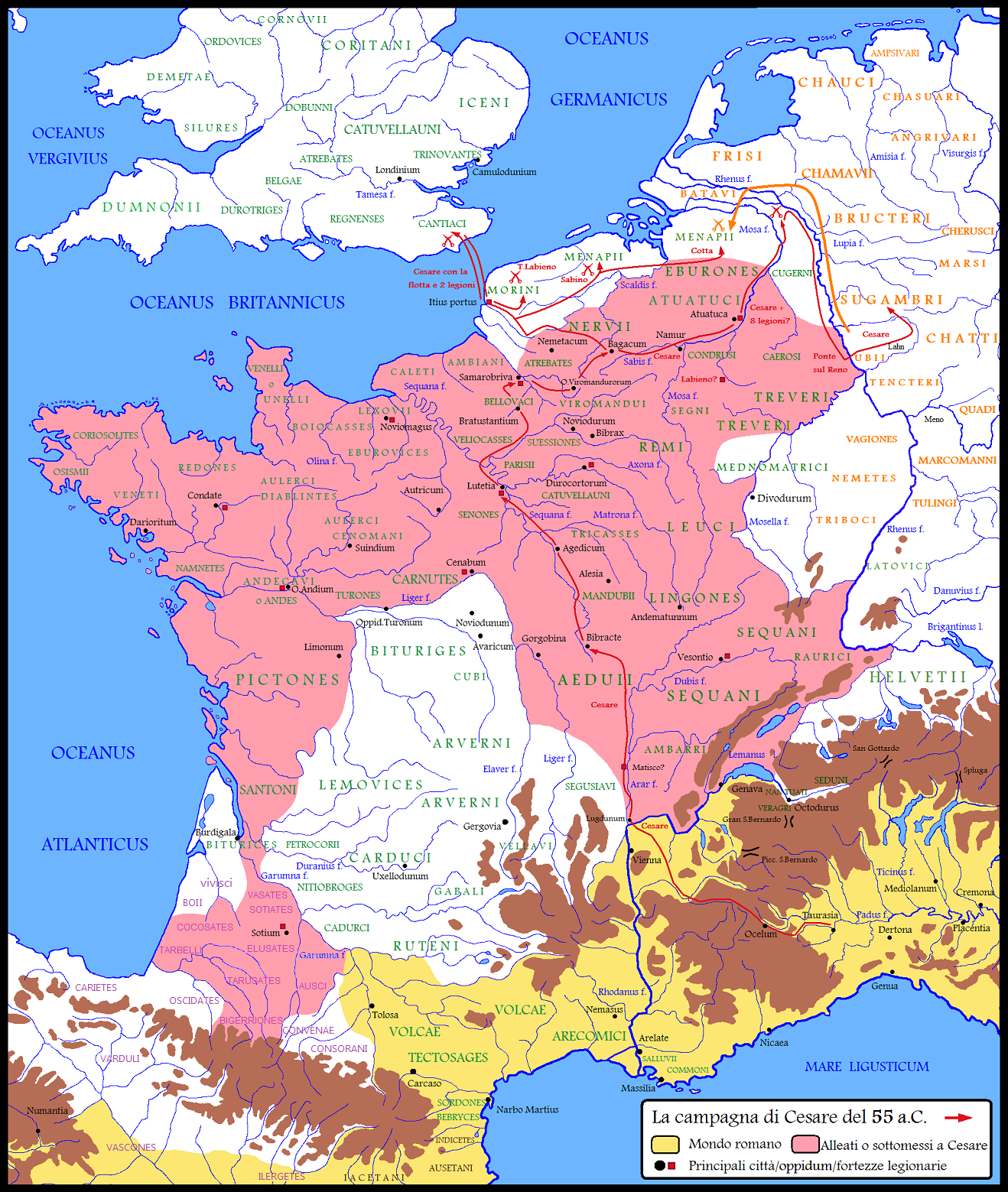
Campaign map of 55 BC. Note Caesar's crossing of the Rhine, with Germanic counter movements in orange

=== Planning and reconnaissance ===
Caesar summoned merchants who traded with the island, but they were unable or unwilling to give him any useful information about the inhabitants and their military tactics, or about harbours he could use, presumably not wanting to lose their monopoly on cross-channel trade. He sent a tribune, Gaius Volusenus, to scout the coast in a single warship. He probably examined the Kent coast between Hythe and Sandwich, but was unable to land, since he "did not dare leave his ship and entrust himself to the barbarians", and after five days returned to give Caesar what intelligence he had managed to gather.

By then, ambassadors from some of the British states, warned by merchants of the impending invasion, had arrived promising their submission. Caesar sent them back, along with his ally Commius, king of the Belgae Atrebates, to use their influence to win over as many other states as possible.

He gathered a fleet consisting of eighty transport ships, sufficient to carry two legions (Legio VII and Legio X), and an unknown number of warships under a quaestor, at an unnamed port in the territory of the Morini, almost certainly Portus Itius (Saint-Omer). Another eighteen transports of cavalry were to sail from a different port, probably Ambleteuse. These ships may have been triremes or biremes, or may have been adapted from Venetic designs Caesar had seen previously, or may even have been requisitioned from the Veneti and other coastal tribes.

In late summer 55 BC, even though it was late in the campaigning season, Caesar decided to embark for Britain.

=== Landing ===
Caesar moved quickly, leaving a garrison at the port and set out "at the third watch" past midnight on the 23 August with the legions so that they would arrive at dawn, leaving the cavalry to march to their ships, embark, and join him as soon as possible. Though Caesar could not have known, many historians consider that Caesar's separation of the cavalry from the legions was possibly a tactical mistake due to the infantry lacking baggage or heavy siege gear. Alternatively, it could also suggest that the invasion was not intended for complete conquest.

During Caesar's initial attempts at making a landing, the massed forces of the Britons gathered on the overlooking hills dissuaded him. After waiting at anchor for nine hours until around 3 PM, waiting both for his supply ships from the second port to come up and also convening a war council, Caesar ordered the fleet to sail along the coast to an open beach.

The massive Briton force, including cavalry and chariots kept pace with the fleet, making the legions hesitant to attempt a landing. In addition to lacking cavalry and heavy equipment, the loaded Roman ships were too low in the water to go close inshore and the troops had to disembark in deeper water, making them vulnerable to enemy attack while in the shallows. To break the stalemate, it was recorded that the legion's standard bearer jumped into the sea and waded to shore. Due to the fact that having the legion's standard fall in combat was a great humiliation, and the other men were also forced to disembark. After some delay, a battle line was eventually formed, and the Britons withdrew. The cavalry auxiliaries were unable to make the crossing despite several attempts, preventing Caesar from chasing down the Britons.

=== Skirmishes ===
The Romans established a camp and received ambassadors and had Commius, who had been arrested as soon as he had arrived in Britain, returned to them. Caesar claims he was negotiating from a position of strength and that the British leaders, blaming their attacks on him on the common people, were in only four days awed into giving hostages, some immediately, some as soon as they could be brought from inland, and disbanding their army. However, after his cavalry had come within sight of the beachhead but then been scattered and turned back to Gaul by storms, and with food running short, Caesar was taken by surprise by high British tides and a storm. His beached warships filled with water, and his transports, riding at anchor, were driven against each other. Some ships were wrecked, and many others were rendered unseaworthy by the loss of rigging or other vital equipment, threatening the return journey.

Realising this and hoping to keep Caesar in Britain over the winter and thus starve him into submission, the Britons renewed the attack, ambushing one of the legions as it foraged near the Roman camp. The foraging party was relieved by the remainder of the Roman force and the Britons were again driven off, only to regroup after several days of storms with a larger force to attack the Roman camp. This attack was driven off fully, in a bloody rout, with improvised cavalry that Commius had gathered from pro-Roman Britons and a Roman scorched earth policy.

The campaigning season was now nearly over, and the legions were in no condition to winter on the coast of Kent. Caesar withdrew back across the Channel with as many of the ships as could be repaired with flotsam from the wrecked ships.

=== Conclusion ===
Caesar again avoided a set-back. Taking an understrength army with few provisions to Britain was a decision that carried a high risk from a strategic view-point, which easily could have led to Caesar's defeat, yet he survived. While he had achieved no significant gains in Britain, he had accomplished a notable feat simply by landing there. It was a propaganda victory as well, which was chronicled in Caesar's ongoing Commentarii de Bello Gallico. The writings in the Commentarii fed Rome a steady update of Caesar's exploits (with his own personal spin on events). Caesar's goal of prestige and publicity succeeded: upon his return to Rome, he was hailed as a hero and given an unprecedented 20-day thanksgiving.

== Second invasion (54 BC) ==
=== Preparation ===
Caesar's approach in the winter of 55–54 BC towards the invasion in 54 BC was far more comprehensive and successful than his initial expedition. New ships had been built over the winter, using experience of Venetic shipbuilding technology being broader and lower for easier beaching, and Caesar now took 800 ships, five legions (instead of two) and 2,000 cavalry. He left the rest of his army in Gaul to keep order. Caesar took with him a good number of Gallic chiefs whom he considered untrustworthy so he could keep an eye on them.

This time he named Portus Itius as the departure point.

=== Crossing ===
Titus Labienus was left at Portus Itius to oversee regular food transports from there to the British beachhead. The military ships were joined by a flotilla of trading ships captained by Romans and provincials from across the empire, and local Gauls, hoping to cash in on the trading opportunities. It seems more likely that the figure Caesar quotes for the fleet (800 ships) include these traders and the troop-transports, rather than the troop-transports alone.

The Roman fleet sailed from France in the evening so that the army could land in daylight. They hoped to use the wind to help cross the Channel, but by midnight the wind dropped and the channel tide carried them too far northeast and at sunrise they saw Britain in the distance on their left. They managed to row and use the reversing tide to arrive at the place identified as the best landing-place the previous year.

=== Landing ===
Archaeology by the University of Leicester in 2010 and 2017, taken with Caesar's own description, indicates that the likely landing beach was at Ebbsfleet in Pegwell Bay where artefacts and massive earthworks dating from this period have been exposed. The defensive ditch enclosed an area of over 20 hectares (49 acres), now about 1 km from the sea due to siltation of the former Wantsum Channel, but in ancient times on a peninsula projecting into the channel. If Caesar had as large a fleet with him as has been suggested, then it is possible that the beaching of ships would have been spread out over a number of miles stretching from Walmer towards Pegwell Bay.

The Britons had gathered to oppose the landing but as Caesar states, intimidated by the size of the fleet, withdrew 'and concealed themselves on the high ground' perhaps to give them time to gather their forces. Caesar landed and immediately went to find the Britons' army.

=== Kent campaign ===
Upon landing, Caesar left Quintus Atrius in charge of the beach-head with an equivalent of a legion to build and defend the base. He then made an immediate night march 12 mi (19 km) inland, where he encountered the British forces at a river crossing, probably somewhere on the River Stour. The Britons attacked but were repulsed, and attempted to regroup at a fortified place in the forests, possibly the hillfort at Bigbury Wood, Kent, but were again defeated and scattered. As it was late in the day and Caesar was unsure of the territory, he called off the pursuit and made camp.

However, the next morning, as he prepared to advance further, Caesar received word from Atrius that, once again, his ships at anchor had been dashed against each other in a storm and suffered considerable damage. About forty, he says, were lost. The Romans were unused to Atlantic and Channel tides and storms, but nevertheless, considering the damage he had sustained the previous year, this was poor planning on Caesar's part. However, Caesar may have exaggerated the number of ships wrecked to magnify his own achievement in rescuing the situation. He returned to the coast, recalling the legions that had gone ahead, and immediately set about repairing his fleet. His men worked day and night for approximately ten days, beaching and repairing the ships, and building a fortified camp around them. Word was sent to Labienus to send more ships.

Caesar was on the coast on 1 September, from where he wrote a letter to Cicero. News must have reached Caesar at this point of the death of his daughter Julia, as Cicero refrained from replying "on account of his mourning".

=== March inland ===
Caesar then returned to the Stour crossing and found the Britons had massed their forces there. Cassivellaunus, a warlord from north of the Thames, had previously been at war with most of the British tribes. He had recently overthrown the king of the powerful Trinovantes and forced his son, Mandubracius, into exile. But now, facing invasion, the Britons had appointed Cassivellaunus to lead their combined forces. After several indecisive skirmishes, during which a Roman tribune, Quintus Laberius Durus, was killed, the Britons attacked a foraging party of three legions under Gaius Trebonius, but were repulsed and routed by the pursuing Roman cavalry.

Cassivellaunus realised he could not defeat Caesar in a pitched battle. Disbanding the majority of his force and relying on the mobility of his 4,000 chariots and superior knowledge of the terrain, he used guerrilla tactics to slow the Roman advance. By the time Caesar reached the Thames, the one fordable place available to him had been fortified with sharpened stakes, both on the shore and under the water, and the far bank was defended. Second century sources state that Caesar used a large war elephant, which was equipped with armour and carried archers and slingers in its tower, to put the defenders to flight. When this unknown creature entered the river, the Britons and their horses fled and the Roman army crossed over and entered Cassivellaunus' territory. This may be a confusion with Claudius's use of elephants during his conquest of Britain in AD 43.

The Trinovantes, whom Caesar describes as the most powerful tribe in the region, and who had recently suffered at Cassivellaunus' hands, sent ambassadors, promising him aid and provisions. Mandubracius, who had accompanied Caesar, was restored as their king, and the Trinovantes provided grain and hostages. Five further tribes, the Cenimagni, Segontiaci, Ancalites, Bibroci and Cassi, surrendered to Caesar, and revealed to him the location of Cassivellaunus' stronghold, possibly the hill fort at Wheathampstead, which he proceeded to put under siege.

Cassivellaunus sent word to his allies in Kent, Cingetorix, Carvilius, Taximagulus and Segovax, described as the "four kings of Cantium", to stage a diversionary attack on the Roman beach-head to draw Caesar off, but this attack failed, and Cassivellaunus sent ambassadors to negotiate a surrender. Caesar was eager to return to Gaul for the winter due to growing unrest there, and an agreement was mediated by Commius. Cassivellaunus gave hostages, agreed to an annual tribute, and undertook not to make war against Mandubracius or the Trinovantes. Caesar wrote to Cicero on 26 September, confirming the result of the campaign, with hostages but no booty taken, and that his army was about to return to Gaul. He then left, leaving not a single Roman soldier in Britain to enforce his settlement. Whether the tribute was ever paid is unknown.

Caesar extracted payment of grain, slaves, and an annual tribute to Rome. However, Britain was not particularly rich at the time; Marcus Cicero summed up Roman sentiment by saying, "It's also been established that there isn't a scrap of silver in the island and no hope of booty except for slaves – and I don't suppose you're expecting them to know much about literature or music!" Regardless, this second trip to Britain was a true invasion, and Caesar achieved his goals. One interpretation is that he had beaten the Britons and extracted tribute; they were now effectively Roman subjects. Caesar was lenient towards the tribes as he needed to leave before the stormy season set in, which would make crossing the channel impossible.

However, another interpretation of the details is that Caesar had made a weakly enforced treaty with the Catuvellauni, suggesting that a decisive victory did not occur upon the Britons. Caesar achieving popularity with the Roman peoples, and Cassivellaunus' achievement of the maintained autonomy of the Britons. This is evidenced via the next identifiable king of the Trinovantes, known from numismatic evidence, was Addedomarus, who took power c. 20–15 BC, and moved the tribe's capital to Camulodunum. For a brief period c. 10 BC Tasciovanus of the Catuvellauni issued coins from Camulodunum, suggesting that he conquered the Trinobantes in direct violation of the treaty.

== Aftermath ==
Commius later switched sides, fighting in Vercingetorix's rebellion. After a number of unsuccessful engagements with Caesar's forces, he cut his losses and fled to Britain. Sextus Julius Frontinus, in his Strategemata, describes how Commius and his followers, with Caesar in pursuit, boarded their ships. Although the tide was out and the ships still beached, Commius ordered the sails raised. Caesar, still some distance away, assumed the ships were afloat and called off the pursuit. John Creighton believes that this anecdote was a legend, and that Commius was sent to Britain as a friendly king as part of his truce with Mark Antony. Commius established a dynasty in the Hampshire area, known from coins of Gallo-Belgic type. Verica, the king whose exile prompted Claudius's conquest of AD 43, styled himself a son of Commius.

== Discoveries about Britain ==
As well as noting elements of British warfare, particularly the use of chariots, which were unfamiliar to his Roman audience, Caesar also aimed to impress them by making further geographical, meteorological and ethnographic investigations of Britain. He probably gained these by enquiry and hearsay rather than direct experience, as he did not penetrate that far into the interior, and most historians would be wary of applying them beyond the tribes with whom he came into direct contact.

=== Geographical and meteorological ===
Caesar's first-hand discoveries were limited to east Kent and the Thames Valley, but he was able to provide a description of the island's geography and meteorology. Though his measurements are not wholly accurate, and may owe something to Pytheas, his general conclusions even now seem valid:

The climate is more temperate than in Gaul, the colds being less severe.

The island is triangular in its form, and one of its sides is opposite to Gaul. One angle of this side, which is in Kent, whither almost all ships from Gaul are directed, [looks] to the east; the lower looks to the south. This side extends about 500 miles. Another side lies toward Hispania and the west, on which part is Ireland, less, as is reckoned, than Britain, by one half: but the passage from it into Britain is of equal distance with that from Gaul. In the middle of this voyage, is an island, which is called Mona: many smaller islands besides are supposed to lie there, of which islands some have written that at the time of the winter solstice it is night there for thirty consecutive days. We, in our inquiries about that matter, ascertained nothing, except that, by accurate measurements with water, we perceived the nights to be shorter there than on the continent. The length of this side, as their account states, is 700 miles. The third side is toward the north, to which portion of the island no land is opposite; but an angle of that side looks principally toward Germany. This side is considered to be 800 miles in length. Thus the whole island is about 2,000 miles in circumference.

No information about harbours or other landing-places was available to the Romans before Caesar's expeditions, so Caesar was able to make discoveries of benefit to Roman military and trading interests. Volusenus's reconnaissance voyage before the first expedition apparently identified the natural harbour at Dubris (Dover), although Caesar was prevented from landing there and forced to land on an open beach, as he did again the following year, perhaps because Dover was too small for his much larger forces. The great natural harbours further up the coast at Rutupiae (Richborough), which were used by Claudius for his invasion 100 years later, were not used on either occasion. Caesar may have been unaware of them, may have chosen not to use them, or they may not have existed in a form suitable for sheltering and landing such a large force at that time. Present knowledge of the period geomorphology of the Wantsum Channel that created that haven is limited.

By Claudius's time Roman knowledge of the island would have been considerably increased by a century of trade and diplomacy, and four abortive invasion attempts. However, it is likely that the intelligence gathered in 55 and 54 BC would have been retained in the now-lost state records in Rome, and been used by Claudius in the planning of his landings.

=== Ethnography ===
The Britons are defined as typical barbarians, with polygamy and other exotic social habits, similar in many ways to the Gauls, yet as brave adversaries whose crushing can bring glory to a Roman:

The interior portion of Britain is inhabited by those of whom they say that it is handed down by tradition that they were born in the island itself: the maritime portion by those who had passed over from the country of the Belgae for the purpose of plunder and making war; almost all of whom are called by the names of those states from which being sprung they went thither, and having waged war, continued there and began to cultivate the lands. The number of the people is countless, and their buildings exceedingly numerous, for the most part very like those of the Gauls... They do not regard it lawful to eat the hare, and the cock, and the goose; they, however, breed them for amusement and pleasure.

The most civilised of all these nations are they who inhabit Kent, which is entirely a maritime district, nor do they differ much from the Gallic customs. Most of the inland inhabitants do not sow corn, but live on milk and flesh, and are clad with skins. All the Britons, indeed, dye themselves with woad, which occasions a bluish colour, and thereby have a more terrible appearance in fight. They wear their hair long, and have every part of their body shaved except their head and upper lip. Ten and even twelve have wives common to them, and particularly brothers among brothers, and parents among their children; but if there be any issue by these wives, they are reputed to be the children of those by whom respectively each was first espoused when a virgin.

=== Military ===
In addition to infantry and cavalry, the Britons employed chariots in warfare, a novelty to the Romans, who used them for transport and racing. Caesar describes their use as follows:

Their mode of fighting with their chariots is this: firstly, they drive about in all directions and throw their weapons and generally break the ranks of the enemy with the very dread of their horses and the noise of their wheels; and when they have worked themselves in between the troops of horse, leap from their chariots and engage on foot. The charioteers in the meantime withdraw some little distance from the battle, and so place themselves with the chariots that, if their masters are overpowered by the number of the enemy, they may have a ready retreat to their own troops. Thus they display in battle the speed of horse, [together with] the firmness of infantry; and by daily practice and exercise attain to such expertness that they are accustomed, even on a declining and steep place, to check their horses at full speed, and manage and turn them in an instant and run along the pole, and stand on the yoke, and thence betake themselves with the greatest celerity to their chariots again.

=== Technology ===
During the civil war, Caesar made use of a kind of boat he had seen used in Britain, similar to the Irish currach or Welsh coracle. He describes them thus:

[T]he keels and ribs were made of light timber, then, the rest of the hull of the ships was wrought with wicker work, and covered over with hides.

=== Religion ===
"The institution [of Druidism] is thought to have originated in Britain, and to have been thence introduced into Gaul; and even now those who wish to become more accurately acquainted with it, generally repair thither, for the sake of learning it."

=== Economic resources ===
Caesar not only investigates this for the sake of it, but also to justify Britain as a rich source of tribute and trade:

[T]he number of cattle is great. They use either brass or iron rings, determined at a certain weight, as their money. Tin is produced in the midland regions; in the maritime, iron; but the quantity of it is small: they employ brass, which is imported. There, as in Gaul, is timber of every description, except beech and fir.

This reference to the 'midland' is inaccurate as tin production and trade occurred in the southwest of Britain, in Cornwall and Devon, and was what drew Pytheas and other traders. However, Caesar only penetrated to Essex and so, receiving reports of the trade whilst there, it would have been easy to perceive the trade as coming from the interior.

== Outcome ==
Caesar made no conquests in Britain, but his enthroning of Mandubracius marked the beginnings of a system of client kingdoms there, thus bringing the island into Rome's sphere of political influence. Diplomatic and trading links developed further over the next century, opening up the possibility of permanent conquest, which was finally begun by Claudius in AD 43. In the words of Tacitus:

It was, in fact, the deified Julius who first of all Romans entered Britain with an army: he overawed the natives by a successful battle and made himself master of the coast; but it may be said that he revealed, rather than bequeathed, Britain to Rome.

Lucan's Pharsalia (II,572) makes the jibe that Caesar had:

...run away in terror from the Britons whom he had come to attack!

== In later literature and culture ==
=== Classical works ===
- Valerius Maximus's Memorable Words and Deeds (1st century AD) praises the bravery of Marcus Caesius Scaeva, a centurion under Caesar, who, having been deserted by his comrades, held his position alone against a horde of Britons on a small island, before finally swimming to safety.
- Polyaenus's 2nd-century Strategemata relates that, when Cassivellaunus was defending a river crossing against him, Caesar gained passage by the use of an armoured elephant, which terrified the Britons into fleeing. This may be a confusion with Claudius's use of elephants during his conquest of Britain in AD 43.
- Orosius's 5th-century History Against the Pagans contains a brief account of Caesar's invasions, which makes an influential mistake: Quintus Laberius Durus, the tribune who died in Britain, is misnamed "Labienus", an error which is followed by all medieval British accounts.

=== Medieval works ===
- Bede's History of the English Church and People includes an account of Caesar's invasions. This account is taken almost word for word from Orosius, which suggests Bede read a copy of this work from the library at Monkwearmouth-Jarrow Priory which Benedict Biscop had brought from Rome itself.
- The 9th-century Historia Britonum attributed to Nennius gives a garbled account, in which Caesar invades three times, landing at the Thames Estuary rather than on a beach in Kent. His chief opponent is Dolobellus, proconsul of the British king Belinus, son of Minocannus. Caesar finally defeats the Britons at a place called Trinovantum.
- Henry of Huntingdon's 12th-century Historia Anglorum gives an account based on Bede and the Historia Britonum, and gives Caesar an inspirational speech to his troops.
- Geoffrey of Monmouth, in his History of the Kings of Britain, has Caesar invading Britain, and has Cassibelanus (i.e. Cassivellaunus) as Caesar's primary opponent, but otherwise differs from the historical record. As in the Historia Britonum, Caesar invades three times, not twice, landing at the Thames Estuary. His story is also largely based on Bede and the Historia Britonum, but is greatly expanded. Historical elements are modified – the stakes placed in the Thames by the Britons become anti-ship rather than anti-infantry and anti-cavalry devices – and other elements, such as Cassibelanus's brother Nennius engaging in hand-to-hand combat with Caesar and stealing his sword, called Crocea Mors, are not known from any earlier source. Adaptations such as Wace's Roman de Brut, Layamon's Brut and the Welsh Bruts largely follow Geoffrey's story.
- The medieval Welsh Triads also refer to Caesar's invasions. Some of these references appear directly related to Geoffrey's account, but others allude to independent traditions: Caswallawn (Cassivellaunus) is said to have gone to Rome in search of his lover, Fflur, to have allowed Caesar to land in Britain in return for a horse called Meinlas, and pursued Caesar in a great fleet after he returned to Gaul. The 18th-century collection of Triads compiled by Iolo Morganwg contains expanded versions of these traditions.
- The 13th-century French work Li Fet des Romains contains an account of Caesar's invasions based partly on Caesar and partly on Geoffrey. It adds an explanation of how Caesar's soldiers overcame the stakes in the Thames – they tied wooden splints filled with sulphur around them, and burned them using Greek fire. It also identifies the standard-bearer of the 10th legion as Valerius Maximus's Scaeva.
- In the 14th-century French romance Perceforest Caesar, a precocious 21-year-old warrior, invades Britain because one of his knights, Luces, is in love with the wife of the king of England. Afterwards, a Briton called Orsus Bouchesuave takes a lance which Caesar used to kill his uncle, makes twelve iron styluses from the head, and, alongside Brutus, Cassius and other senators, uses them to stab Caesar to death.

=== 20th century popular culture ===
- E. Nesbit's 1906 children's novel The Story of the Amulet depicts Caesar on the shores of Gaul, contemplating an invasion.
- In Robert Graves's 1934 and 1935 novels I, Claudius and Claudius the God, Claudius refers to Caesar's invasions when discussing his own invasion. In the 1976 TV adaptation of the two books they are mentioned in a scene during Augustus's reign where young members of the imperial family are playing a board game (not unlike Risk) in which areas of the empire must be conquered and arguing about how many legions it theoretically needs to capture and hold Britain, and again in the speech in which Claudius announces his own invasion ("100 years since the divine Julius left it, Britain is once again a province of Rome").
- The 1957 Goon Show episode The Histories of Pliny the Elder, a pastiche of epic films, involves Caesar invading Britain, defeating the Britons who think the battle is a football match and so only send 10 men against the Romans, and occupying Britain for 10 years or more.
- The 1964 film Carry On Cleo features Caesar and Mark Antony (not present during either invasion) invading Britain and enslaving cavemen there.
- In Goscinny and Uderzo's 1965 comic Asterix in Britain, Caesar has successfully conquered Britain because the Britons stop fighting every afternoon for a cup of hot water with milk (tea not yet having been brought to Europe), as well as on weekends. This behaviour prompted the Romans to only attack at 5 o'clock during the week, and at weekends.
- The Romans in Britain is a 1980 stage play by Howard Brenton that comments upon imperialism and the abuse of power. It was the subject of an unsuccessful private prosecution for gross indecency.

== See also ==
- Devil's Dyke, Hertfordshire
