= Fuimus Troes =

- Original language: English
- Written by: Jasper Fisher
- Subject: Julius Caesar invades Britain
- Genre: history play
- Setting: Ancient Britain

Premiere
- Date: c. 1607–1625
- Place: Magdalen College, Oxford

Fuimus Troes is a verse drama attributed to Jasper Fisher about Julius Caesar's invasion of Britain in 55 BC. It was published in quarto in London, 1633. The drama is written in blank verse, interspersed with lyrics; Druids, poets, and a harper are introduced, and it ends with a masque and chorus.

== Publication ==
It was published by Robert Allott in 1633. The title page describes it as, "Fuimus Troes, the True Trojans, being a story of the Britaines valour at the Romanes first invasion. Publickly presented by the gentlemen students of Magdalen College in Oxford. Quis Martem tunicâ tectum adamantinâ Dignè scripserit?". London, printed by I. L. for Robert Allott; and to be sold at the sign of the Bear, St Paul's Churchyard, 1633. 4to". The Latin tag is an abbreviation of a passage from Horace's ode Scriberis Vario (I:6): "Quis Martem, tunicâ adamantinâ tectum, aut Merionen, pulvere Troico nigrum, aut Tydiden, ope Palladis superîs parem, dignê scripserit?" (Who may fitly sing of Mars array'd in adamant mail, or Merion, black with dust of Troy, or Tydeus' son by Pallas' aid strong against gods to thrust?).

It was probably performed at Magdalen College, Oxford by the students some time before 1625.

== Trojan myth ==
The title derives from a line in Virgil's Aeneid, "Fuimus Troes, fuit Ilium et ingens / gloria Teucrorum" (We were Trojans, this was Ilium and the mighty glory of the Teucrians). The play's title, "we were Trojans", refers to the legend that both the Britons and the Romans were descended from the survivors of ancient Troy, through Aeneas. In the context of the Protestant culture of the time, the play seeks to validate an opposition between Britain and Rome, setting up the British as eternal enemies of Roman authority. The descent of the British from Aeneas's grandson Brutus of Troy is portrayed as a fact well known to Caesar. The British leader Cassibelan attempts to appeal to their common ancestry, saying "As you from Troy, so we, our pedigree do claim; / Why should the branches fight, when as the root's the same?" The martial prowess of the Britons continually linked to their Trojan ancestry, and they are depicted worshipping the same classical gods as the Romans. However, the common Trojan origin is set against a model of pan-Celtic identity, with the ghost of the Gallic warlord Brennus, who sacked Rome in 387 BC, supporting the Britons.

In order to integrate the Trojan mythology Fisher has to reconcile contradictions between Caesar's own account of events and the story as presented by Geoffrey of Monmouth, the principal source for the Trojan-origin story. To achieve this, Fisher splits Androgeus and Mandubratius into two separate characters, though "Androgeus" is simply Geoffrey's own version of the latter's name.

== Characters ==
- Mercury
- Brennus
- Camillus
- Julius Caesar
- Volusenus
- Quintus Laberius Durus, called Labienus
- Atrius
- Comius Atrebas
- Cassibelan (Cassibelanus), king of Britain
- Mandubratius, king of the Trinovantes
- Cingetorix, Kentish lord
- Carvilius, Kentish lord
- Taximagulus, Kentish lord
- Segonax, Kentish lord
- Androgeus, son of Lud
- Tenantius, son of Lud
- Nennius, brother of Lud
- Belinus, a British nobleman
- Hirildas, nephew of Cassibelanus
- Eulinus, nephew of Androgeus
- Cridous, king of Albania
- Britael, king of Demetia
- Guerthed, king of Ordovicia
- Lantonus, a druid
- Hulacus, a druid

== Plot ==
The ghosts of the Gallic leader Brennus and his Roman antagonist Camillus discuss the long-standing conflicts between their peoples as they watch Caesar preparing to invade Britain. Nennius of Britain exhorts the Britons to defend their island from the Romans. Caesar explains his plans to his men, justifying the invasion because the Britons had helped the Gauls to resist him. In Britain, Druids call on the gods for aid. Meanwhile, Eulinus, a British warrior, discusses with his friend Hirildas his infatuation with Landora, a woman of the Trinovante clan. The British tribes unite under Cassibelan; the king of the Scots sends Pictish warriors to aid the Britons. The ghost of Brennus appears to Nennius to inspire him to heroic deeds.

After the Romans land Cassibelan tells Caesar that he should not be attacking his kinfolk in Britain, but Caesar says he must expand Rome's power. The Britons beat off the Romans. In hand-to-hand combat with Caesar, Nennius is wounded, but he takes Caesar's sword from him. Humiliated, Caesar flees. Nennius starts to feel weak, and realises that the sword was poisoned. Still, he summons enough energy to fight and kill Labienus.

The Britons celebrate their victory, but Nennius dies of his wounds, exhorting the Britons to "protect this isle, confound all foreign plots". At his funeral, a fencing match between tribal champions leads to the death of Cassibelan's nephew Hirildas at the hands of his friend Eulinus. Eulinus is horrified and tries to kill himself, but is stopped. Cassibelan demands that the killer be punished, but Eulinus' uncle Androgeus, refuses. Androgeus joins with Mandubratius, king of the Trionovantes. The dispute leads to a war between the tribes.

Mandubratius, angry with Cassibelan, visits Caesar and persuades him to invade again. Caesar builds up a mighty force and allies with the Trinovantes. Despite valiant resistance Cassibelan is forced to admit defeat. Eulinus learns that his beloved Landora has taken poison because of the conflict. In despair, he stabs himself. With Eulinus dead Androgeus agrees to reconcile with Cassibelan, who agrees to pay a tribute to Rome. Caesar tells Androgeus and Mandubratius to acknowledge Cassibelan as king of all the Britons.

The ghosts of Brennus and Camillus return with the god Mercury. They debate the relative merits of the Britons and the Romans. Brennus insists that only a Caesar could beat the Britons, and that should Rome ever become tyrannous "generous spirits will break this compact like a spider's web". Mercury predicts that Britain's embrace of "the world's fourth empire" will usher in an age of universal peace.

== Attribution ==
The attribution to Fisher is generally accepted, but it has sometimes been argued that the play predates Fisher's career at Oxford and may have been written as early as 1603. The fact that one of the songs is in a Scottish dialect has been interpreted as an attempt to please the Scottish king James VI, who had become king James I of England in 1603. Fisher became a student in 1607, and could have written it at any time in James' reign after that date. The pro-Scottish passages, including the song are the main reason for the view that it dates from before James' death in 1625.
