= 56 BC =

56 BC in various calendars
- Gregorian calendar: 56 BC; LVI BC
- Ab urbe condita: 698
- Ancient Egypt era: XXXIII dynasty, 268
- Pharaoh: Ptolemy XII Auletes, 25
- Ancient Greek Olympiad (summer): 181st Olympiad (victor)¹
- Assyrian calendar: 4695
- Balinese saka calendar: N/A
- Bengali calendar: −649 – −648
- Berber calendar: 895
- Buddhist calendar: 489
- Burmese calendar: −693
- Byzantine calendar: 5453–5454
- Chinese calendar: 甲子年 (Wood Rat); 2642 or 2435 — to — 乙丑年 (Wood Ox); 2643 or 2436
- Coptic calendar: −339 – −338
- Discordian calendar: 1111
- Ethiopian calendar: −63 – −62
- Hebrew calendar: 3705–3706
- Hindu calendars
- Vikram Samvat: 1–2
- Shaka Samvat: N/A
- Kali Yuga: 3045–3046
- Holocene calendar: 9945
- Iranian calendar: 677 BP – 676 BP
- Islamic calendar: 698 BH – 697 BH
- Javanese calendar: N/A
- Julian calendar: N/A
- Korean calendar: 2278
- Minguo calendar: 1967 before ROC 民前1967年
- Nanakshahi calendar: −1523
- Seleucid era: 256/257 AG
- Thai solar calendar: 487–488
- Tibetan calendar: ཤིང་ཕོ་བྱི་བ་ལོ་ (male Wood-Rat); 71 or −310 or −1082 — to — ཤིང་མོ་གླང་ལོ་ (female Wood-Ox); 72 or −309 or −1081

Year 56 BC was a year of the pre-Julian Roman calendar. In the Roman Republic, it was known as the Year of the Consulship of Lentulus and Philippus (or, less frequently, year 698 Ab urbe condita). The denomination 56 BC for this year has been used since the early medieval period, when the Anno Domini calendar era became the prevalent method in Europe for naming years.

== Events ==
=== By place ===
==== Roman Republic ====
- Roman Consuls are Gnaeus Cornelius Lentulus Marcellinus and Lucius Marcius Philippus.
- Clodia accuses her former lover Marcus Caelius Rufus of trying to poison her. The trial ends with the defendant acquitted thanks to the Pro Caelio speech of Cicero. There is no more reference to the formerly well-known Clodia.
- Third year of Julius Caesar's Gallic Wars:
  - Battle of Morbihan: Decimus Junius Brutus Albinus, one of Caesar's subordinates, defeats the Veneti of Brittany. The Gauls lose most of their warships to the Romans in a sea battle at modern-day Quiberon Bay. The strongholds on the coast are stormed, and the population is slaughtered or sold into slavery.
  - The three Roman politician-generals of the First Triumvirate — Caesar, Pompey and Crassus — meet at the Luca Conference at the town of Luca (modern Lucca, in Tuscany), near Pisa, where they renewed their fraying political alliance, and further cemented the three men's increasing consolidation of power in the Roman Republic.
  - Autumn – Julius Caesar leads an attack on the Morini and the Menapii tribes of the Belgae on the North Sea. They withdraw into their forests, creating difficulties for Caesar's supply lines. The onset of bad weather forces him to pull back into Gallia Belgica.

==== Britain ====
- This year, or possibly the following year, the king of the Trinovantes called Imanuentius, is overthrown and killed by his rival Cassivellaunus. His son Mandubracius flees to Gaul and appeals to Julius Caesar for help.

== Deaths ==
- Lucius Licinius Lucullus, Roman politician (b. 118 BC)
- Philip II Philoromaeus, king of the Seleucid Empire (approximate date)
- Imanuentius, the king of the Trinovantes (a kingdom in Pre-Roman Britain)
