= Cantiaci =

Iron Age Celtic people living in Britain

Geography
- Capital: Durovernum Cantiacorum (Canterbury)
- Location: Kent; East Sussex
- Rulers: Dubnovellaunus, Vosenius, Eppillus, Cunobelinus, Adminius

The Cantiaci or Cantii were an Iron Age Celtic people living in Britain before the Roman conquest who gave their name to a civitas of Roman Britain. They lived in the area now called Kent, in south-eastern England. Their capital was Durovernum Cantiacorum, now Canterbury.

They were bordered by the Regni to the west, and the Catuvellauni to the north.

Julius Caesar landed in Cantium in 55 and 54 BCE, the first Roman expeditions to Britain. He recounts in his De Bello Gallico v. 14:

Ex his omnibus longe sunt humanissimi qui Cantium incolunt, quae regio est maritima omnis, neque multum a Gallica differunt consuetudine.

Of all these [British tribes], by far the most civilised are they who dwell in Kent, which is entirely a maritime region, and who differ but little from the Gauls in their customs.

== Rulers ==
=== Pre-Roman Iron Age ===
Julius Caesar named five Celtic tribes inhabiting the land that would become the "heartland of the Catuvellauni": the Ancalites, the Bibroci, the Cassi, the Cenimagni, and the Segontiaci, each with their own "king" or chieftain. He found their way of life to be very similar to their cousins in Gaul with whom they were close – the invasion of Britain may have been triggered by the Britons' supply of arms to the Gauls, who were being subjugated by the Romans.

Caesar mentions four kings, Segovax, Carvilius, Cingetorix, and Taximagulus, who held power in Cantium at the time of his second expedition in 54 BCE. The British leader Cassivellaunus, besieged in his stronghold north of the Thames, sent a message to these four kings to attack the Roman naval camp as a distraction. The attack failed, a chieftain called Lugotorix was captured, and Cassivellaunus was forced to seek terms.

In the century between Caesar's expeditions and the conquest under Claudius (starting in 43 CE), kings in Britain began to issue coins stamped with their names. The following kings of the Cantiaci are known:

- Dubnovellaunus: May have been an ally or sub-king of Tasciovanus of the Catuvellauni, or a son of Addedomarus of the Trinovantes; presented himself as a supplicant to Augustus c. 7 BCE.
- Vosenius, ruled until c. 15 CE.
- Eppillus, originally king of the Atrebates: Coins indicate he became king of the Cantiaci c. 15 CE, at the same time as his brother Verica became king of the Atrebates.
- Cunobelinus, king of the Catuvellauni: Expanded his influence into Cantiaci territory.
- Adminius, son of Cunobelinus: Seems to have ruled on his father's behalf, beginning c. 30 CE. Suetonius tells us he was exiled by Cunobelinus c. 40 CE, leading to Caligula's aborted invasion of Britain.
- Anarevitos, known only from a coin discovered in 2010, probably a descendant of Eppillus and ruling c. 10 BCE – 20 CE.

=== Sub-Roman period ===
According to Nennius, Gwrangon was King of Kent in the time of Vortigern, until Vortigern took away the kingdom and gave it to Hengist; but Nennius is regarded as an untrustworthy source, and "Gwrangon seems to have been transported by the story-teller into Kent from Gwent" and "is turned into an imaginary King of Kent, secretly disposed of his realm in favour of Hengist, whose daughter Vortigern wished to marry".

== See also ==
- Iron Age tribes in Britain
- List of Celtic tribes

== Bibliography ==
- Julius Caesar, De Bello Gallico
- Suetonius, Lives of the Twelve Caesars
- John Creighton (2000), Coins and power in Late Iron Age Britain, Cambridge University Press
- Detsicas, Alec (1983). The Cantiaci. Sutton Publishing Ltd. ISBN 978-0862991173.
