= Nennius of Britain =

Mythical pre-Roman prince of Britain

Nennius is a mythical prince of Britain at the time of Julius Caesar's invasions of Britain (55–54 BC). His story appears in Geoffrey of Monmouth's History of the Kings of Britain (1136), a work whose contents are now considered largely fictional. In Middle Welsh versions of Geoffrey's Historia he was called Nynniaw.

In Geoffrey's story, Nennius is said to have fought Caesar in personal combat and taken his sword, which he used to kill many Romans. In the Tudor and Jacobean eras he became an emblem of British patriotism.

== Geoffrey's account ==
The History gives the following account of Nennius's life: He was the third son of Heli and brother of Lud and Cassibelanus (Note: Geoffrey HRB III.xx.) (and according to Welsh sources, of Llefelys (Note: The sources being the Brut y Brenhinedd, medieval Welsh versions of Geoffrey's Historia Regum Britanniae.) (Note: Technically speaking, Randell's paper is based on the prose tale Cyfranc Lludd a Llefelys; however, the tale occurs as interpolations ("embedded narrative", Randell (2009), p. 268) into the Brut y Brenhinedd in the early manuscripts.)). He fought alongside Cassibelanus when Caesar invaded. He and his nephew Androgeus led the troops of Trinovantum (London) and Canterbury, when they encountered Caesar's own troops and Nennius faced Caesar in single combat. Caesar struck Nennius a blow to the head, but his sword got stuck in Nennius's shield. After they separated in the melée, Nennius threw away his own sword and attacked the Romans with Caesar's sword, killing many, including the tribune Quintus Laberius Durus (whom Geoffrey erroneously names Labienus, confusing him with Titus Labienus). (Note: This was an error made by Orosius, and repeated by Bede.)

According to Geoffrey, "everyone whom Nennius struck with the sword either had his head chopped off or else was so wounded as Nennius passed that he had no hope of ever recovering". (Note: Geoffrey HRB IV.iii.) For the sword, Crocea Mors ("Yellow Death") had earned its name because no one escaped death who received a wound from it. (Note: Geoffrey HRB IV.iv.) (Note: Some modern scholars have conjectured that the naming was inspired by the "dreaded Yellow Plague (Pestis flava)". The "Yellow Plague" (Welsh: dylyt melen) is elsewhere recorded in medieval Welsh literature, and the death of Maelgwn Gwynedd was ascribed to it.)

Fifteen days after the battle Nennius died of his head wound, and was buried at London (the "City of the Trinovantes"), near the North Gate. Caesar's sword, Crocea Mors, was buried with him. (Note: Geoffrey HRB IV.iv.) (Note: According to the afroementioned Brut y Brenhinedd, the sword was named angeu coch "Red Death" (angheu coch; Aghev Coch) or angeu glas "Pale Death/Blue Death" (ageu glas [sic].))

== Later versions ==
The Anglo-Norman writer Wace expands on the story of the fight in his book Roman de Brut (1155), in which there is detailed description of the combat. Caesar defeats Nennius, but his sword is stuck in Nennius' shield, and he is forced to retreat when Nennius' friends come to his aid. In this version, the loss of his sword is a humiliation that leads to Caesar's withdrawal and inspires rebellion in France. Wace also embellished details not given by Geoffrey, adding that the name Crocea Mors was "stamped with letters of gold" on the upper part of the sword, next to the hilt. (Note: This, and the notion that the wound could be cured by no medicine are also found in Robert Mannyng's Chronicle (c. 1338): "it was writen on the hilt,/ lettres of gold burnissed bright, /þat "Crucia mors" þe suerd hight" (vv. 4449–4452).)

The account of the event also occurs in the Middle English verse Brut (ca. 1190–1215) by Layamon, which paraphrased Wace's work. The Anglo-Norman French chronicle Scalacronica (c. 1363) by Thomas Grey also contains an account of the Julian invasion, largely derived from Wace, though the relevant text (in the Roman History section) was never published in past extracts; (Note: And King, Andy, ed. (2005b). Sir Thomas Gray: Scalacronica, 1272-1363 which has been published since Nearing's paper clearly does not fill that lacuna.) the work calls the sword Crochi Amour ("Crooked Love"), though this may be a scribal error.

The Middle Welsh Brut y Brenhinedd (mid-13th century and later manuscripts) also translates the episode, expanded with Welsh-sourced material. Here Nennius is called Nynniaw or Nynnyau (also by various other spellings). (Note: Nynniaw (MS. Dingestow Court; Book of Basingwerk); Nynnyaw (Peniarth 44, Llanstephan 1); Nynnaw (Peniarth 23); Nynhyaw (Red Book of Hergest). Lexicographer Evans gives Nyniaw.) Some versions interpolate the story of Cyfranc Lludd a Llefelys and add a fourth brother named Llefelys, as already noted.

According to the Old Norse translation Breta sögur (Hauksbók copy, early 14th cent.), Nennius dies immediately the same night (Note: Rather than dying of the "head wound a fortnight later", as in Geoffrey.), because the sword had been tainted with poison.

== Modern era ==
In the Tudor period Nennius became a patriotic symbol of British independence. In the poetry collection The Mirror for Magistrates Nennius is portrayed as an "inspirational lesson for future British people to defend their country from foreign invasion". In the Parts Added to The Mirror for Magistrates, Nennius gives speech accusing Caesar of cheating by poisoning the sword-tip to deal him a shallow wound ("scarce he perced had the skin") whose venom nevertheless killed him ("my braynes it ranckle in") in fifteen days time.

Edmund Spenser's Faerie Queene Book II (1590) writes that Julius Caesar in slaying Nennius lost his sword which could still be seen, (Note: Faerie Queene, II.x.9: "was charged heauily / Of hardy Nennius, whom he yet did slay / But lost his sword, yet to be seene this day".), i.e., the sword was being displayed for viewing during the Elizabethan era. The artifact in question plausibly refers to the alleged sword Nennius took from Caesar, kept in the Tower of London, mentioned in the Anonymi Chronicon Godstovianum (15th cent.). (Note: Nearing, citing/quoting from Hearne, Thomas ed. (Oxon., 1716), Guilielmi Roperi Vita D. Thomae Mori equitis aurati, lingua anglicana contexta..: "Nennius frater Cassibulani regis eripuit gladium vel sicam de manu Julii, quae sica in hunc diem custoditur in turri London" (sg. Bb^{v}).)

Nennius also appears in plays in the Jacobean era, notably Jasper Fisher's Fuimus Troes and John Fletcher's Bonduca (c. 1613). In the former he embodies the fighting spirit of the Britons and is given the patriotic opening speech exhorting the people to resist invasion. His funeral games after his fight with Caesar form the climactic point of the play. In the latter he is anachronistically portrayed as a contemporary of Boudica, acting as one of her generals.
