= Cornovii =

Name by which 2–3 tribes were known in Roman Britain

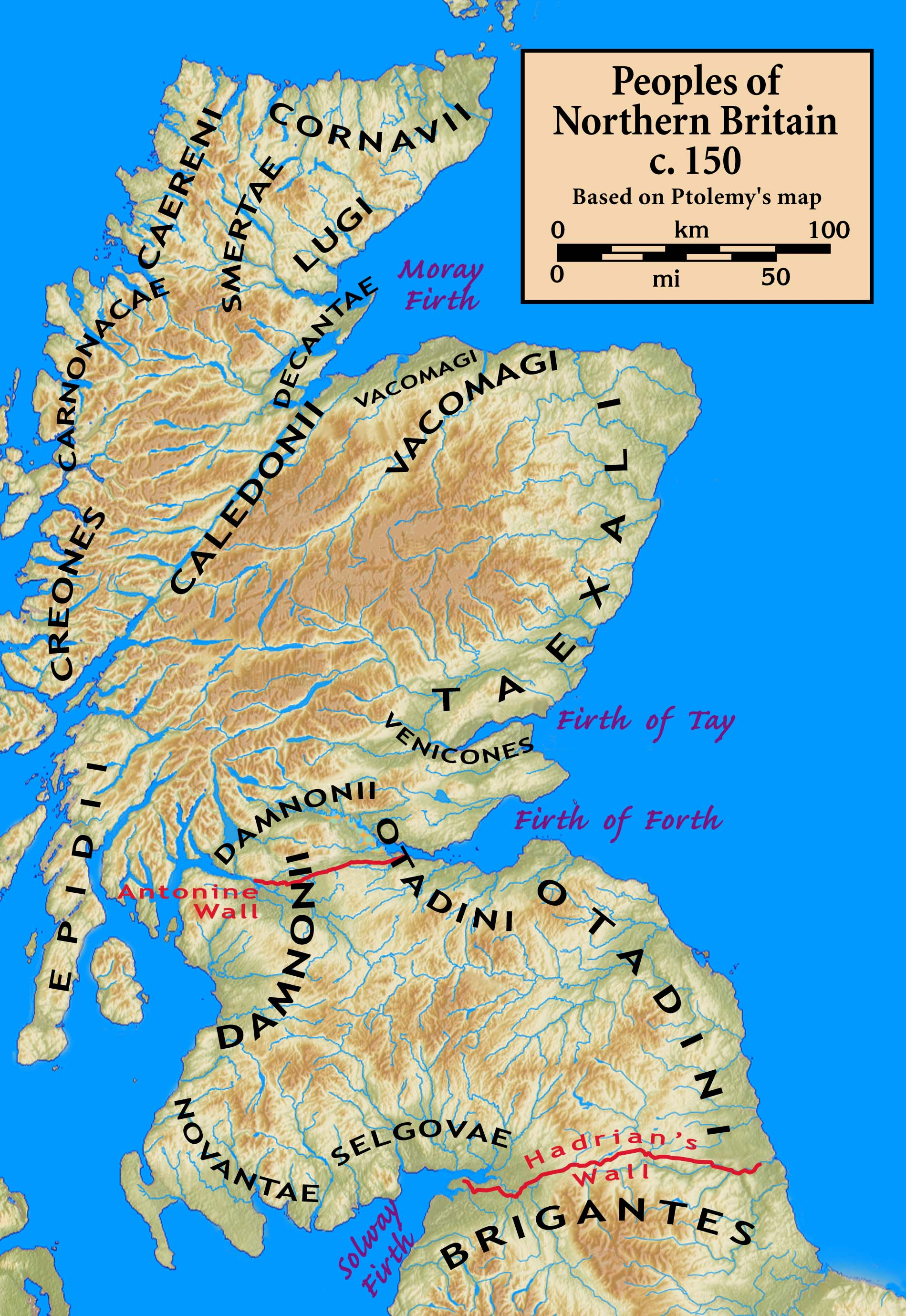
Location of the Caithness Cornovii

The Cornovii is the name by which two, or three, tribes were known in Roman Britain. One tribe was in the area centred on present-day Shropshire, one was in Caithness in northernmost Scotland, and there was probably one in Cornwall. The name has appeared in ancient sources in various forms, such as Cornavii, Cornabii, and Curnavii.

The three tribes were:

- The Cornovii (Midlands), who were based in the area around modern Shropshire. Ptolemy's 2nd century Geography names two of their towns: Deva Victrix (Chester), and Viroconium Cornoviorum (Wroxeter) which was their capital and probably the fourth largest Roman settlement in Britain.
- The Cornovii (Caithness), at the northern tip of Britain. This tribe is only known from one mention in Ptolemy's Geography.
- The Cornovii (Cornwall), part of the Dumnonii tribe in South West Britain. The existence of this sub-tribe, clan, or sept is not mentioned by Ptolemy, but has been inferred from a place-name listed in the Ravenna Cosmography of c.700 AD as purocoronavis, which is considered to be a scribal error for durocornavis (or durocornovium), meaning "the fortress of the Cornovii".

Territory of the Midlands Cornovii

== Etymology ==
The etymology of the tribal name is uncertain. Although it is accepted that *corn literally means "horn", there is disagreement over whether or not this refers to the shape of the land. Considering that Cornwall is at the end of a long tapering peninsula, many scholars have adopted this derivation for the Cornish Cornovii: Victor Watts in the Cambridge Dictionary of English Place-names (2010), for instance, derives it from a postulated original tribal name *Cornowii, "the people of the horn".

Malcolm Todd, in The South West to AD 1000 (1987), discusses the alternative etymologies that have been put forward. These include the name being a reference to dwellers in promontory forts, and an explanation hypothesised by Ann Ross in 1967 that the tribal names may be totemic cult-names referring to a "horned god" cult followed by the tribes, which Todd says may be cognate with the Gaulish Cernunnos or the unnamed horned god of the Brigantes.

The shape of the land is less likely to be the explanation for the tribe's name in Caithness, and it does not explain that use of the term for the inland Midlands tribe at all. Graham Webster in The Cornovii (1991), about the Midlands tribe, cites Anne Ross's hypothesis and points out that it is interesting that the Abbots Bromley Horn Dance has survived from pagan ritual – Abbot's Bromley being only 35 miles (55 km) away from the tribal centre of Viroconium. Webster also asserts that Professor Charles Thomas made a good case for totemic ethnonyms based on animals and birds in Scotland.

== The Morris thesis ==
In an attempt to explain the same name being used by the Midlands and Cornwall tribes, the historian John Morris put forward a theory in his work The Age of Arthur (1973), that a contingent of the Cornovii from the West Midlands was sent to Dumnonia in the mid-fifth century to rule the land there and keep out the invading Irish, seeing that a similar situation had occurred in North Wales.

Morris's theory is not generally accepted by modern scholarship. Philip Payton, in his book Cornwall: a history, says "...the Morris thesis is not widely accepted by archaeologists and early historians, and we may safely conclude that the Cornovii located west of the Tamar were an indigenous people quite separate from their namesakes in the Midlands and Caithness."
