= Cornovii (Cornwall) =

Name of a Celtic tribe in Roman-age Britain

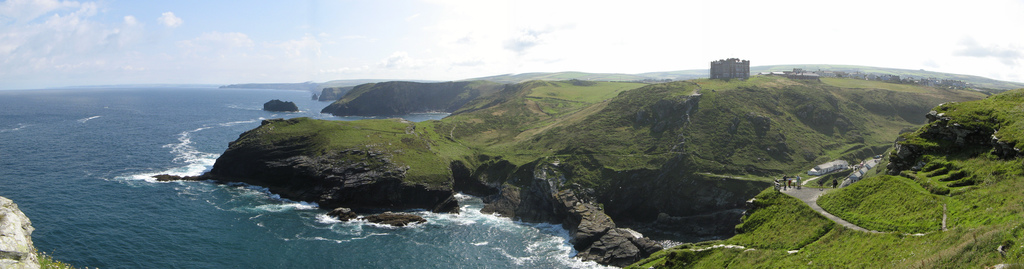
The coast at Tintagel, a possible location of a settlement of the Cornovii

The Cornovii is a name for a tribe presumed to have been part of the Dumnonii, a Celtic tribe inhabiting the south-west peninsula of Great Britain, during some part of the Iron Age, Roman and post-Roman periods. The Cornovii are supposed to have lived at the western end of the peninsula, in the area now known as Cornwall, and if the tribal name were correct it would be the ultimate source of the name of that present-day county.

The existence of this sub-tribe, clan or sept, is not mentioned in Ptolemy's 2nd-century Geography, as are many of the other Iron Age tribes in Britain. It has been inferred on the basis of a place-name listed in the Ravenna Cosmography of c. 700 CE as purocoronavis, which is considered to be a scribal error for durocornavis (or durocornovium), interpreted as meaning "the fortress of the Cornovii". The British tribal name Cornovii is also implied by its reflexes in Welsh Cernyw, Breton Kernev, and Cornish Kernow (all meaning 'Cornwall'), which Peter Schrijver argues probably derive from Common Brittonic *kornou̯(i̯)ī.

== Etymology ==
According to Ptolemy, there were two other tribes known as the Cornovii, one in the Midlands and another in the far north. It is on this basis that the name of this putative ancestor-tribe of Cornwall is inferred. Although the Brittonic name is clearly derived from the word *cornu-, which means "horn", opinions diverge over whether or not this refers to the shape of the land. Considering that Cornwall is at the end of a long tapering peninsula, many scholars have adopted this derivation for the south-western Cornovii. For instance, Graham Webster in The Cornovii (1991), which is primarily about the Midlands tribe, states that the horn derivation could apply as long as the geography was apparent, as it might have been to Roman surveyors in the first century, and Victor Watts in the Cambridge Dictionary of English Place-names (2010) interprets the name *Cornowii, a different spelling for Latinised Cornovii, as "the people of the horn".

Malcolm Todd, in The South West to AD 1000 (1987), discusses other etymologies that have been put forward, such as the name being a reference to dwellers in promontory forts, and an explanation hypothesised by Ann Ross in 1967 that the tribal names may be totemic cult-names referring to a "horned god" cult followed by the tribes, which Todd says may be cognate with the Gaulish Cernunnos or the unnamed horned god of the Brigantes.

In an attempt to explain the same tribal name being used in the Midlands and Cornwall, the historian John Morris put forward a theory in his work The Age of Arthur (1973) that the Cornovii from the West Midlands migrated to Cornwall about 460 AD. Morris suggested that a contingent was sent to Dumnonia to rule the land there and keep out the invading Irish, seeing that a similar situation had occurred in North Wales. Morris's theory is not generally accepted by modern scholarship: Philip Payton, in his book Cornwall: a history (2004), states "...the Morris thesis is not widely accepted by archaeologists and early historians, and we may safely conclude that the Cornovii located west of the Tamar were an indigenous people quite separate from their namesakes in the Midlands and Caithness."

The extreme western peninsula of Dumnonia came to be known as "Cernyw" in Welsh, "Kernow" in Cornish and "Kernev (Veur)" in Breton. The modern English name Cornwall arises from the Old English word for Brittonic-speakers, wealas, being suffixed onto a borrowed form of the Brittonic place-name.

The location of the Dumnonii in pre-Roman times

== History ==
Since the western Cornovii are only known from one inferred mention in antiquity, nothing is known for certain of their history. They were part of the Dumnonii, the tribe whose lands, known as Dumnonia, extended from Cornwall through Devon and included parts of Somerset and Dorset. For details of the people who lived in the area after the withdrawal of the Romans. After the passing of the Roman period they re-appeared in 430 AD as a sub-dukedom of Dumnonia until early in the 9th century. In 838 the Cornish in alliance with Vikings were defeated by the West Saxons at the Battle of Hingston Down. This was the last-recorded battle between the Cornish and Wessex, and resulted in the loss of Cornish independence.

=== Settlements ===
The Dumnonii had no known tribal centre, and although Ptolemy's Geography lists four places as Dumnonian poleis: Voliba, Tamara, Uxella and Isca Dumnoniorum (present-day Exeter), it is likely that he only listed Roman places, and not purely native settlements. Of these four, there has been speculation that Voliba might be a place in Cornwall, and Tamara is assumed to be on the River Tamar, now the border between Cornwall and Devon. In 2008 in the parish of Calstock the remains of a Roman fort was excavated, which is currently thought to be the most plausible location for Tamara.

Ptolemy's list is supplemented by the problematical Ravenna Cosmography, which lists sixteen names before Isca Dumnoniorum (which is listed as scadum namorum, showing some of the problems of this source) and which have therefore been assumed to be west of Exeter. Several have been identified as most likely in Devon, leaving purocoronavis (the source of the name Cornovii (Kournaovioi), as discussed above), and a few others that are so corrupt as to defy identification, such as Giano, Pilais and Vernalis, which may possibly refer to places within the lands occupied by the Cornovii.

=== Language ===
The pre-Roman inhabitants were speakers of a Celtic language that would later develop into the Brythonic language Cornish.

== See also ==
- List of ancient Celtic peoples and tribes

== Sources ==
- Rivet, A. L. F.; Smith, Colin (1979). The Place-names of Roman Britain. London: Batsford Ltd. pp. 324–5. ISBN 0-7134-2077-4.
- Todd, Malcolm (1987). The South West to AD 1000. A Regional History of England. Longman. ISBN 0-582-49274-2.
