= Segontiaci =

Tribe of Iron Age Britain

The Segontiaci were a tribe of Iron Age Britain in the first century BCE. They are known only from a brief mention in the writings of Julius Caesar. They may have been one of the four tribes of Kent, represented in Caesar by references to the "four kings of that region" and in the archaeological record by distinct pottery assemblages.

During Julius Caesar's second invasion of Britain in 54 BCE, following Caesar's military success and restoration of King Mandubracius to power over the Trinovantes, opposition to the Romans coalesced around the figure of Cassivellaunus which led to divided loyalties among the Britons, as Caesar records. Emissaries of five British tribes, including the Segontiaci (the others being the Ancalites, the Bibroci, the Cenimagni and the Cassi), arrived at the Roman camp to treat for peace, and agreed to reveal details of Cassivellaunus' stronghold. Caesar besieged him there and brought him to terms. When Caesar left Britain he took hostages from the Britons, although which tribes were compelled to give any is not specified.

Segontiaci means "people of the place of strength". There was a later Roman fort in north Wales called Segontium, but it is probably not the place referred to in the tribal name. Brittonic *seg-ontio-n meant "strong place", and might easily arise independently in different areas.

== See also ==
- Iron Age tribes in Britain
- Cantiaci
- Segontium
