= Cassi =

Tribe of Iron Age Britain

The Cassi were a tribe of Iron Age Britain in the first century BCE. They are known only from a brief mention in the writings of Julius Caesar. They may have been one of the four tribes of Kent, represented in Caesar by references to the "four kings of that region" and in the archaeological record by distinct pottery assemblages.

During Julius Caesar's second invasion of Britain in 54 BCE, following Caesar's military success and restoration of King Mandubracius to power over the Trinovantes, opposition to the Romans coalesced around the figure of Cassivellaunus which led to divided loyalties among the Britons, as Caesar records. Emissaries of five British tribes, including the Cassi (the others being the Ancalites, the Segontiaci, the Cenimagni and the Bibroci), arrived at the Roman camp to treat for peace, and agreed to reveal details of Cassivellaunus' stronghold. Caesar besieged him there and brought him to terms. When Caesar left Britain he took hostages from the Britons, although which tribes were compelled to give any is not specified.

The archaeologists Graham Webster and Barry Cunliffe both agree that nothing more is known about them, but it has been suggested that between Caesar's second invasion and the invasion of Claudius in AD 43 that the Cassi along with other tribes such as the Ancalites and Bibroci merged to form the Catuvellauni, and that Cassivellaunus may have been a member of the Cassi tribe.

== See also ==
- Iron Age tribes in Britain
- Cantiaci
- Catuvellauni
