= Ancalites =

The Ancalites were a tribe of Iron Age Britain in the first century BCE. They are known only from a brief mention in the writings of Julius Caesar. They may have been one of the four tribes of Kent, represented in Caesar by references to the "four kings of that region" and in the archaeological record by distinct pottery assemblages.

During Julius Caesar's second invasion of Britain in 54 BCE, following Caesar's military success and restoration of King Mandubracius to power over the Trinovantes, opposition to the Romans coalesced around the figure of Cassivellaunus which led to divided loyalties among the Britons, as Caesar records. Emissaries of five British tribes, including the Ancalites (the others being the Bibroci, the Segontiaci, the Cenimagni and the Cassi), arrived at the Roman camp to treat for peace, and agreed to reveal details of Cassivellaunus' stronghold. Caesar besieged him there and brought him to terms. When Caesar left Britain he took hostages from the Britons, although which tribes were compelled to give any is not specified.

Where exactly the Ancalites were based is not known. In the 16th century William Camden reported that "some doe thinke" the Ancalites inhabited the area around Henley, Oxfordshire, Ian Yarrow writes of them being a Berkshire tribe, and the Wiltshire tourist board claim them amongst Wiltshire's own ethnic ancestry, which would significantly increase their territory, but without archaeological evidence, none of this can be confirmed.

== See also ==
- Iron Age tribes in Britain
- Cantiaci
