= Quintus Atrius =

Roman military officer

Quintus Atrius was a Roman military officer involved in Julius Caesar's second expedition to Britain in 54 BC. He was left in charge of ten cohorts of infantry and 300 cavalry to guard the beach-head while Caesar began his march inland, but halted his commander's advance by sending him word that his ships had been damaged by a storm while riding at anchor off the shore.
