= Imanuentius =

Imanuentius is named in some manuscripts of Julius Caesar's De Bello Gallico as a king of the Trinovantes, the leading nation of south-eastern Britain at that time, who ruled before Caesar's second expedition to the island in 54 BC. Variant spellings include Inianuvetitius, Inianuvetutus and Imannuetitius. In other manuscripts this king's name is not given.

Imanuentius was killed by the warlord Cassivellaunus, and his son Mandubracius fled to the protection of Caesar in Gaul. Cassivellaunus then led the British defence against the Romans, but the Trinovantes betrayed the location of his fortress to Caesar, who proceeded to besiege him there. As part of the terms of Cassivellaunus's surrender, Mandubracius was installed as king of the Trinovantes, and Cassivellaunus undertook not to make war against him.

John Koch suggests that the original form of Imanuentius's name may have been *Mannuētios. He also suggests that the Welsh mythological figure Manawydan may derive from an earlier *Mannuētiagnos, "son of Mannuetios".
