= Iron Age tribes in Britain =

Celtic tribes

The main Iron Age tribes in Southern Britain

The names of the Celtic Iron Age tribes in Britain were recorded by Roman and Greek historians and geographers, especially Ptolemy. Information from the distribution of Celtic coins has also shed light on the extents of the territories of the various groups that occupied the island.

== Historiography ==
Available evidence seems to indicate that the tribes of the Middle Iron Age tended to group together into larger tribal kingdoms during the Late Iron Age.

The Belgae and Atrebates share their names with tribes in France and Belgium, which, together with Caesar's note that Diviciacus of the Suessiones had ruled territory in Britain, suggests that this part of the country might have been conquered and ruled from abroad. The Parisii have also been suggested as having been an immigrant group.

Some historians have suggested that it might be possible to distinguish the distributions of different tribes from their pottery assemblages for the Middle Iron Age. However, no names are available for these tribes (except perhaps "Pretanoi"), and most of the tribes apart from in the South did not use pottery to a significant enough extent for this methodology to be applied to them.

These are also not necessarily the names by which the tribes knew themselves; for instance, "Durotriges" can mean "hillfort-dwellers", referring to the fact that hillforts continued to be occupied in this area after they were abandoned elsewhere in Southern Britain. It is unlikely that the Durotriges themselves considered this their defining characteristic. Further, "Regnenses" is a Latin name meaning "inhabitants of the (client) kingdom".

== Tribes ==
The following ethnic names were recorded in the 2nd century at the earliest. The Iron Age had ended by this date, having transitioned into the Roman period. These tribes were not necessarily the same tribes that had been living in the same area during the Iron Age.

=== Southern Britain ===
- Atrebates
- Belgae
- Cantiaci
- Catuvellauni
- Dobunni
- Dumnonii, and sub-tribe Cornovii
- Durotriges
- Regnenses
- Trinovantes
- Iceni

=== Middle and western Britain ===
- Cornovii
- Corieltauvi
- Deceangli
- Demetae
- Gangani
- Ordovices
- Silures

=== Northern Britain ===
- Brigantes
- Caledonii
- Caereni
- Carnonacae
- Carvetii
- Corionototae
- Cornovii
- Creones
- Damnonii
- Decantae
- Epidii
- Gabrantovices
- Lopocares
- Lugi
- Novantae
- Parisi
- Selgovae
- Smertae
- Setantii
- Taexali
- Textoverdi
- Vacomagi
- Venicones
- Votadini

=== Miscellaneous (unknown) ===
- Ancalites
- Attacotti
- Bibroci
- Cassi
- Cenimagni (may be a variant word for the Iceni)
- Pretanoi (may refer to Britons as a whole or a singular tribe)
- Segontiaci

== See also ==
- Roman client kingdoms in Britain

== Bibliography ==
- Anon (1994). Historical Map and Guide Roman Britain (map). Ordnance Survey, Fourth Edition (Revised).
- Frere, S. (1987). Britannia. Routledge, London.
