= 118 BC =

118 BC in various calendars
- Gregorian calendar: 118 BC; CXVIII BC
- Ab urbe condita: 636
- Ancient Egypt era: XXXIII dynasty, 206
- Pharaoh: Ptolemy VIII Physcon, 28
- Ancient Greek Olympiad (summer): 165th Olympiad, year 3
- Assyrian calendar: 4633
- Balinese saka calendar: N/A
- Bengali calendar: −711 – −710
- Berber calendar: 833
- Buddhist calendar: 427
- Burmese calendar: −755
- Byzantine calendar: 5391–5392
- Chinese calendar: 壬戌年 (Water Dog); 2580 or 2373 — to — 癸亥年 (Water Pig); 2581 or 2374
- Coptic calendar: −401 – −400
- Discordian calendar: 1049
- Ethiopian calendar: −125 – −124
- Hebrew calendar: 3643–3644
- Hindu calendars
- Vikram Samvat: −61 – −60
- Shaka Samvat: N/A
- Kali Yuga: 2983–2984
- Holocene calendar: 9883
- Iranian calendar: 739 BP – 738 BP
- Islamic calendar: 762 BH – 761 BH
- Javanese calendar: N/A
- Julian calendar: N/A
- Korean calendar: 2216
- Minguo calendar: 2029 before ROC 民前2029年
- Nanakshahi calendar: −1585
- Seleucid era: 194/195 AG
- Thai solar calendar: 425–426
- Tibetan calendar: ཆུ་ཕོ་ཁྱི་ལོ་ (male Water-Dog); 9 or −372 or −1144 — to — ཆུ་མོ་ཕག་ལོ་ (female Water-Boar); 10 or −371 or −1143

Year 118 BC was a year of the pre-Julian Roman calendar. At the time it was known as the Year of the Consulship of Cato and Rex (or, less frequently, year 636 Ab urbe condita) and the Fifth Year of Yuanshou. The denomination 118 BC for this year has been used since the early medieval period, when the Anno Domini calendar era became the prevalent method in Europe for naming years.

== Events ==
=== By place ===
==== Roman Republic ====
- The Roman colony of Narbo Martius is founded in Gallia Transalpina.
- The Second Dalmatian War ends with victory for Rome. Lucius Caecilius Metellus assumes the surname Delmaticus.

==== Numidia ====
- Micipsa dies and Numidia, following the king's wish, is divided into three parts, a third each ruled by Micipsa's own sons, Adherbal and Hiempsal I, and the king's adopted son, Jugurtha.

==== China ====
- Emperor Wu of Han secretly executes his favourite necromancer Shao Weng for fraud.

== Births ==
- Lucius Licinius Lucullus, Roman consul (d. 56 BC)

== Deaths ==
- Marcus Porcius Cato, Roman consul and orator
- Micipsa, king of Numidia (approximate date)
