= Vodenos =

Vodenos or Vosenios was a king of the Cantiaci of south-eastern Britain, and is known only from coin legends. He seems to have succeeded Dubnovellaunus to the throne of the Cantiaci towards the end of the 1st century BC, although their reigns may have been contemporary or overlapped. He ruled until ca. 15 AD, and was succeeded by Eppillus, probably the former king of the Atrebates.
