= Itius Portus =

Ancient Roman sea port of uncertain location

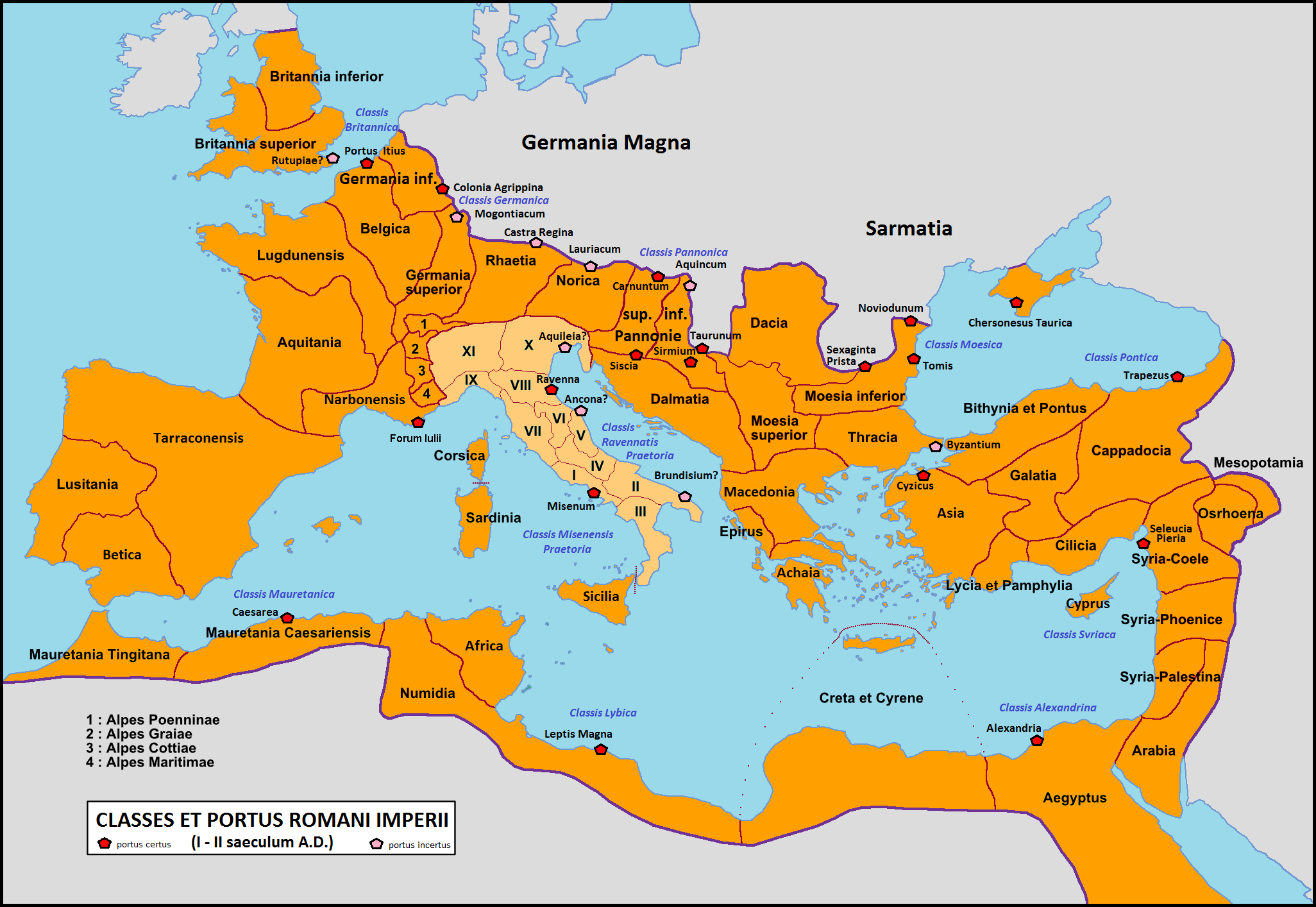
Map of the Roman fleets and major naval bases during the Principate

Itius Portus or Portus Itius was the ancient Roman name for a sea port on the English Channel in what is now Nord-Pas-de-Calais, France, though its precise location is unknown. The main candidates have been Saint-Omer (Sithiu), Wissant and Boulogne (more usually called Gesoriacum and later Bononia), but a silted-up lagoon on the Flanders shore behind Calais now seems a most likely speculated area.

== Caesar ==
Julius Caesar described calling ships ad portum Itium (used twice) to embark troops for his invasions of Britain in 54 BC.

The location of the port was near the uplands round Cap Gris Nez (Promunturium Itium), but the exact site has been disputed ever since the Renaissance. Many critics have assumed that Caesar used the same port for his first expedition, but the name does not appear at all in that connection. This fact, coupled with other considerations, might make it probable that the two expeditions started from different places. However, Strabo (Geography 4.5.2) mentions Itium in the context of Caesar's first crossing, so Caesar simply may not have named it in his own account of the first crossing.

It was once generally agreed that Caesar first embarked for Britain at Boulogne. The same view was widely held about the second crossing, but T. Rice Holmes in an article in the Classical Review (May 1909) gave strong reasons for preferring Wissant, 4 miles (6.4 km) east of Gris Nez. The chief reason is that Caesar, having found he could not set sail from the small harbour of Boulogne with even eighty ships simultaneously, decided that he must take another point for the sailing of the more than 800 ships of the second expedition. Holmes argues that, allowing for change in the foreshore since Caesar's time, 800 specially built ships could have been hauled above the highest spring-tide level, and afterwards launched simultaneously at Wissant, which would therefore have been commodissimus or opposed to brevissimus traiectus.

In fact, the logical place to assemble 800 or so ships would have been the large lagoon (where now there is farmland and a maze of drainage ditches) behind a coastal fringe of islands (where the modern ports of Calais and Dunkirk now sit), because in Caesar's day an estuary stretched from this location all the way inland to the site of the modern town of Saint-Omer. In 1944, French historian Albert Grenier, against the backdrop of the Allied invasion of Normandy, reanalysed Caesar's text against modern understanding of wind, weather, tides, and siltation in the English Channel. He concluded Caesar's departure ports were likely to be Saint-Omer. All would later become important Roman ports. The English side of the Channel also had many places that served as ports in the Roman era but are now far inland because of silting.

== Subsequent invasions ==
Caligula's abortive invasion of Britain c. AD 40 was probably to have departed from Boulogne. The Roman lighthouse which once stood there is believed to have been built by him.

Boulogne is likewise presumed to have been the point of departure for the conquest of Britain of AD 43 under Aulus Plautius, although the only surviving account of the invasion, that of Cassius Dio, does not mention it. The emperor Claudius followed later with reinforcements, and Suetonius tells us he sailed from Gesoriacum.
