= T. Rice Holmes =

British classical scholar (1855–1933)

T. R. E. Holmes FBA
- Portrait by Walter Stoneman, 1925
- Born: Thomas Rice Edward Holmes; 24 May 1855; Castletown-Geoghegan, Ireland
- Died: 4 August 1933 (aged 78); Roehampton, London, England
- Spouse: Isabel Isaacs (m. 1888)

Academic background
- Education: Merchant Taylors' School; Christ Church, Oxford

Academic work
- Notable works: Monographs on Julius Caesar

Thomas Rice Edward Holmes, FBA (24 May 1855 – 4 August 1933), who usually published his works under the names T. Rice Holmes or T. R. E. Holmes, was a scholar best known for his extensive and "fundamental" work on Julius Caesar and his Gallic War commentaries.

Holmes was born at Moycashel (today Castletown-Geoghegan), Ireland. He was the fifth son of Robert Holmes, a landed proprietor and a descendant of John Arbuthnot, a friend of Alexander Pope and Jonathan Swift.

Holmes was educated at Merchant Taylors' School and Christ Church, Oxford. He was assistant master at Lincoln Grammar School (1878–80), Blackheath Proprietary School (1880–85), and St. Paul's School (beginning in 1886). In 1888, he married Isabel Isaacs, the daughter of Lionel Isaacs of Mandeville, Jamaica. They lived at 11 Douro Place, Kensington.

In addition to his books, Holmes published a number of articles in the English Historical Review, Classical Quarterly, and other journals. He died at age 78 in Roehampton, London.

== Books ==
- A History of the Indian Mutiny (1888), Internet Archive and Google Books.
- Four Famous Soldiers (1889)
- Caesar's Conquest of Gaul: An Historical Narrative (1903), Internet Archive (part I only) and Internet Archive (part I only); review of revised second edition of 1911 by H. Stuart Jones, English Historical Review 27 (1912) at LacusCurtius.
- Ancient Britain and the Invasions of Julius Caesar (1907), Internet Archive and Internet Archive; review by H. Stuart Jones, English Historical Review 24 (1909) at LacusCurtius.
- as translator: Caesar's Commentaries on the Gallic War (1908)
- The Roman Republic and the Founder of the Empire (Oxford: Clarendon Press, 1928), Google Books

== Articles ==
Holmes wrote several articles, and Bill Thayer has documented "a flurry of argument and counter-argument" among Holmes and other scholars on the identity of the Portus Itius named by Caesar. These appear at LacusCurtius in hypertext editions:

- F.J. Haverfield, review of Holmes' Caesar's Conquest of Gaul (1899) and Camille Jullian's Vercingétorix (1901), English Historical Review 18 (1903) 332–336.
- T. Rice Holmes, "Last Words on Portus Itius," Classical Review 23 (May 1909) 77–81.
- H. Stuart Jones takes Holmes to task while reviewing Ancient Britain and the Invasions of Julius Caesar in English Historical Review 24 (1909) 115–116 and 604
- T. Rice Holmes, "An Explanation," Classical Review 26 (March 1912) 70.
- F.J. Haverfield, "Portius Itius," Classical Review 27 (December 1913) 258–260.
- T. Rice Holmes, "F.H. on Portius Itius," Classical Review 28 (March 1914) 45–47.
- F.J. Haverfield, "Portus Itius," Classical Review 28 (May 1914) 82–84.
- T. Rice Holmes, "Portus Itius," Classical Review 28 (September 1914) 193–196.
- E.E. Genner, "Portus Itius," Classical Review 32 (May 1918) 70.

Holmes' "The Battle-field of Old Pharsalus," Classical Quarterly 2 (1908) 271–292 is also republished at LacusCurtius.

== Biographical sources ==
- Nature 132 (2 September 1933) 342, obituary (partial text)
- Who's Who 1900 (London: Adam & Charles Black, 1900), vol. 52, p. 532 online.
