= Dubnovellaunus =

- King of the Cantiaci
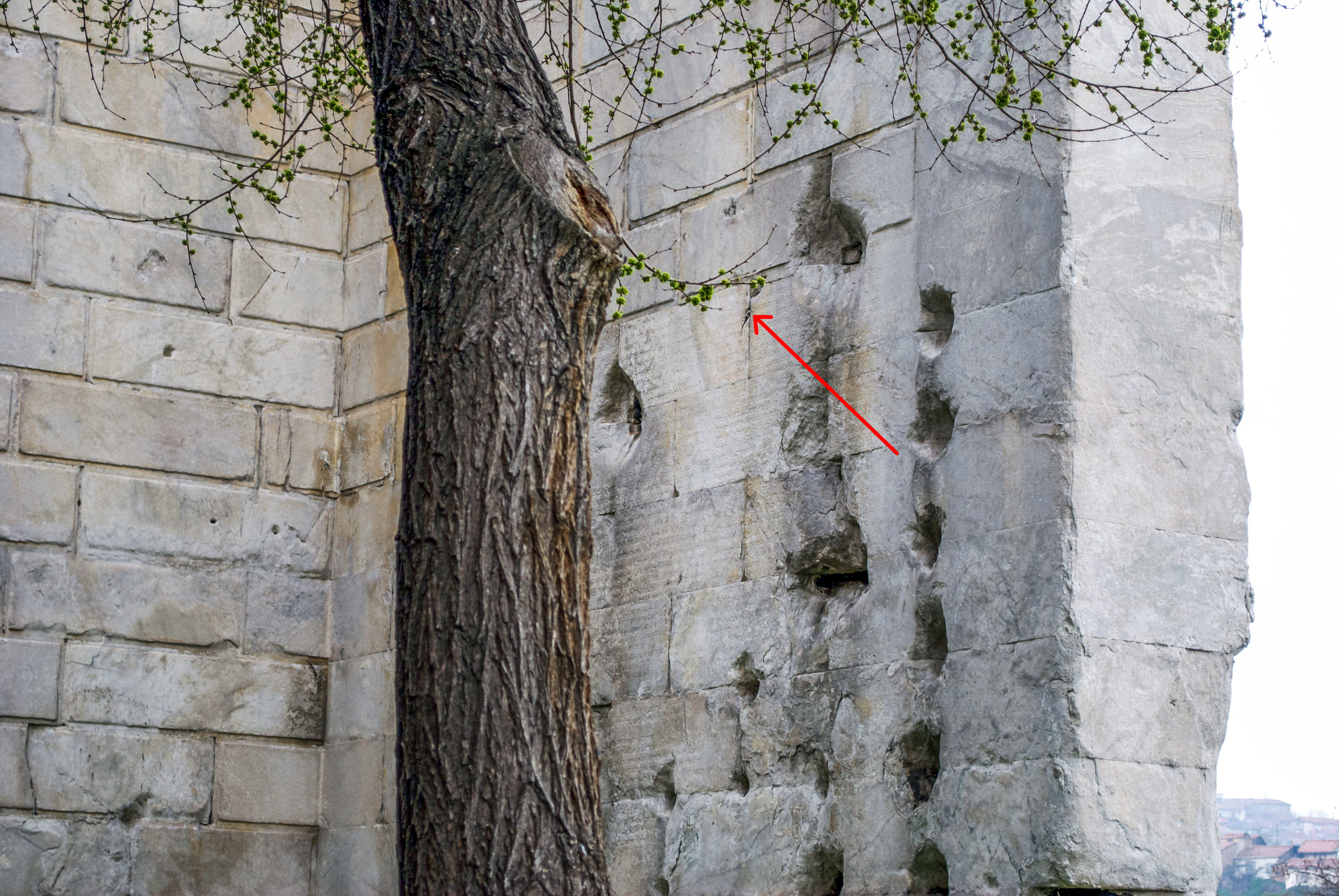
- South wall of the pronaos of the Temple of Augustus and Rome in Ankara, sporting the Monumentum Ancyranum of the Res Gestae Divi Augusti. The section relating to Dubnovellaunus is annotated.
- Successor: Vodenos

Dubnovellaunus or Dumnovellaunus was the name of at least one, and possibly several kings of south-eastern Britain in the late 1st century BC/early 1st century AD, known from coin legends and from a mention in the Res Gestae Divi Augusti.

- Dubnovellaunus is the name of a king who, based on coin distribution, appears to have ruled over Kent east of the River Medway. He was the first king of the Cantiaci to issue inscribed coins: some of his coins appear to date from as early as 40-30 BC. Towards the end of the 1st century BC he seems to have been succeeded by a king called Vodenos or Vosenios, although it is possible the two kings' reigns were contemporary or overlapped.
- A king called Dubnovellaunus succeeded his father Addedomarus as king of the Trinovantes ca. 10-5 BC and ruled for several years before being supplanted by Cunobelinus of the Catuvellauni.
- In the Res Gestae Divi Augusti, a British king called Dumnovellaunus appears, alongside Tincomarus of the Atrebates, as a supplicant to Augustus around AD 7.
- Another Dumnovellaunus appears on coins of the Corieltauvi, dating ca. 45 AD. He appears to have been a subordinate king to Volisios, probably the overall king of the territory.

Given the chronology it is possible, but not certain, that Dubnovellaunus of the Cantiaci is the same individual as Dubnovellaunus of the Trinovantes; and the Trinovantian Dubnovellaunus is most likely to be the Dumnovellaunus who presented himself to Augustus.
