= Addedomaros =

1st-century BCE British king

- King of the Trinovantes/South-Eastern Britain
- Reign: c. 25–10 BC
- Predecessor: Mandubracius?
- Successor: Dubnovellaunus Tasciovanus
- Died: c. 10 BC
- Issue: Antedios?
- Father: Mandubracius?

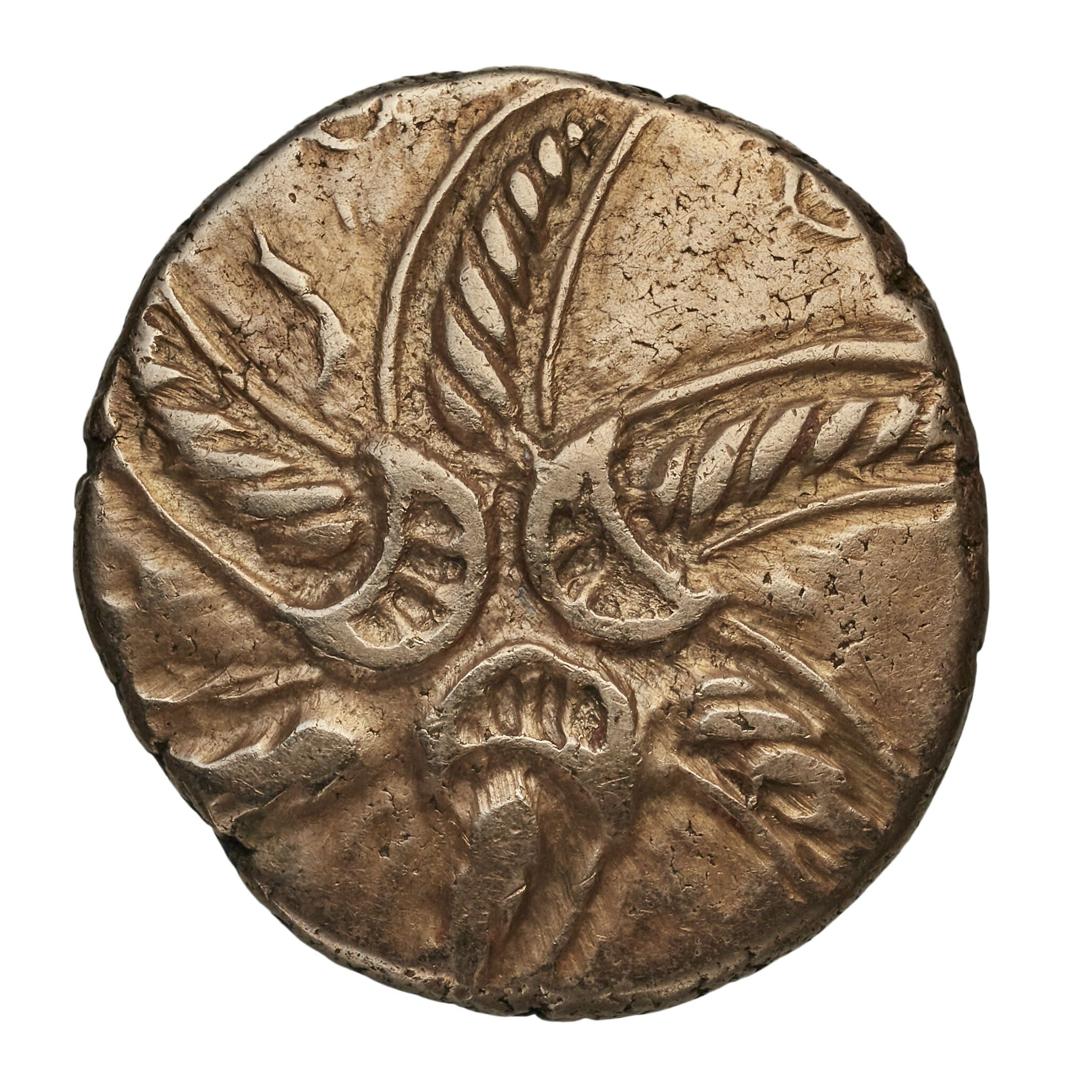
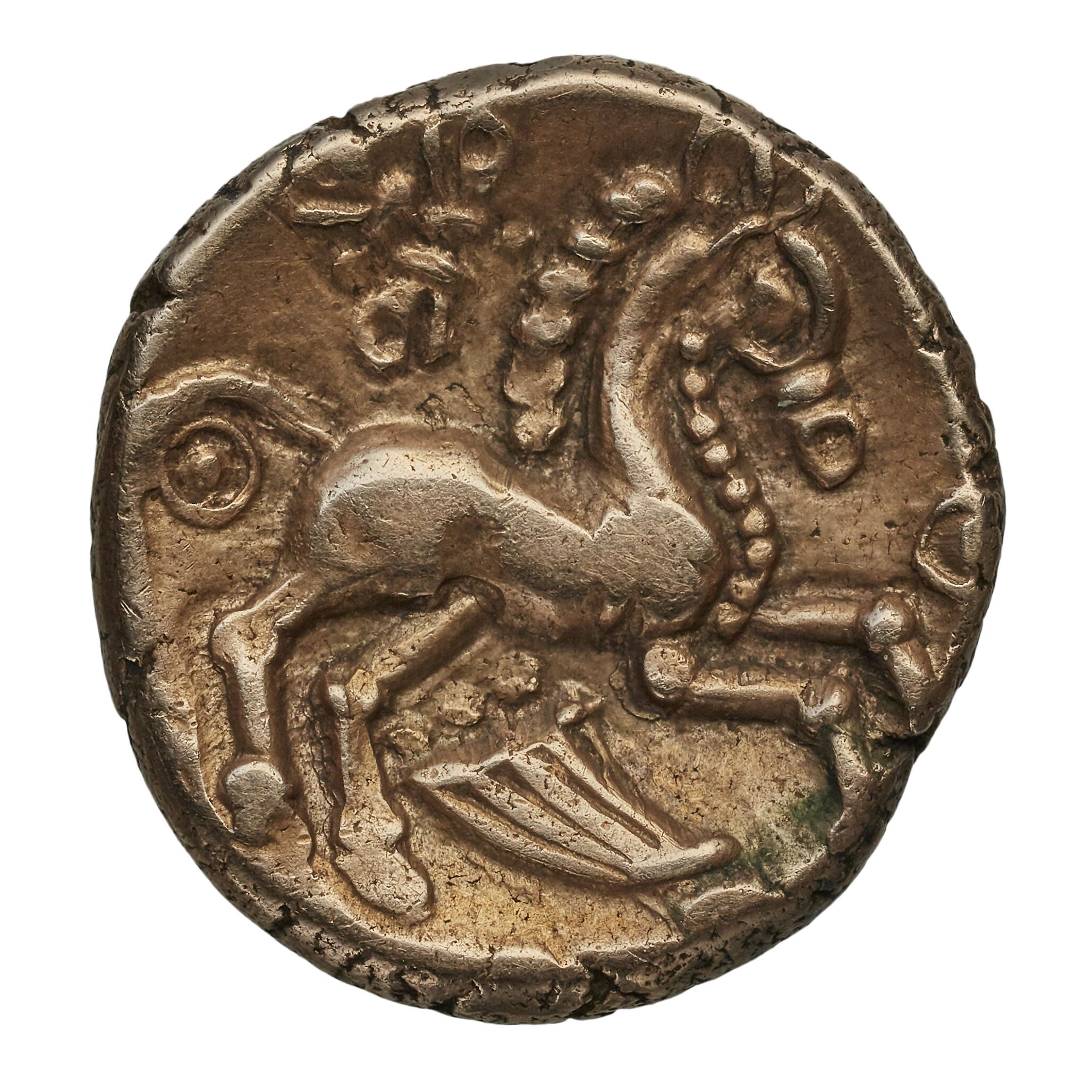
Gold stater of Addedomaros

Addedomaros (on his coins written as AθθEDOMAROS or AĐĐEDOMAROS, or minor variants and abbreviations of these) was a king in south-eastern Britain in the late 1st century BC. He is known only from his inscribed coins, the distribution of which seem to indicate that he was the ruler of the Trinovantes, and later of the Catuvellauni as well.

== Coins ==
He was the first king to produce inscribed coins north of the Thames. They bear his name, but no record of the date or site of the mint. Careful study of the artistic and manufacturing sequences has given indicators of relative timing. They may have been produced as early as 45 BC, although some estimates are as late as 10 BC. They include three classes of gold staters, quarter staters, and both silver and bronze issues.

== Rise and fall of power ==
=== Heartland of power ===
His silver and bronze is found only in modern Essex and the eastern half of Hertfordshire, with a few in Suffolk; this area may have been the original area of Addedomaros's power. His earliest staters are derived from the "Essex Banded" type, and they in turn from the uninscribed gold of the Cantii. He may have been the ruler of a colony from Kent, which had earlier issued the "Essex Banded" staters. His silver and bronze has not been found from Camulodunum, nor close to it.

=== Later extended distribution ===
The gold is more widely distributed. Class 1 extends further westward, into the areas ascribed to the Catuvellauni and Trinovantes, with a group around modern Aylesbury. Class 2 has a similar distribution. Class 3, however, has been found as far west as Oxfordshire, and may indicate the height of Addedomaros's power over previously Catuvellaunian territory.

=== Last phase of authority ===
There are three major hoards of his gold staters; one contains coins from all three of the classes issued, one contains only classes 2 and 3, and one is of class 3 only. In all three hoards, Class 3 is the great majority of the coins, and Class 3 thus makes up the great majority of Addedomaros's known staters. Class 3 staters were produced rapidly, in large numbers, using increasingly slipshod methods. These hoards may mark Addedomaros's dwindling power at the end of his reign, with Class 3 possibly being struck mainly to be paid as tribute.

He was succeeded by Tasciovanus in the western part of his kingdom and Dubnovellaunus in the east, neither of whom claim descent from him on their coins.

The Lexden Tumulus on the outskirts of Colchester has been suggested as his tomb.

The Welsh Triads recall Aedd Mawr as one of the founders of Britain.
