= Quintus Laberius Durus =

1st-century Roman military tribune

Quintus Laberius Durus (died August 54 BC) was a Roman military tribune who died during Julius Caesar's second expedition to Britain. Caesar describes how soon after landing in Kent, the Romans were attacked whilst building a camp by the native Britons. Before reinforcements could arrive, Laberius was killed. His burial site is traditionally the earthworks of Julliberrie's Grave near Chilham (which is in fact a Neolithic long barrow).

Orosius, in his Seven Books of History Against the Pagans, calls him Labienus, confusing him with Caesar's legate Titus Labienus, who lived to fight against Caesar in the Civil War. The error was perpetuated by Bede and Geoffrey of Monmouth, both of whom refer to a tribune called Labienus being killed in Britain. The latter says he was killed by Nennius.

Despite his status as a footnote in history, a long modern poem by American poet Gabriel Gudding is dedicated to Laberius ("For Quintus Laberius Durus, Who, Because of a Javelin in His Lungs, Died Near Kent, in Early August, 54 B.C") and appears in his book, A Defense of Poetry (the University of Pittsburgh Press, 2002). A historical novel, Caesar (Harper, 1999), by Australian writer Colleen McCullough, also involves him.
