= Jasper Fisher =

English divine and dramatist

Jasper Fisher (fl. 1639), was an English divine and dramatist.

== Life ==
Fisher was born in 1591, the son of William Fisher of Carleton, Bedfordshire, deputy-auditor for the county of York (descended from a Warwickshire family), by Alice Roane of Wellingborough. Fisher matriculated at Magdalen Hall, Oxford, 13 November 1607; he was admitted B.A. 28 January 1610-11, M.A. 27 January 1613-14, B.D. and D.D. 1639. Fisher held at Magdalen College the post of divinity or philosophy reader (Wood).

The exact date of Fisher's death is 1643. According to Oldys's manuscript notes to Gerard Langbaine he became blind, whether from old age or an accident is not known. He married Elizabeth, daughter of the Rev. William Sams of Burstead, Essex. Gideon Fisher, who went to Oxford in 1634 and succeeded to the estate at Carleton, was the son, not of Jasper, but of Jasper's elder brother Gideon

== Works ==
About 1631 (according to Anthony Wood) he became rector of Wilden, Bedfordshire, and in 1633 published his one considerable work, a play, entitled Fuimus Troes, the True Trojans, being a story of the Britaines valour at the Romanes first invasion. Publickly presented by the gentlemen students of Magdalen College in Oxford, London, 1633, 4to. The drama is written in blank verse, interspersed with lyrics; Druids, poets, and a harper are introduced, and it ends with a masque and chorus. He also published some sermons, one on Malachi 2 v. 7, 1636, and 'The Priest's Duty and Dignity, preached at the Triennial Visitation in Ampthill 18 August 1635, by J. F., presbyter and rector of Wilden in Bedfordshire, and published by command,' London, 1636.
