= Bigbury Camp =

Hillfort in Kent, England

Coordinates: 51.27791°N 1.03253°E

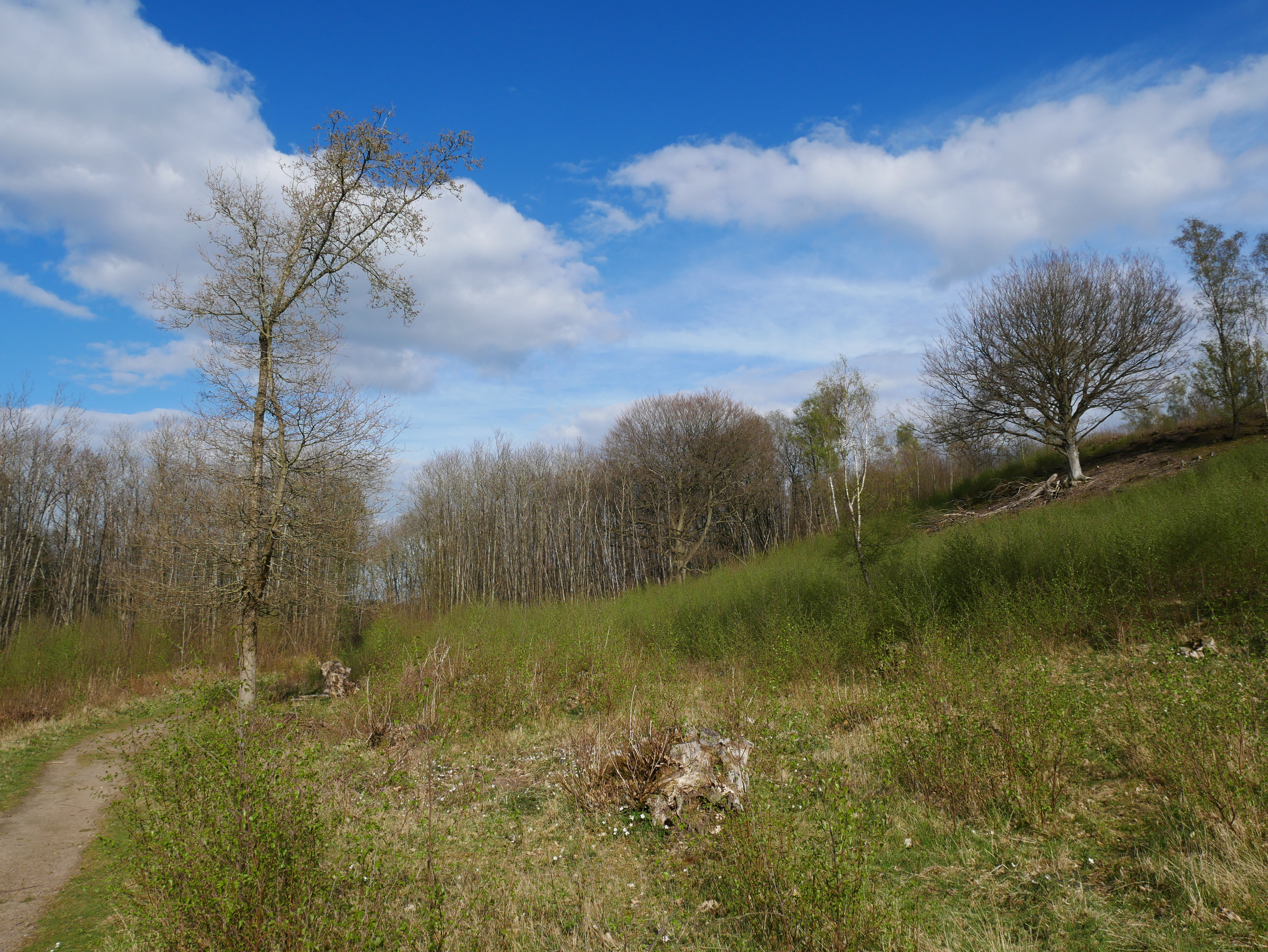
The northeast slope of Bigbury Camp

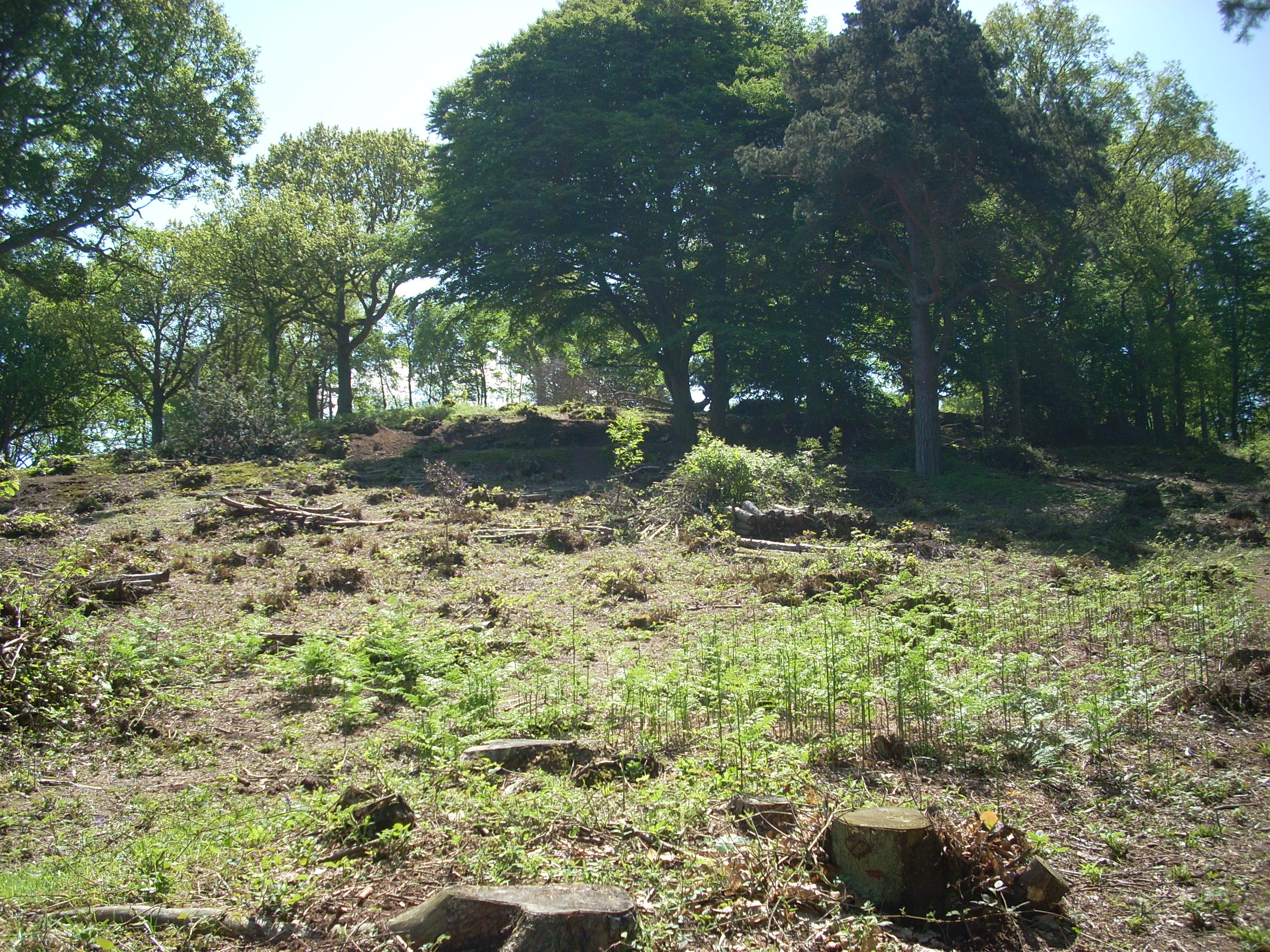
Bigbury Camp viewed from within the northern enclosure

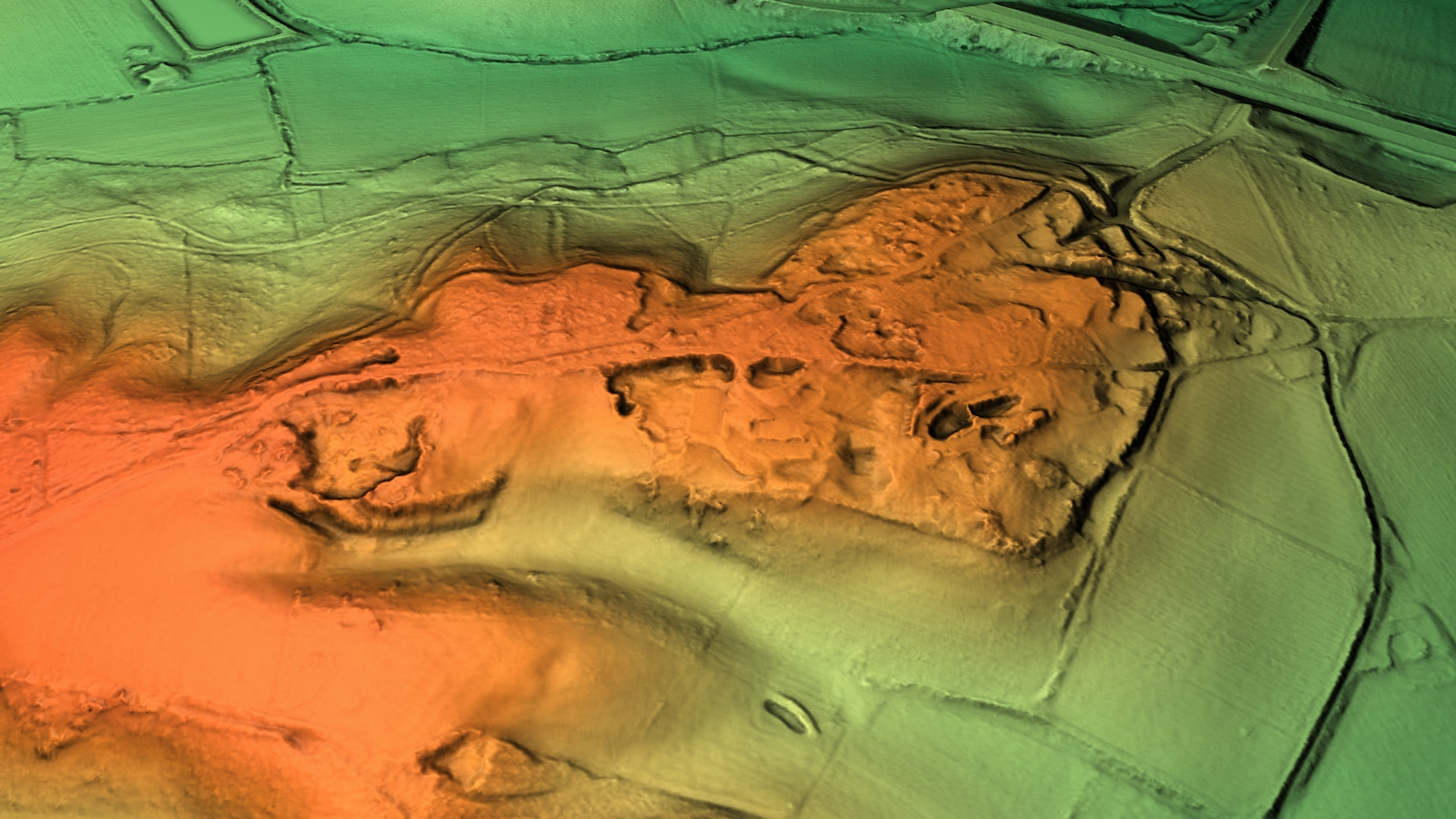
3D view of the digital terrain model

Bigbury Camp (formerly Bigberry Camp) is a univallate hill fort in the parish of Harbledown and Rough Common in Kent in England. The fort is a Scheduled Ancient Monument, with a list entry identification number of 1005169. Bigbury Camp is the only confirmed Iron Age hill fort in east Kent. It is managed by Kent Wildlife Trust.

Bigbury Camp was occupied from about 350 BC and may have been stormed by Roman soldiers of the Legio VII Claudia under the command of Julius Caesar.

== Location ==
Bigbury Camp is located on a hill 3.2 kilometres (2.0 mi) west of Canterbury and is situated on a minor road between the A2 and A28 roads, southwest of Harbledown. The site is crossed east-west by the North Downs Way long distance footpath and by the Pilgrims' Way, which follow the same course at this point.

== Physical characteristics ==
The fort covers an area of 10.7 hectares (26 acres), including a northern annex covering 3.2 hectares (7.9 acres) that may have been a cattle enclosure. The fort has a single 4.8-metre (16 ft) wide defensive ditch with a raised bank on the inner side and a lower counterscarp bank. The ramparts form an irregular shape following the contour of the hill at an altitude of 60 metres (200 ft) above mean sea level. Excavations in the early 1960s revealed the presence of large post-holes in the bottom of the defensive ditch, which have been interpreted as evidence of a strong pallisade running along the ditch bottom.

The fort had two entrances, one on the east side and one on the west. The east entrance is now passed by a modern road; it was defended with a staggered fortification consisting of two ditches and a bank.

== Finds ==
Bigbury Camp has been the focus of a significant amount of archaeological study. Digging at Bigbury has unearthed a number of iron artefacts including agricultural tools and kitchen utensils. In 1861, gravel diggers unearthed a quantity of corroded ironwork consisting of the remains of rods, rings and hooks together with triangular bricks arranged in a circle that displayed evidence of burning.

At the time this was interpreted as a Roman-style hearth that had consisted of three iron legs supporting hooks and rings from which would have been suspended a cauldron. The total height of the apparatus would have been approximately 1.5 metres (5 ft). A flint arrowhead was found nearby. The gravel diggers also found a large iron knife measuring 27 centimetres (10.5 in), including the tang. Parts of a horse's bridle were also recovered, including a snaffle bit with 8.3-centimetre (3.25 in) wide bridle rings.

A notable find at Bigbury was a slave chain with its lock, associated with the pre-Roman slave trade between Britain and Gaul. Parts of an iron wheel rim were found, together with early Iron Age pottery. Taken together, the finds indicate the presence of a prosperous agricultural community at Bigbury during the Iron Age. Late Iron Age finds include good quality wheel-turned Aylesford-Swarling pottery. In spite of extensive investigation, no Iron Age coins have been recovered from Bigbury Camp; this has led investigator W. Rodwell to conclude that it was not significant as a permanent settlement. Artefacts recovered from Bigbury Camp are on display at museums in Canterbury and Maidstone.

== History ==
The site had experienced a long period of occupation during the Iron Age before the arrival of the Romans. The hill fort appears to have been first occupied around 350 BC, although the ditch-and-rampart defences were not built until the 2nd century BC. It is likely that Bigbury Camp was the British fortress that was attacked by the Roman Seventh Legion in 54 BC.

Julius Caesar described how the entrances to the fort were barricaded with felled trees. The site was abandoned around this time, perhaps as a result of Caesar's attack, and the focus of settlement was transferred eastwards to Canterbury, which appears to have been deliberately founded to replace it.

=== Modern history ===
Preliminary archaeological excavations took place in 1933, during which two large trenches were cut across the north side of the main rampart.
