= Lugotorix =

Lugotorix was a British chieftain who was captured after a failed attack by the four kings of Kent on Julius Caesar's naval camp in 54 BC. His name may mean "mouse-king".
