= Cornovii (Caithness) =

People of ancient Britain

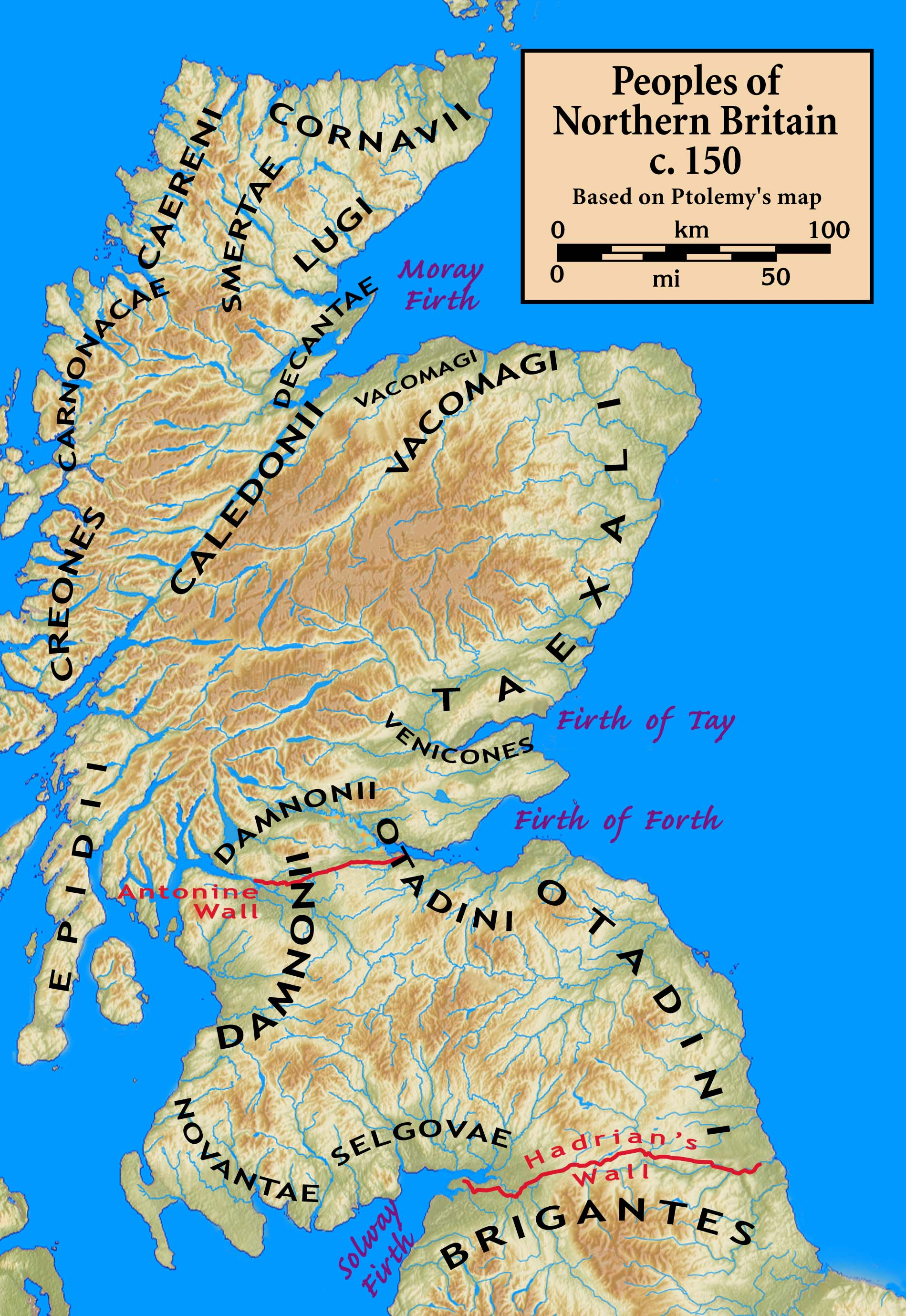

The Cornovii were a people of ancient Britain, known only from a single mention of them by the geographer Ptolemy c. 150. From his description, their territory is reliably known to have been at the northern tip of Scotland, in Caithness. Ptolemy does not provide them with a town or principal place.

== See also ==
- Cornovii for a discussion of the possible etymology of the tribal name
