= Cassivellaunus =

- King of the Catuvellauni
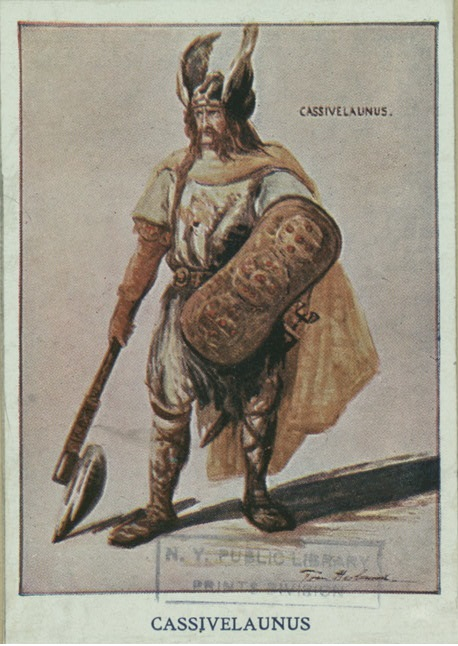
- A representation of Cassivellaunus, New York Public Library
- Predecessor: Unknown
- Successor: Tasciovanus
- Born: Britain
- Died: Britain
- Burial: Unknown (In legend: York)
- Occupation: Chief commander of the British resistance during Caesar's second invasion of Britain

Cassivellaunus was a historical British military leader who led the defence against Julius Caesar's second expedition to Britain in 54 BC. He led an alliance of tribes against Roman forces, but eventually surrendered after his location was revealed to Julius Caesar by defeated Britons.

Cassivellaunus made an impact on the British consciousness. He appears in British legend as Cassibelanus, one of Geoffrey of Monmouth's kings of the Britons, and in the Mabinogi, Brut y Brenhinedd and the Welsh Triads as Caswallawn, son of Beli Mawr.

== Name ==
The Common Brittonic personal name Cassiuellaunos stems from the word uellaunos ('chief, commandant'). The meaning of the prefix cassi- has been debated, but it possibly signifies 'tin, bronze'. Cassivellaunus may thus been translated as 'Chief-of-Tin', that is to say 'the inflexible'. The personal name Ver-cassivellaunus ('True-Chief-of-Tin') is related.

== History ==
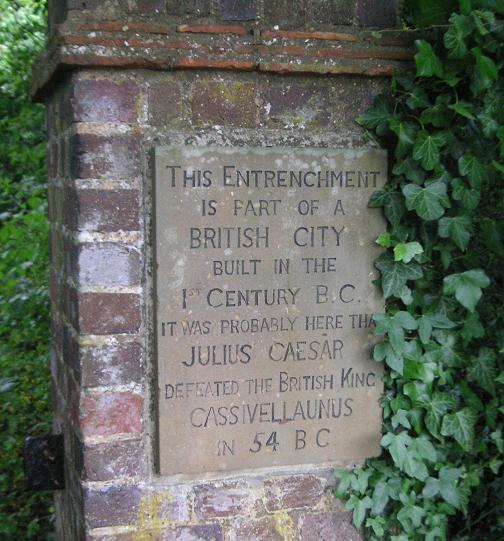
A plaque in Devil's Dyke, Hertfordshire mentions Cassivellaunus

Cassivellaunus appears in Julius Caesar's Commentarii de Bello Gallico, having been given command of the combined British forces opposing Caesar's second invasion of Britain. Caesar does not mention Cassivellaunus's tribe, but his territory, north of the River Thames, corresponds with that inhabited by the tribe named the Catuvellauni at the time of the later invasion under Claudius.

Caesar tells us that Cassivellaunus had previously been in near-constant conflict with his neighbours, as was typical of the British tribes in this period, and had recently brought down the king of the Trinovantes, the most powerful tribe in Britain at the time. The king's son, Mandubracius, fled to Caesar in Gaul. Despite Cassivellaunus's harrying tactics, designed to prevent Caesar's army from foraging and plundering for food, Caesar advanced to the Thames. The only fordable point was defended and fortified with sharp stakes, but the Romans managed to cross it. Cassivellaunus dismissed most of his army and resorted to guerilla tactics, relying on his knowledge of the territory and the speed of his chariots.

Five British tribes, the Cenimagni, the Segontiaci, the Ancalites, the Bibroci and the Cassi, surrendered to Caesar and revealed the location of Cassivellaunus's stronghold. (Possible sites include Hexton and the Devil's Dyke, Wheathampstead.) Caesar proceeded to put the stronghold under siege. Cassivellaunus managed to get a message to the four kings of Kent, Cingetorix, Carvilius, Taximagulus and Segovax, to gather their forces and attack the Roman camp on the coast, but the Romans defended themselves successfully, capturing a chieftain called Lugotorix. On hearing of the defeat and the devastation of his territories, Cassivellaunus surrendered. The terms were mediated by Commius, Caesar's Gallic ally. Hostages were given and a tribute agreed. Mandubracius was restored to the kingship of the Trinovantes, and Cassivellaunus undertook not to wage war against him. All this achieved, Caesar returned to Gaul where a poor harvest had caused unrest. The Roman legions did not return to Britain for another 97 years.

The Greek author Polyaenus relates an anecdote in his Stratagemata that Caesar overcame Cassivellaunus's defence of a river crossing by means of an armoured elephant. This claim may derive from a confusion with the Roman conquest of 43 AD, when Claudius is supposed to have brought elephants to Britain.

== Legend ==
=== Historia Regum Britanniae ===
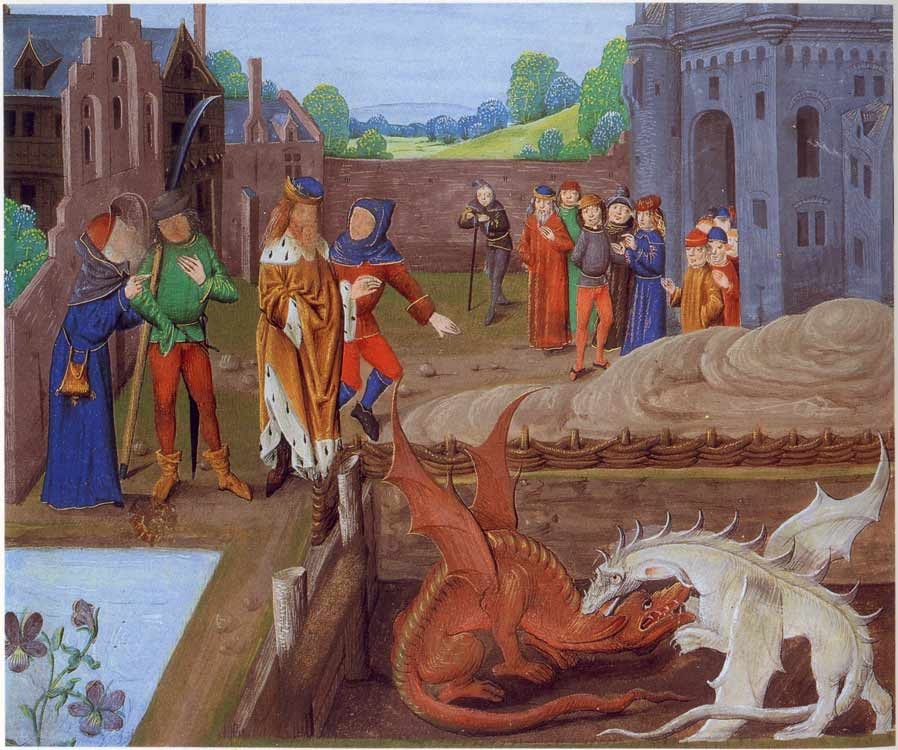
Illustration from Historia Regum Britanniae, featuring a red and a white dragon. The book describes the history of the kings of Britain

Cassivellaunus appears in Geoffrey of Monmouth's 12th-century work Historia Regum Britanniae (History of the Kings of Britain), usually spelled Cassibelanus or Cassibelaunus. The younger son of the former king Heli, he becomes king of Britain upon the death of his elder brother Lud, whose own sons Androgeus and Tenvantius are not yet of age. In recompense, Androgeus is made Duke of Kent and Trinovantum (London), and Tenvantius is made Duke of Cornwall.

After his conquest of Gaul, Julius Caesar sets his sights on Britain, and sends a letter to Cassibelanus demanding tribute. Cassibelanus refuses, citing the Britons' and Romans' common Trojan descent (see Brutus of Troy), and Caesar invades at the Thames Estuary. During the fighting, Cassibelanus's brother Nennius encounters Caesar and sustains a severe head wound. Caesar's sword gets stuck in Nennius's shield, and when the two are separated in the mêlée, Nennius throws away his own sword and attacks the Romans with Caesar's, killing many, including the tribune Labienus. The Britons hold firm, and that night Caesar flees back to Gaul. Cassibelanus's celebrations are muted by Nennius's death from his head wound. He is buried with the sword he took from Caesar, which is named Crocea Mors (Yellow Death).

Two years later, Caesar invades again with a larger force. Cassibelanus, forewarned, had planted stakes beneath the waterline of the Thames which gut Caesar's ships, drowning thousands of men. The Romans are once again quickly put to flight.

The leaders of the Britons gather in Trinovantum to thank the gods for their victory with many animal sacrifices, and celebrate with sporting events. During a wrestling bout, Cassibelanus's nephew Hirelglas is killed by Androgeus's nephew Cuelinus. Cassibelanus demands that Androgeus turn his nephew over to him for trial, but Androgeus refuses, insisting he should be tried in his own court in Trinovantum. Cassibelanus threatens war, and Androgeus appeals to Caesar for help, agreeing to accept him as liege and sending his son as a hostage.

Caesar invades a third time, landing at Richborough in Kent. As Cassibelaunus's army meets Caesar's, Androgeus attacks Cassibelaunus from the rear with five thousand men. His line broken, Cassibelanus retreats to a nearby hilltop. After two days’ siege, Androgeus appeals to Caesar to offer terms. Cassibelanus agrees to pay tribute of three thousand pounds of silver, and he and Caesar become friends.

Six years later, Cassibelanus dies and is buried in York. Androgeus has gone to Rome with Caesar, so Tenvantius succeeds as king of Britain.

=== Welsh literature ===
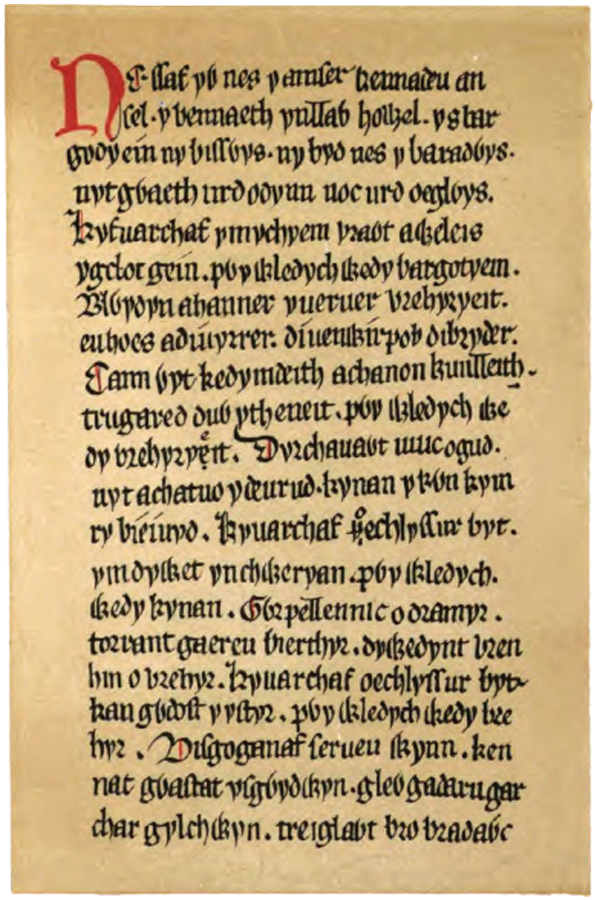
Red Book of Hergest, part of the Welsh Triads, in which Cassivellaunus is featured

Cassivellaunus appears as Caswallawn, son of Beli Mawr, in the Welsh Triads, the Mabinogion, and the Welsh versions of Geoffrey's Historia Regum Britanniae known as Brut y Brenhinedd. In the Second Branch of the Mabinogi, he appears as a usurper, who seizes the throne of Britain while the rightful king, Bran the Blessed, is at war in Ireland. Using a magic cloak which renders him invisible, he kills six of the seven stewards Bran has left in charge, while the seventh, Bran's son Caradog, dies of despair at the sight of a disembodied sword killing his men. He then appears in the Third Branch, in which Bran's followers offer their submission to him to avoid fighting. He is also mentioned in the tale Lludd and Llefelys, which features his two brothers Lludd Llaw Eraint (Geoffrey's Lud) and Llefelys.

Caswallawn is referenced frequently in the Welsh Triads. Triad 51 describes his conflict with "Afarwy" (Mandubracius/Androgeus) as described in Geoffrey of Monmouth, while Triad 95 references the story of Caradawg son of Bran's death as told in the Mabinogion. However, other triads (35, 36, 38, 59, 67, and 71) refer to a tradition about Caswallawn not drawn from either Roman nor existing medieval sources. Triad 38 names his horse as Meinlas ("Slender Gray") and calls him one of the Three Bestowed Horses of the Island of Britain; this is echoed in Triad 59, in which the decision to allow the Romans to land in Britain in exchange for Meinlas is called one of the Three Unfortunate Counsels of the Island of Britain. Triad 35 indicates that Caswallawn left Britain with 21,000 men in pursuit of Caesar and never returned.

Triads 67 and 71 portray Caswallawn as a great lover, who competed with Caesar over the beautiful Fflur. He is named as one of the Three Golden Shoemakers of the Island of Britain in relation to his trip to Rome seeking his love; context suggests he disguised himself as a shoemaker. A later collection of triads compiled by the 18th-century Welsh antiquarian Iolo Morganwg gives an expanded version of this tradition, including the details that Caswallawn had abducted Fflur from Caesar in Gaul, killing 6,000 Romans, and that Caesar invaded Britain in response. As with the rest of Morganwg's Triads, however, the provenance of these references is suspect. However, the 12th-century poet Cynddelw Brydydd Mawr knew of some version of the Fflur story, writing that Caesar's love for her was costly.

Welsh scholar Rachel Bromwich suggests the fragmentary allusions to Caswallawn in the Triads relate to a narrative of the character that has been lost. This may have been in the form of a romance detailing the king's adventures, but would have been largely uninfluenced by the classical accounts.

== Notes ==
Regnal titles
Unknown	King of the Catuvellauni	Succeeded by Tasciovanus
Legendary titles
Preceded by Lud	King of Britain	Succeeded by Tenvantius
