= Trinovantes =

Celtic tribe between modern-day Anglia and the Thames Estuary

Trinovantes; Trinobantes

Geography
- Capital: Camulodunon (Colchester)
- Location: Essex; South Suffolk; Hertfordshire
- Rulers: Imanuentius(?); Mandubracius; Addedomaros; Dubnovellaunus; Cunobelinus

The Trinovantes or Trinobantes were one of the Celtic tribes of Pre-Roman Britain. Their territory was on the north side of the Thames estuary in current Essex, Hertfordshire and Suffolk, and included lands now located in Greater London. They were bordered to the north by the Iceni, and to the west by the Catuvellauni. Their name possibly derives from the Celtic intensive prefix "tri-" and a second element, "nowio" (“new”), so meaning "very new" in the sense of "newcomers", but possibly with an applied sense of vigor or liveliness ultimately meaning "the very vigorous people". Their capital was Camulodunum (modern Colchester), one proposed site of the legendary Camelot.

== History ==
Shortly before Julius Caesar's invasion of Britain in 55 and 54 BC, the Trinovantes were considered the most powerful tribe in Britain. At this time their capital was probably at Braughing (in modern-day Hertfordshire). In some manuscripts of Caesar's Gallic War their king is referred to as Imanuentius, although in other manuscripts no name is given. Some time before Caesar's second expedition this king was overthrown by Cassivellaunus, who is usually assumed to have belonged to the Catuvellauni. Imanuentius's son, Mandubracius, fled to the protection of Caesar in Gaul. During his second expedition Caesar defeated Cassivellaunus and restored Mandubracius to the kingship, and Cassivellaunus undertook not to molest him again. Tribute was also agreed.

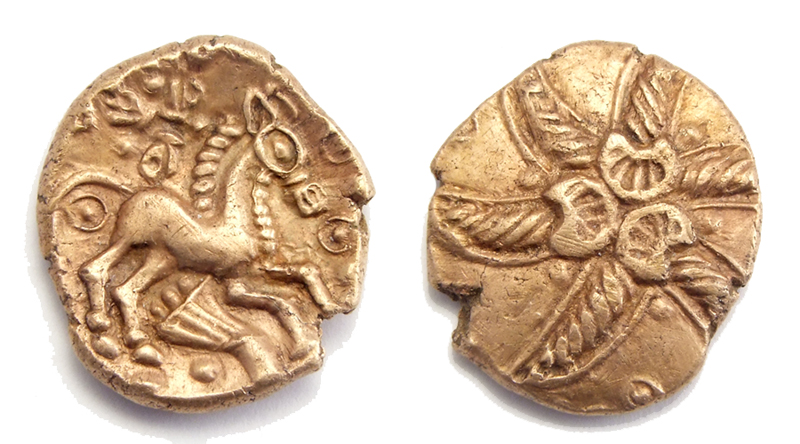
Trinovantes, gold stater, spiral type

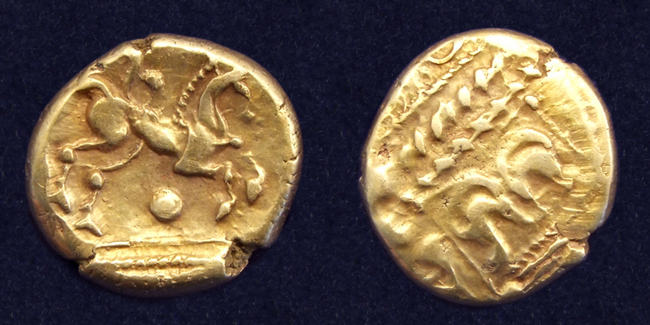
Trinovantes, gold stater, Whaddon Chase type

The next identifiable king of the Trinovantes, known from numismatic evidence, was Addedomarus, who took power c. 20–15 BC and moved the tribe's capital to Camulodunum. For a brief period c. 10 BC Tasciovanus of the Catuvellauni issued coins from Camulodunum, suggesting that he conquered the Trinovantes, but he was soon forced to withdraw, perhaps as a result of pressure from the Romans (hence the absence on his later coins of the mark "Rex”), and Addedomarus was restored. Addedomarus was briefly succeeded by his son Dubnovellaunus c. 10–5 BC, but a few years later the tribe was finally conquered by either Tasciovanus or his son Cunobelinus.

The Trinovantes reappeared in history when they participated in Boudica's revolt against the Roman Empire in 60 AD. Their name was given to one of the civitates of Roman Britain, whose chief town was Caesaromagus (modern Chelmsford, Essex). The style of their rich burials (see facies of Aylesford) is of continental origin and evidence of their affiliation to the Belgic people.

== Mythology ==
The kings of the Trinovantes are important figures in Welsh mythology and as important antecedents in the genealogies of medieval Welsh kings. Dubnovellaunus and Mandubracius appear as Dyfnwal Moelmud (Dubnovellaunus the Bald and Silent) and Manawydan, while the Welsh Triads recall Addedomarus as Aedd Mawr (Addedo the Great), traditionally one of the founders of Britain.

In the Historia Regum Britanniae, Geoffrey of Monmouth claimed that the Trinovantes took their name from Trinovantum ("New Troy"), which he states was the original name for London. Geoffrey connects the city with Brutus, another legendary founder of Britain.

== Popular culture ==
In Chelmsford 123, a British television situation comedy produced for Channel 4 by Hat Trick Productions, the main character of Badvoc (played by Rory McGrath) was the leader of the Trinovantes.

In Imperator: Rome, the Trinovantes appear as a playable tribe in southeastern Britain.

== Bibliography ==
- Julius Caesar, De Bello Gallico
- Caesar Augustus, Res Gestae Divi Augusti
- Tacitus, Annals
- Geoffrey of Monmouth, Historia Regum Britanniae
