= Mandubracius =

Celtic king of the Trinovantes

Mandubracius or Mandubratius was a king of the Trinovantes of south-eastern Britain in the 1st century BC.

== History ==
Mandubracius was the son of a Trinovantian king, named Imanuentius in some manuscripts of Julius Caesar's De Bello Gallico, who was overthrown and killed by the warlord Cassivellaunus some time before Caesar's second expedition to Britain in 54 BC. Mandubracius fled to the protection of Caesar in Gaul. Cassivellaunus then led the British defence against the Romans, but the Trinovantes betrayed the location of his fortress to Caesar, who proceeded to besiege him there. As part of the terms of Cassivellaunus's surrender, Mandubracius was installed as king of the Trinovantes, and Cassivellaunus undertook not to make war against him.

== Medieval traditions ==
He appears in Geoffrey of Monmouth's Historia Regum Britanniae (1136) as Androgeus, eldest son of the legendary king Lud. The name change can be traced to copying errors in Orosius's Seven Books of History Against the Pagans, a 5th-century Christian history which was influential in medieval Britain, where it appears in different manuscripts as "Mandubragius" and "Andragorius". Bede, who follows Orosius almost verbatim for his account of Caesar's expeditions, calls him "Andragius" (a name which Geoffrey used for an earlier British king). Geoffrey might also have been influenced by the Greek mythological character Androgeus.

When Lud died, Androgeus and his brother Tasciovanus were too young to rule, so the throne went to their uncle Cassivellaunus. Androgeus was made Duke of Trinovantum (London) and Kent, and participated in the defence of Britain against Julius Caesar. After Caesar's first two invasions were repelled, the Britons held a celebration at which sacrifices were made to the gods and games played. Cuelinus, a nephew of Androgeus, wrestled with Hirelglas, Cassivellaunus's nephew, and killed him in a dispute over the result. Cassivellaunus demanded Androgeus hand over his nephew for trial, but fearing the king's intentions, Androgeus refused, offering to try him in his own court. Cassivellaunus made war on Androgeus, who appealed to Caesar for help. He gave hostages, including his own son Scaeva, as proof of his intentions, and Caesar invaded a third time. Between them, Androgeus and Caesar forced Cassivellaunus to submit and agree to pay tribute to Rome. Caesar spent the winter in Britain, and he and Cassivellaunus became friends. When he finally returned to Rome to fight the civil war against Pompey, Androgeus went with him, never to return.

In Middle Welsh versions of Geoffrey's Historia, and in the Welsh Triads, he appears as Afarwy. The Triads name him as one of the "Three Dishonoured Men of the Island of Britain" for inviting Caesar to invade.

John Koch suggests that Mandubracius might be the historical basis of the Welsh mythological figure Manawydan: he reconstructs the original form of his father's name as *Mannuētios, and an earlier form of Manwydan as *Mannuētiagnos, "son of Mannuetios".
