= 270s BC =

Decade

This article concerns the period 279 BC – 270 BC.

== Events ==
=== 279 BC ===
==== By place ====
====== Greece ======
- An army of Gauls under Brennus invade Greece. A section of the army, commanded by Bolgios, crushes a Macedonian army led by Ptolemy Keraunos, who is killed in the battle. At the narrow pass of Thermopylae, on the east coast of Central Greece, Brennus' forces suffer heavy losses while trying to break through the Greek defence comprising the Phocians and the Aetolians. Eventually Brennus finds a way around the pass but the Greeks escape by sea. Brennus pushes on to Delphi where he is defeated and forced to retreat, after which he dies of wounds sustained in the battle. His army falls back to the river Spercheios where it is routed by Thessalians and Malians. Some of the survivors settle in a part of Asia Minor that will eventually be called Galatia, while some settle in Thrace, founding a short-lived city-state named Tylis.
- With the death of Ptolemy Keraunos, the previous King of Macedonia, Antipater II becomes king again. However, his new reign lasts only a few months before he is killed by his cousin Sosthenes who becomes the new King of Macedonia.
- The Phocians are readmitted into the Amphictyonic League after they have joined in the defence of Delphi against the Gauls.

====== Roman Republic ======
- The Carthaginians and the Romans agree to support each other against a common foe. The Carthaginians give Rome money and ships in their fight against Pyrrhus, the king of Epirus.
- Pyrrhus realizes that he cannot capture Rome and suggests peace terms to the Romans. Pyrrhus sends his chief advisor, Cineas, to Rome to negotiate a peace. Cineas demands that the Romans halt their aggression against the Greeks of southern Italy and restore the lands the Romans have taken from the Bruttii, the Apulians, and the Samnites. The Romans reject his demands, largely at the instigation of the former Roman censor, Appius Claudius Caecus.
- In renewed fighting, Pyrrhus of Epirus, leading the combined Tarantine, Oscan, Samnite, and Greek forces, wins a 'Pyrrhic victory' against the Romans led by consul Publius Decius Mus at the Battle of Asculum, called such because his victory comes at a great cost to his own forces. Pyrrhus is reported to have said afterwards, "One more victory against the Romans and we shall be utterly ruined!" Disheartened, Pyrrhus retires to Tarentum and sends Cineas to make renewed peace overtures to Rome. These talks are inconclusive.

====== Egypt ======
- The aggression of Ptolemy II of Egypt continues to cause friction with Antiochus as he takes Miletus in south-western Asia Minor from him.

====== The Balkans ======
- Scordisci Celts found a city called Singidon (Roman Singidunum) which is today the Serbian city of Belgrade.

====== China ======
- General Bai Qi of the State of Qin attacks the State of Chu and captures the cities of Yan and Deng.
- General Lian Po of the State of Zhou defeats an army of the State of Qi.

=== 278 BC ===
==== By place ====
====== Seleucid Empire ======
- After their defeats in Greece, the Gauls move into Asia Minor. The Seleucid king Antiochus wins a major battle over the Gauls leading to his being given the title of Soter (Greek for "saviour"). The Gauls settle down to become the "Galatians" and are paid 2,000 talents annually by the Seleucid kings to keep the peace.
- Antigonus concludes a peace with Antiochus who surrenders his claim to Macedonia. Thereafter Antigonus II's foreign policy is marked by friendship with the Seleucids.
- Nicomedes I becomes the first ruler of Bithynia to assume the title of king. He founds the city of Nicomedia, which soon rises to great prosperity.

====== Sicily ======
- The Carthaginians seize an opportunity to interfere in a quarrel between Syracuse and Agrigentum and besiege Syracuse. The Syracusans ask for help from Pyrrhus and Pyrrhus transfers his army there.
- On his arrival in Sicily, Pyrrhus' forces win battles against the Carthaginians across Sicily. Pyrrhus conquers almost all of Sicily except for Lilybaeum (Marsala).
- Pyrrhus is proclaimed king of Sicily. He plans for his son Helenus to inherit the kingdom of Sicily and his other son Alexander to inherit Italy.

====== China ======
- The heartland of the State of Chu in the modern Hubei province is overrun by the powerful state of Qin from the west under Bai Qi's leadership. Sailing down the Han river from Bashu, Bai Qi captures Ying - the capital of Chu - as well as Yiling, and his army reaches as far as Jingling. Bai Qi is honoured as Lord Wu'an (武安君; literally: Lord of Martial Peace). The Chu government moves to the east, occupying various temporary capitals until settling in Shouchun in 241 BC.
- Qu Yuan writes the poem "Lament for Ying" after the fall of the capital of Chu.

=== 277 BC ===
==== By place ====
====== Greece ======
- Antigonus crosses the Hellespont and defeats the Celts under the command of Cerethrius at the Battle of Lysimachia near Lysimachia at the neck of the Thracian Chersonese. After this success, he is acknowledged by the Macedonians as their king.

====== Sicily ======
- Pyrrhus captures Eryx, the strongest Carthaginian fortress in Sicily. This prompts the rest of the Carthaginian-controlled cities in Sicily to defect to Pyrrhus.

====== Italy ======
- Battle of the Cranita Hills: Roman forces are defeated by the Samnites at the Cranita Hills during the Pyrrhic War.
- Consul Publius Cornelius Rufinus campaigns against the Lucanians and the Bruttians and captures Crotone.

=== 276 BC ===
==== By place ====
====== Egypt ======
- The Egyptian King Ptolemy II's first wife, Arsinoe I (daughter of the late King Lysimachus of Thrace) is accused, probably at instigation of Ptolemy II's sister (who also has the name Arsinoe), of plotting his murder and is exiled by the King. Arsinoe then marries her own brother, a customary practice in Egypt, but scandalous to the Greeks. The suffix "Philadelphoi" ("Brother-Loving") consequently is added to the names of King Ptolemy II and Queen Arsinoe II. The former queen, Arsinoe I, is banished to Coptos, a city of Upper Egypt near the Wadi Hammamat, while her rival adopts her children.
- The first of the Syrian Wars starts between Egypt's Ptolemy II and Seleucid emperor Antiochus I Soter. The Egyptians invade northern Syria, but Antiochus defeats and repels his opponent's army.

====== Greece ======
- Antigonus II Gonatas consolidated his control over Macedon and Thessaly.

====== Sicily ======
- Pyrrhus negotiates with the Carthaginians to end the fighting between them in Sicily. The Carthaginians are inclined to come to terms with Pyrrhus, but he demands that Carthage abandon all of Sicily and make the Libyan Sea the boundary between Carthage and the Greeks. Meanwhile, he begins to display despotic behaviour towards the Sicilian Greeks and soon Sicilian opinion moves against him. Therefore, fearing that his successes in Sicily may lead him to become the despot of their country, the Syracusans ask Pyrrhus to leave Sicily. He does so, and returns to the Italian mainland, noting that he expects Sicily to be a "fair wrestling ring" for Carthage and Rome.

====== China ======
- General Bai Qi of the State of Qin attacks the State of Wei and captures two cities.
- General Lian Po of the State of Zhou captures the Wei city of Qi.

=== 275 BC ===
==== By place ====
====== Egypt ======
- The Museum of Alexandria is founded by the Egyptian King Ptolemy II.

====== Roman Republic ======
- When Pyrrhus returns from Sicily, he finds himself vastly outnumbered by a superior Roman army under the command of consul Manius Curius Dentatus. After the inconclusive Battle of Beneventum, Roman commander and statesman, Gaius Fabricius Luscinus, negotiates a peace with Pyrrhus, after which Pyrrhus decides to end his campaign in Italy and return to Epirus, which results in the loss of all his Italian holdings.

====== Sicily ======
- Following the departure of Pyrrhus from Sicily, the Syracusan army and the city's citizens appoint Hiero II as the commander of their slaves. He strengthens his position by marrying the daughter of Leptines, the city's leading citizen.

====== Greece ======
- Antiochus's alliance with Antigonus II, now fully in possession of Macedonia, is cemented by Antigonus's marriage to Phila, Antiochus's half sister.

====== China ======
- General Bai Qi of the State of Qin brings order to the rebellious provinces of Wu and Qianzhong, which had been formed from the territories conquered from the State of Chu between 280 and 278 BC.
- General Lian Po of the State of Zhou invades the State of Wei and captures the cities of Fangling and Anyang.

=== 274 BC ===
==== By place ====
====== Greece ======
- Pyrrhus returns from Italy and Sicily and invades Macedonia defeating Antigonus II Gonatas at the Battle of the Aous and conquering Upper Macedonia and Thessaly while Antigonus holds onto the coastal Macedonian towns. Antigonus' troops desert him and Pyrrhus is declared King of Macedonia.

====== Roman Republic ======
- The Romans under Manius Curius Dentatus conquer the Lucanians.

====== Egypt ======
- Magas of Cyrene marries Apama, the daughter of Antiochus and uses his marital alliance to foment a pact to invade Egypt. He opens hostilities against his half brother Ptolemy II, by declaring his province of Cyrenaica to be independent and then attacks Egypt from the west as Antiochus I takes the Egyptian controlled areas in coastal Syria and southern Anatolia, after which he attacks Palestine.
- Magas has to stop his advance against Ptolemy II due to an internal revolt by the Libyan Marmaridae nomads.

=== 273 BC ===
==== By place ====
====== Egypt ======
- Impressed by Rome's defeat of Pyrrhus of Epirus, Pharaoh Ptolemy II Philadelphus sends a friendly embassy. The visit is reciprocated.

====== China ======
- General Bai Qi of the State of Qin attacks the State of Wei and State of Zhou. He captures the city of Huyang and wins three battles, defeating the army of the Zhao general Jia Yan.

=== 272 BC ===
==== By place ====
====== Seleucid Empire ======
- The Seleucid king Antiochus I Soter is defeated by Egypt's Ptolemy II during the First Syrian War. Ptolemy II annexes Miletus, Phoenicia and western Cilicia from Antiochus. As a result, Ptolemy II extends Egyptian rule as far as Caria and into most of Cilicia.

====== Egypt ======
- Egypt's victories solidify the kingdom's position as the undisputed naval power of the eastern Mediterranean; the Ptolemaic sphere of power now extends over the Cyclades to Samothrace, and the harbours and coastal towns of Cilicia Trachea, Pamphylia, Lycia and Caria.

====== Roman Republic ======
- Tarentum, a Greek city in Italy, makes peace with the Romans.
- Rome builds the aqueduct Anio Vetus on the Esquiline hill.
- Pyrrhus' departure from southern Italy three years earlier leads to the Samnites finally being conquered by the Romans. With the surrender of Tarentum, the cities of Magna Graecia in southern Italy come under Roman influence and become Roman allies. Rome now effectively dominates all of the Italian peninsula.

====== Greece ======
- Cleonymus, a Spartan of royal blood who has been outcast by his fellow Spartans, asks the King of Macedonia and Epirus, Pyrrhus, to attack Sparta and place him in power. Pyrrhus agrees to the plan, but intends to win control of the Peloponnese for himself. As a large part of the Spartan army led by king Areus I is in Crete at the time, Pyrrhus has great hopes of taking the city easily, but the citizens organise stout resistance, allowing one of Antigonus II's commanders, Aminias the Phocian, to reach the city with a force of mercenaries from Corinth. Soon after this, the Spartan king, Areus, returns from Crete with 2,000 men. These reinforcements stiffen Spartan resistance and Pyrrhus, finding that he is losing men to desertion every day, breaks off the attack and starts to plunder the country.
- As they plunder the countryside, Pyrrhus and his troops move onto Argos. Entering the city with his army by stealth, Pyrrhus finds himself caught in a confused battle with the Argives (who are supported by Antigonus' forces and a detachment from Sparta) in the narrow city streets. During the confusion an old woman watching from a rooftop throws a roof tile at Pyrrhus which stuns him, allowing an Argive soldier to kill him.
- Following his death in Argos, Pyrrhus is succeeded as king of Epirus by his son Alexander II while Antigonus II Gonatas regains his Macedonian throne which he has lost to Pyrrhus two years earlier.

====== India ======
- The Mauryan emperor, Bindusara, sends the Mauryan army to conquer the southern kingdoms. Kadamba is conquered.

=== 271 BC ===
==== By place ====
====== Greece ======
- With the restoration of the territories captured by Pyrrhus, and with grateful allies in Sparta and Argos, and garrisons in Corinth and other Greek key cities, Antigonus II securely controls Macedonia and the other states of Greece. Antigonus becomes the chief of the Thessalian League and is on good terms with neighbouring Illyria and Thrace. He secures his position in central and south Greece by keeping Macedonian occupation forces in the cities of Corinth, Chalcis on the island of Euboea, and Demetrias in Thessaly, the three "shackles" of Hellas.

====== India ======
- The Mauryan empire annexes the southern kingdoms till the realms of the three crowned kings of Chola,Chera and Pandya

=== 270 BC ===
==== By place ====
====== Roman Republic ======
- Rome's subjugation of Italy is completed by the recapture of Rhegium (southern Italy) from the Mamertines and the defeat of the Brutians, the Lucanians, the Calabrians and the Samnites. The town of Rhegium is then restored by the Romans to its Greek inhabitants.

====== Carthage ======
- Carthage, already in control of Sardinia, southern Spain and Numidia, is ruled by an oligarchy of merchants under two Suffetes or chief magistrates. While Carthage's military commanders are strong, the state relies on mercenaries (including Spanish ones) for its soldiers.

== Births ==
279 BC

- Chrysippus, Greek Stoic philosopher (approximate date)

277 BC

- Fan Zeng, Chinese adviser during the Chu-Han Contention (d. 204 BC)

276 BC

- Eratosthenes, Greek mathematician, geographer and astronomer (d. 194 BC)

275 BC

- Hamilcar Barca, Carthaginian general, statesman and father of Hannibal (approximate date)
- Quintus Fabius Maximus Verrucosus, Roman dictator, politician and leader (approximate date)

273 BC

- Kōgen, emperor of Japan (d. 158 BC)

271 BC

- Aratus of Sicyon, Greek general (strategos) and statesman (d. 213 BC)

270 BC

- Hamilcar Barca, founder of Barcid Spain and leading Carthaginian general who will fight against Rome in Sicily and Italy, against the Libyans and the mercenary revolt in Africa, and against the Iberians and Celti-Iberians in Spain (d. 228 BC)
- Gnaeus Naevius, was a Roman epic poet and dramatist of the Old Latin period. (d.201 BC)

== Deaths ==
279 BC

- Brennus, leader of the army of Gauls who in 279 BC invaded Macedonia and northern Greece
- Ptolemy Keraunos, king of Macedonia from 281 to 279 BC

278 BC

- Polyaenus of Lampsacus, Greek mathematician and philosopher and friend of Epicurus (b. c. 340 BC)
- Qu Yuan, Chinese poet from southern Chu who lived during the Warring States period. His works are mostly found in an anthology of poetry known as Chu Ci (b. c. 340 BC)

277 BC

- Sosthenes, Macedonian general and king of the Antipatrid Dynasty

275 BC

- Shen Dao, Chinese philosopher from Zhao who also served at the Jixia academy in Qi. He is known for his blend of Legalism and Taoism (approximate date)

273 BC

- Appius Claudius Caecus, Roman politician and consul
- Simeon The Just, Jewish High Priest and one of the last members of the Great Assembly
- Xi of Han, Chinese king of Han (Warring States Period)

272 BC

- Aristotimus, Greek tyrant of Elis (approximate date)
- Bindusara, emperor of the Mauryan Empire (b. c. 320 BC)
- Ptolemy, son of Pyrrhus of Epirus (b. 295 BC)
- Pyrrhus of Epirus, king of the Molossians (from c. 297 BC), Epirus (306–301 and 297–272 BC) and Macedon (288–284 and 273–272 BC); involved in disputes in southern Italy against Rome and in Sicily (b. 318 BC)

270 BC

- Arsinoe II, queen to Lysimachus, the king of Thrace, and later wife of her brother, King Ptolemy II Philadelphus of Egypt (b. c. 316 BC)
- Epicurus, Greek philosopher, author of an ethical philosophy of simple pleasure, friendship, and retirement (b. 341 BC)
- Marcus Valerius Corvus, Roman hero (b. c. 370 BC)
- Manius Curius Dentatus, Roman general, conqueror of the Samnites and victor against Pyrrhus, King of Epirus
- Pyrrho, Greek philosopher from Elis, credited as being the first skeptic philosopher and inspiration for the school known as Pyrrhonism (b. c. 360 BC)
- Euclid of Alexandria, Mathematician, considered the "father of geometry", chiefly known for the Elements treatise, which established the foundations of geometry, has been estimated to die in 270 BC
