= Dardanian-Celtic War =

Conflict during the ancient era

- Part of the Great Celtic Invasion
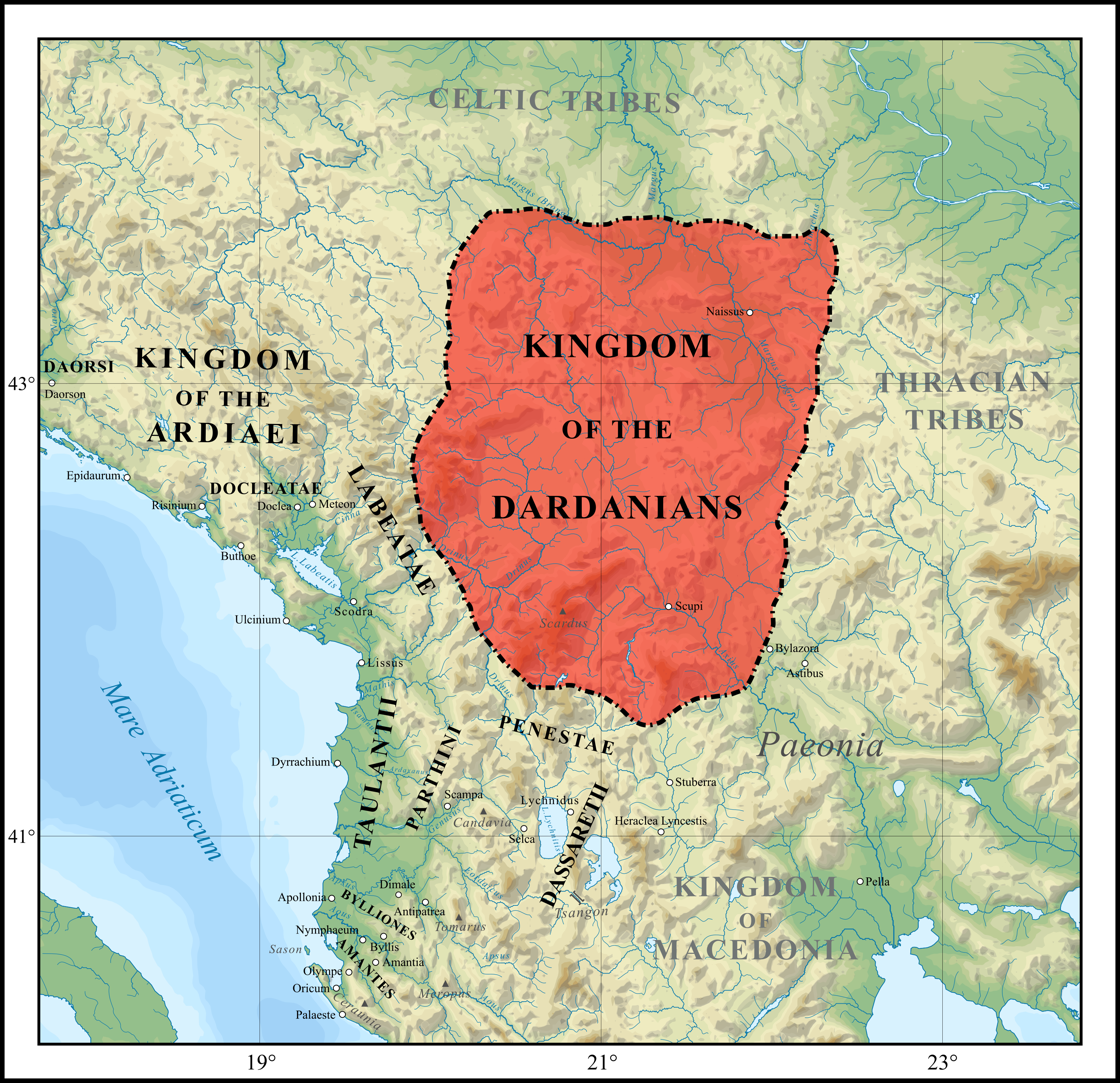
- Kingdom of the Dardanians, late 3rd century BC, prior to their conquest of Paeonia and Macedonia.
Date	298-279 BC
Location	Dardania, Illyria
Result	Dardanian victory: Celtic forces raid Dardania and eventually reach Greece.; After the defeat at the hands of the greeks at Delphi the Celts retreat back but are ambushed and defeated by the Dardanians

Belligerents
Kingdom of Dardania	Celts

Commanders and leaders
Bardylis II; Monounios	Molistomos; Cerethrius; Brennus; Acichorius

Strength
20,000+	Tens of thousands

Casualties and losses
Minor	Heavy

The Dardanian-Celtic War was a conflict that happened during 279 BC between the Illyrian kingdom of the Dardani and the Celtic tribes.

== Background ==
The constant flux that the political situation in the northern Balkans had found itself led to several organized campaigns and tribal conflicts. The Celts were one of the most powerful tribal unities in the region, with them beginning a campaign in the Balkan peninsula. During the 4rth century BC the political situation in the Balkans played a big role for Celtic campaigns and migrations into Illyria, as the Illyrians had been waging war against Alexander the Great, leaving their western flank undefended. During the reign of Alexander, the Celts did not invade the southern Balkans, choosing instead to attack the Northern Illyrian tribes.

The first Illyric tribe which was invaded by the Celts were the Autariatae, who had enjoyed a hegemony over much of the Central Balkans, centered on the Morava valley. An account of Celtic tactics is revealed in their attacks on the Ardiaei. Celtic campaigns in Illyria continued when the Celts took the Illyrian settlement in modern-day Osijek, held by the Andizetes.

In 310 BC, the Celtic general Molistomos attempted to attack deep into Illyrian territory, with an attempt of subduing the Dardanians, Paeonians and Triballi, however he was defeated by the Dardanians. In 298 BC, the Celts attempted to penetrate into Thrace and Macedon, where they suffered a heavy defeat near Haemus Mons at the hands of Cassander. However, another army of Celts led by the general Cambaules marched on Thrace, capturing large areas. The Celts then formed the Serdi tribe in Thrace which built the city of Serdica, modernday Sofia.

== Events ==
During 279 BC, the Celts raided the northern-Illyrian tribes as a part of their campaign to plunder the treasuries of the temples of Ancient Greece. The Celts heavily raided settlements in the Kingdom of Dardania which were near the streams of the Morava and Vardar. One such raid was the raid on Cërnica, an illyrian settlement near the Binça branch of the Vardar river near modern day Gjilan on the then Dardanian-Macedon border. The remains of the destroyed settlements were found by archeologists in 2018. During these events an unnamed Dardanian king offered to help the Macedonians with 20,000 soldiers to counteract the invading Celts, as Macedon was also a subject to the Celtic raids, but it was refused by the Macedonian king Ptolemy Keraunos who, underestimating the Celtic strength, died fighting them.

=== Celtic Retreat through Dardania ===
After suffering defeat at the Attack on Delphi, the Celts, weakened, began their retreat back to Central Europe. During this retreat the Celts were ambushed by the Dardani and were completely destroyed with most of their forces being killed in the ensuing battle.

== Aftermath ==
Some of the survivors of the Greek campaign, led by Comontoris (one of Brennus' generals) settled in Thrace. In 277 BC, Antigonus II Gonatas defeated the Gauls at the Battle of Lysimachia and the survivors retreated, founding a short-lived city-state named Tyle. Another group of Gauls, who split off from Brennus' army in 281 BC, were transported over to Asia Minor by Nicomedes I to help him defeat his brother and secure the throne of Bithynia. They eventually settled in the region that came to be named after them, Galatia. They were defeated by Antiochus I, and as a result, they were confined to barren highlands in the centre of Anatolia.

== Sources ==
- Hammond, Nicholas Geoffrey Lemprière (1988). A History of Macedonia: 336-167 B.C. Oxford University Press. ISBN 978-0-19-814815-9.
- Petrović, Vladimir P. (2006). "Pre-roman and Roman Dardania historical and geographical considerations". Balcanica (37): 7–23. doi:10.2298/BALC0637007P. hdl:21.15107/rcub_dais_4231.
