= 279 BC =

279 BC in various calendars
Gregorian calendar	279 BC; CCLXXIX BC
Ab urbe condita	475
Ancient Egypt era	XXXIII dynasty, 45
Pharaoh	Ptolemy II Philadelphus, 5
Ancient Greek Olympiad (summer)	125th Olympiad, year 2
Assyrian calendar	4472
Balinese saka calendar	N/A
Bengali calendar	−872 – −871
Berber calendar	672
Buddhist calendar	266
Burmese calendar	−916
Byzantine calendar	5230–5231
Chinese calendar	辛巳年 (Metal Snake); 2419 or 2212 — to — 壬午年 (Water Horse); 2420 or 2213
Coptic calendar	−562 – −561
Discordian calendar	888
Ethiopian calendar	−286 – −285
Hebrew calendar	3482–3483
- Hindu calendars
Vikram Samvat	−222 – −221
Shaka Samvat	N/A
Kali Yuga	2822–2823
Holocene calendar	9722
Iranian calendar	900 BP – 899 BP
Islamic calendar	928 BH – 927 BH
Javanese calendar	N/A
Julian calendar	N/A
Korean calendar	2055
Minguo calendar	2190 before ROC 民前2190年
Nanakshahi calendar	−1746
Seleucid era	33/34 AG
Thai solar calendar	264–265
Tibetan calendar	阴金蛇年 (female Iron-Snake) −152 or −533 or −1305 — to — 阳水马年 (male Water-Horse) −151 or −532 or −1304

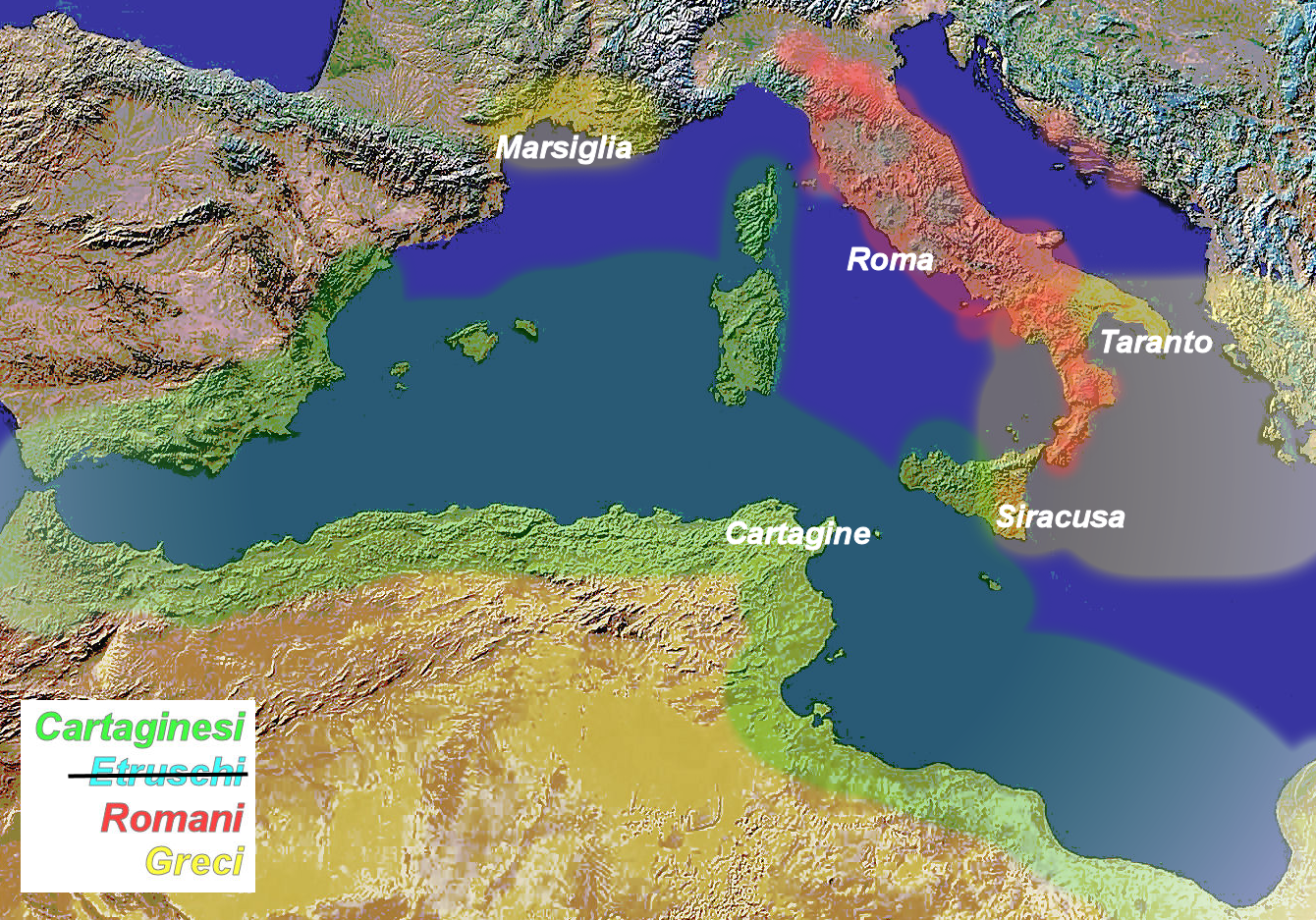
The west Mediterranean in 279 BC.

Year 279 BC was a year of the pre-Julian Roman calendar. At the time it was known as the Year of the Consulship of Publius Sulpicius Saverrio and Publius Decius Mus (or, less frequently, year 475 Ab urbe condita). The denomination 279 BC for this year has been used since the early medieval period, when the Anno Domini calendar era became the prevalent method in Europe for many years.

== Events ==
=== By place ===
==== Greece ====
- An army of Gauls under Brennus invade Greece. A section of the army, commanded by Bolgios, crushes a Macedonian army led by Ptolemy Keraunos, who is killed in the battle. At the narrow pass of Thermopylae, on the east coast of Central Greece, Brennus' forces suffer heavy losses while trying to break through the Greek defence comprising the Phocians and the Aetolians. Eventually Brennus finds a way around the pass but the Greeks escape by sea. Brennus pushes on to Delphi where he is defeated and forced to retreat, after which he dies of wounds sustained in the battle. His army falls back to the river Spercheios where it is routed by Thessalians and Malians. Some of the survivors settle in a part of Asia Minor that will eventually be called Galatia, while some settle in Thrace, founding a short-lived city-state named Tylis.
- With the death of Ptolemy Keraunos, the previous King of Macedonia, Antipater II becomes king again. However, his new reign lasts only a few months before he is killed by his cousin Sosthenes who becomes the new King of Macedonia.
- The Phocians are readmitted into the Amphictyonic League after they have joined in the defence of Delphi against the Gauls.

==== Roman Republic ====
- The Carthaginians and the Romans agree to support each other against a common foe. The Carthaginians give Rome money and ships in their fight against Pyrrhus, the king of Epirus.
- Pyrrhus realizes that he cannot capture Rome and suggests peace terms to the Romans. Pyrrhus sends his chief advisor, Cineas, to Rome to negotiate a peace. Cineas demands that the Romans halt their aggression against the Greeks of southern Italy and restore the lands the Romans have taken from the Bruttii, the Apulians, and the Samnites. The Romans reject his demands, largely at the instigation of the former Roman censor, Appius Claudius Caecus.
- In renewed fighting, Pyrrhus of Epirus, leading the combined Tarantine, Oscan, Samnite, and Greek forces, wins a 'Pyrrhic victory' against the Romans led by consul Publius Decius Mus at the Battle of Asculum, called such because his victory comes at a great cost to his own forces. Pyrrhus is reported to have said afterwards, "One more victory against the Romans and we shall be utterly ruined!" Disheartened, Pyrrhus retires to Tarentum and sends Cineas to make renewed peace overtures to Rome. These talks are inconclusive.

==== Egypt ====
- The aggression of Ptolemy II of Egypt continues to cause friction with Antiochus as he takes Miletus in south-western Asia Minor from him.

==== The Balkans ====
- Scordisci Celts found a city called Singidon (Roman Singidunum) which is today the Serbian city of Belgrade.

==== China ====
- General Bai Qi of the State of Qin attacks the State of Chu and captures the cities of Yan and Deng.
- General Lian Po of the State of Zhou defeats an army of the State of Qi.

== Births ==
- Chrysippus, Greek Stoic philosopher (approximate date)

== Deaths ==
- Brennus, leader of the army of Gauls who in 279 BC invaded Macedonia and northern Greece
- Ptolemy Keraunos, king of Macedonia from 281 to 279 BC
