= 272 BC =

272 BC in various calendars
- Gregorian calendar: 272 BC; CCLXXII BC
- Ab urbe condita: 482
- Ancient Egypt era: XXXIII dynasty, 52
- Pharaoh: Ptolemy II Philadelphus, 12
- Ancient Greek Olympiad (summer): 127th Olympiad (victor)¹
- Assyrian calendar: 4479
- Balinese saka calendar: N/A
- Bengali calendar: −865 – −864
- Berber calendar: 679
- Buddhist calendar: 273
- Burmese calendar: −909
- Byzantine calendar: 5237–5238
- Chinese calendar: 戊子年 (Earth Rat); 2426 or 2219 — to — 己丑年 (Earth Ox); 2427 or 2220
- Coptic calendar: −555 – −554
- Discordian calendar: 895
- Ethiopian calendar: −279 – −278
- Hebrew calendar: 3489–3490
- Hindu calendars
- Vikram Samvat: −215 – −214
- Shaka Samvat: N/A
- Kali Yuga: 2829–2830
- Holocene calendar: 9729
- Iranian calendar: 893 BP – 892 BP
- Islamic calendar: 920 BH – 919 BH
- Javanese calendar: N/A
- Julian calendar: N/A
- Korean calendar: 2062
- Minguo calendar: 2183 before ROC 民前2183年
- Nanakshahi calendar: −1739
- Seleucid era: 40/41 AG
- Thai solar calendar: 271–272
- Tibetan calendar: ས་ཕོ་བྱི་བ་ལོ་ (male Earth-Rat) −145 or −526 or −1298 — to — ས་མོ་གླང་ལོ་ (female Earth-Ox) −144 or −525 or −1297

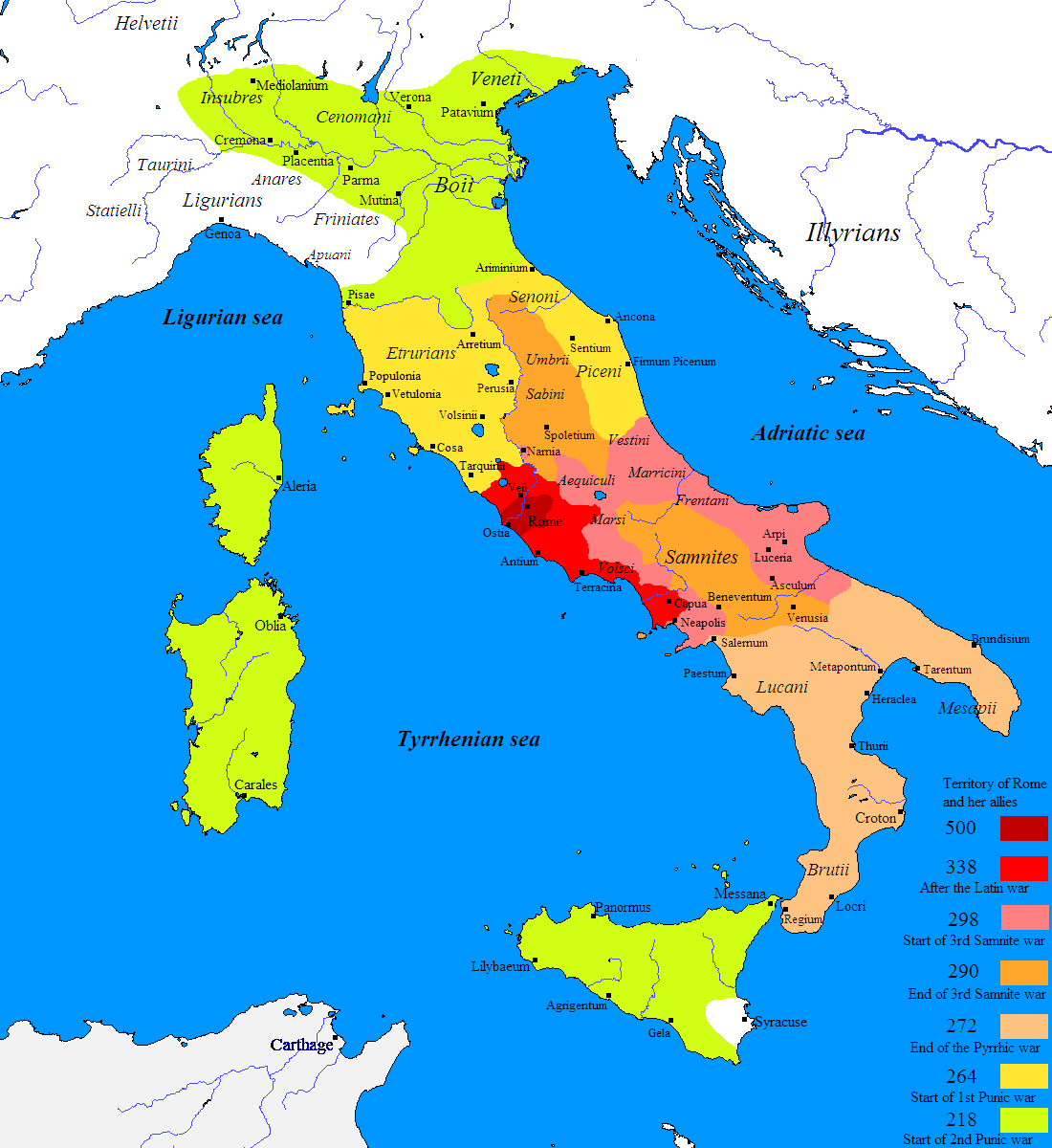
Roman expansion in Italy from 500 BC to 218 BC through the Latin War (light red), Samnite Wars (pink/orange), Pyrrhic War (beige), and First and Second Punic War (yellow and green). The Roman Republic in 272 BC is marked with dark and light red, pink, orange and beige.

Year 272 BC was a year of the pre-Julian Roman calendar. At the time it was known as the Year of the Consulship of Cursor and Maximus (or, less frequently, year 482 Ab urbe condita). The denomination 272 BC for this year has been used since the early medieval period, when the Anno Domini calendar era became the prevalent method in Europe for naming years.

== Events ==
=== By place ===
==== Seleucid Empire ====
- The Seleucid king Antiochus I Soter is defeated by Egypt's Ptolemy II during the First Syrian War. Ptolemy II annexes Miletus, Phoenicia and western Cilicia from Antiochus. As a result, Ptolemy II extends Egyptian rule as far as Caria and into most of Cilicia.

==== Egypt ====
- Egypt's victories solidify the kingdom's position as the undisputed naval power of the eastern Mediterranean; the Ptolemaic sphere of power now extends over the Cyclades to Samothrace, and the harbours and coastal towns of Cilicia Trachea, Pamphylia, Lycia and Caria.

==== Roman Republic ====
- Tarentum, a Greek city in Italy, makes peace with the Romans.
- Rome builds the aqueduct Anio Vetus on the Esquiline hill.
- Pyrrhus' departure from southern Italy three years earlier leads to the Samnites finally being conquered by the Romans. With the surrender of Tarentum, the cities of Magna Graecia in southern Italy come under Roman influence and become Roman allies. Rome now effectively dominates all of the Italian peninsula.

==== Greece ====
- Cleonymus, a Spartan of royal blood who has been outcast by his fellow Spartans, asks the King of Macedonia and Epirus, Pyrrhus, to attack Sparta and place him in power. Pyrrhus agrees to the plan, but intends to win control of the Peloponnese for himself. As a large part of the Spartan army led by king Areus I is in Crete at the time, Pyrrhus has great hopes of taking the city easily, but the citizens organise stout resistance, allowing one of Antigonus II's commanders, Aminias the Phocian, to reach the city with a force of mercenaries from Corinth. Soon after this, the Spartan king, Areus, returns from Crete with 2,000 men. These reinforcements stiffen Spartan resistance and Pyrrhus, finding that he is losing men to desertion every day, breaks off the attack and starts to plunder the country.
- As they plunder the countryside, Pyrrhus and his troops move onto Argos. Entering the city with his army by stealth, Pyrrhus finds himself caught in a confused battle with the Argives (who are supported by Antigonus' forces and a detachment from Sparta) in the narrow city streets. During the confusion an old woman watching from a rooftop throws a roof tile at Pyrrhus which stuns him, allowing an Argive soldier to kill him.
- Following his death in Argos, Pyrrhus is succeeded as king of Epirus by his son Alexander II while Antigonus II Gonatas regains his Macedonian throne which he has lost to Pyrrhus two years earlier.

==== India ====
- The Mauryan emperor, Bindusara, sends the Mauryan army to conquer the southern kingdoms. Kadamba is conquered.

== Deaths ==
- Aristotimus, Greek tyrant of Elis (approximate date)
- Bindusara, emperor of the Mauryan Empire (b. c. 320 BC)
- Ptolemy, son of Pyrrhus of Epirus (b. 295 BC)
- Pyrrhus of Epirus, king of the Molossians (from c. 297 BC), Epirus (306–301 and 297–272 BC) and Macedon (288–284 and 273–272 BC); involved in disputes in southern Italy against Rome and in Sicily (b. 318 BC)
