= Battle of Thermopylae (279 BC) =

279 BCE battle between Greeks and Gauls

Coordinates: 38.8053°N 22.5628°E

- Part of Gallic invasion of the Balkans
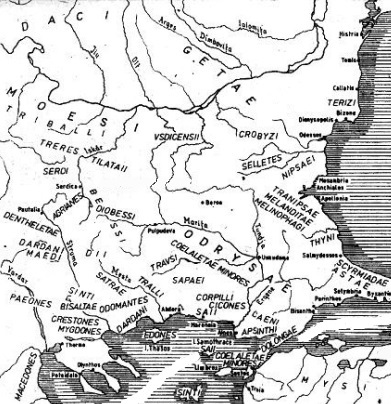
- Route of the Gallic invasion of the Balkans
Date	279 BC
Location	Thermopylae
Result	Celtic victory at Thermopylae; Celtic attack at Aetolia repulsed

Belligerents
Celts	Aetolian League; Boeotians; Athenians; Phocians; Locrians; Megarians; Macedonian and Seleucid mercenaries

Commanders and leaders
Brennos; Akichorios; Orestorios; Kombotis	Kalippos (Athenian contingent); Kephisodotos, Thearidas, Diogenes and Lysandros (Boeotian contingent); Kritobulos and Antiochos (Phokian contingent); Meidias (Locrian contingent); Hipponikos (Megarian contingent); Eurydamos, Polyarchos, Polyphron and Lakrates (Aetolian contingent); Aristomedos (Macedonian mercenaries); Telesarchos (Greek and Syrian mercenaries)

The Battle of Thermopylae was fought in 279 BC between invading Gallic armies and a combined Greek army of Aetolians, Boeotians, Athenians, Phocians and Locrians at Thermopylae. The Gauls under Brennus were victorious, and advanced further into the Greek peninsula where they attempted to sack Delphi but were completely defeated.

== Background ==
Gallic groups, originating from the various La Tène chiefdoms, began a south-eastern movement into the Balkan Peninsula from the 4th century BC. Although Gallic settlements were concentrated in the western half of the Carpathian Basin, there were notable incursions, and settlements, within the Balkan Peninsula itself.

From their new bases in northern Illyria and Pannonia, the Gallic invasions climaxed in the early 3rd century BC, with the invasion of Greece. The 279 BC invasion of Greece proper was preceded by a series of other military campaigns waged in the southern Balkans and against the kingdom of Macedonia, favoured by the state of confusion ensuing from the complex and divisive succession processes following Alexander's sudden death.

The Celtic military pressure toward Greece in the southern Balkans reached its turning point in 281 BC. In 280 BC a great army, comprising about 85,000 warriors, approached from Pannonia and split into three divisions. These forces marched south to Macedon and central Greece. Under the leadership of Cerethrius, 20,000 men moved against the Thracians and Triballi. Another division, led by Brennus and Acichorius moved against Paionians, while a third division, headed by Bolgios, headed towards the Macedonians and Illyrians.

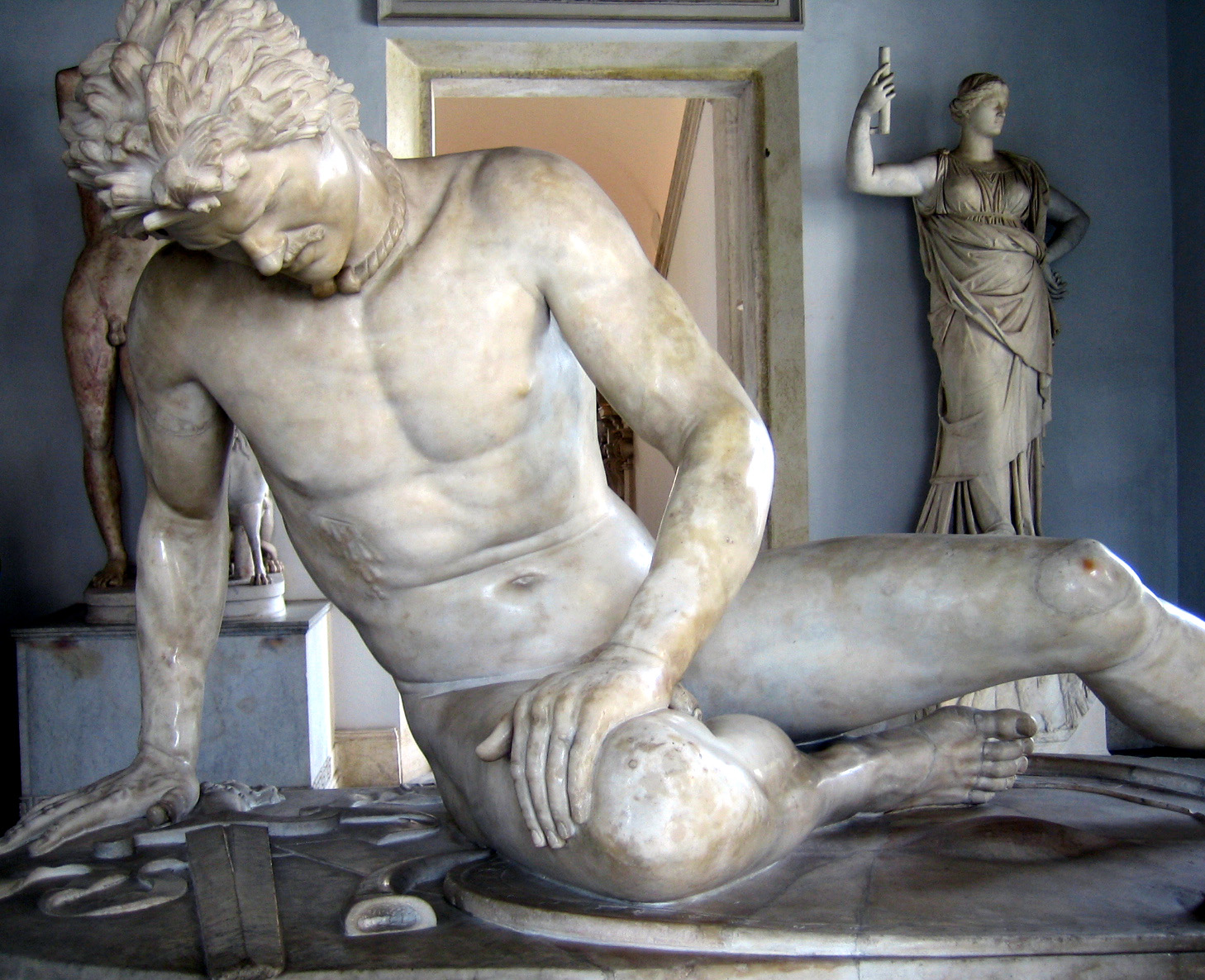
The Dying Gaul, a Roman copy of a Greek statue commemorating a later victory of Pergamon over the Galatians

Bolgios inflicted heavy losses on the Macedonians, whose young king, Ptolemy Keraunos, was captured and decapitated. However, Bolgios' contingent was repulsed by the Macedonian nobleman Sosthenes, and satisfied with the loot they had won, Bolgios' contingents turned back. Sosthenes, in turn, was attacked and defeated by Brennus and his forces, who were then free to ravage the country.

After these expeditions returned home, Brennus urged and persuaded them to mount a third united expedition against central Greece, led by himself and Acichorius.

== Battle ==
A Greek coalition made up of Aetolians, Boeotians, Athenians, Phocians, and other Greeks north of Corinth took up positions at the narrow pass of Thermopylae, on the east coast of central Greece. During the initial assault, Brennus' forces suffered heavy losses. Hence he decided to send a large force under Acichorius against Aetolia. The Aetolian detachment, as Brennus hoped, left Thermopylae to defend their homes. The Aetolians all joined the defence – the old and women joining the fight. Realising that the Gallic sword was dangerous only at close quarters, the Aetolians resorted to skirmishing tactics. The Gauls destroyed Kallion, on the border between Eurytania and rest of Aetolia, but the resistance of the entire Aetolian population at the site of Kokkalia dealt a decisive blow to the Galatian threat. According to Pausanias, only half the number who had set out for Aetolia returned.

Eventually Brennus found a way around the pass at Thermopylae, but the Greeks escaped by sea thanks to the Athenian fleet.

== Celtic defeat at Delphi and aftermath ==
Brennus pushed on to Delphi, where he was defeated and forced to retreat, after which he died of wounds sustained in the battle. His army fell back to the river Spercheios, where it was routed by the Thessalians and Malians.

Some of the survivors of the Greek campaign, led by Comontoris (one of Brennus' generals), settled in Thrace, founding a short-lived city-state named Tyle.

Another group of Gauls, who split off from Brennus' army in 281 BC, were transported over to Asia Minor by Nicomedes I to help him defeat his brother and secure the throne of Bithynia. They eventually settled in the region that came to be named after them as Galatia. They were defeated by Antiochus I, and as a result, they were confined to barren highlands in the centre of Anatolia.

In contrast, the Aetolian League strengthened its position in mainland Greece and for about a century the League controlled Delphi. The Aetolians set up an honorary stele on a base which presumably depicted pieces of armour from the Gauls. They also erected the so-called "Portico of the Aetolians", or Western Portico, one of the largest buildings close to the sanctuary of Apollo.

As a token of gratitude, the Aetolians were accorded the right to participate at the amphictyonic convention. The Amphictyonic Soteria were organised and in 246 BC were renamed "Aetolian Soteria" and evolved into the Panhellenic Games which took place every five years.

== Bibliography ==
- Ellis, P.B. (1997). Celt and Greek: Celts in the Hellenic World. Constable.
- Grainger, D. (1999). The League of the Aetolians. Koln: Brill.
- Green, P. (1993). Alexander to Actium. California: University of California Press.
- Παπαχατζής, Ν. (1981). «Φωκικά». Παυσανία Ελλάδος Περιήγησις. Αθήνα: Εκδοτική Αθηνών.
- Scholten, J.B. (2000). The Politics of Plunder: Aitolians and Their Koinon in the Early Hellenistic Era.
