= Olbiades =

Olbiades (Ancient Greek: Ὀλβιάδης) was an ancient Greek painter. One of his works was a painting portraying Calippus, the general of the Athenians during the Battle of Thermopylae (279 BC) against the Gauls. The paint was in the Bouleuterion of the Five Hundred (they were the Athenian councillors for a year) in the Kerameikos at Athens.
