= Battle of Lysimachia =

277 BC Antigonid victory over the Gauls in Greece

- Part of Gallic invasion of the Balkans
Date	277 BC
Location	Lysimachia, Thracian Chersonese (modern-day Eksemil, Çanakkale, Turkey)
Result	Antigonid victory

Belligerents
Macedonia	Celts

Commanders and leaders
Antigonos II	Kerethrios

The Battle of Lysimachia was fought in 277 BC between the Gallic tribes settled in Thrace and a Greek army of Antigonus at Lysimachia, Thracian Chersonese. After the Greek defeat at Battle of Thermopylae, the Gauls retreated out of Greece and moved through Thrace and finally into Asia.

Antigonus' father, Demetrius Poliorcetes, had been driven from the Macedonian throne by Pyrrhus of Epirus and Lysimachus in 288 BC. Tired of war, Demetrius surrendered himself to Seleucus I Nicator in 285 BC, leaving Antigonus as the Antigonid heir to the Macedonian throne.

In 277 BC Antigonus organized an expedition to take Macedon from Sosthenes of Macedon. He sailed to the Hellespont, landing near Lysimachia at the neck of the Thracian Chersonese. The site of the landing was the territory of wild Gallic tribes, who had settled the place after being driven out of Greece. When an army of Gauls under the command of Cerethrius appeared, Antigonus laid an ambush. He abandoned his camp and beached his ships, then concealed his men. The Gauls looted the camp, but when they started to attack the ships, Antigonus's army appeared, trapping them with the sea to their rear. In this way, Antigonus was able to inflict a crushing defeat on them and claim the Macedonian throne. It was around this time, under these favorable omens, that his son and successor, Demetrius II Aetolicus was born by his niece-wife Phila.

== Citations ==
Diogenes Laertius, Lives of Eminent Philosophers, R.D. Hicks, Ed.
