= Meleager (king) =

King of Macedonia in 279 BC

King of Macedonia
- Reign: 279 BC (2 months)
- Predecessor: Ptolemy Keraunos
- Successor: Antipater II Etesias
- Born: 3rd c. BC
- Died: 3rd c. BC
- Greek: Μελέαγρος
- House: Ptolemaic dynasty
- Father: Ptolemy I Soter
- Mother: Eurydice of Antipatrids

Meleager of Macedonia (Greek: Μελέαγρος) was the brother of Ptolemy Keraunos and son of Ptolemy I Soter and Eurydice. Meleager ruled as King of Macedonia during 279 BC for two months until he was compelled by his Macedonian troops to abdicate his crown.

== Citations ==
Preceded by Ptolemy II Ceraunus	King of Macedon; 279 BC	Succeeded by Antipater II Etesias
