= 402 BC =

402 BC in various calendars
Gregorian calendar	402 BC; CDII BC
Ab urbe condita	352
Ancient Egypt era	XXVIII dynasty, 3
Pharaoh	Amyrtaeus, 3
Ancient Greek Olympiad (summer)	94th Olympiad, year 3
Assyrian calendar	4349
Balinese saka calendar	N/A
Bengali calendar	−995 – −994
Berber calendar	549
Buddhist calendar	143
Burmese calendar	−1039
Byzantine calendar	5107–5108
Chinese calendar	戊寅年 (Earth Tiger); 2296 or 2089 — to — 己卯年 (Earth Rabbit); 2297 or 2090
Coptic calendar	−685 – −684
Discordian calendar	765
Ethiopian calendar	−409 – −408
Hebrew calendar	3359–3360
- Hindu calendars
Vikram Samvat	−345 – −344
Shaka Samvat	N/A
Kali Yuga	2699–2700
Holocene calendar	9599
Iranian calendar	1023 BP – 1022 BP
Islamic calendar	1054 BH – 1053 BH
Javanese calendar	N/A
Julian calendar	N/A
Korean calendar	1932
Minguo calendar	2313 before ROC 民前2313年
Nanakshahi calendar	−1869
Thai solar calendar	141–142
Tibetan calendar	阳土虎年 (male Earth-Tiger) −275 or −656 or −1428 — to — 阴土兔年 (female Earth-Rabbit) −274 or −655 or −1427

Year 402 BC was a year of the pre-Julian Roman calendar. At the time, it was known as the Year of the Tribunate of Ahala, Cornutus, Fidenas, Capitolinus, Esquilinus and Fidenas (or, less frequently, year 352 Ab urbe condita). The denomination 402 BC for this year has been used since the early medieval period, when the Anno Domini calendar era became the prevalent method in Europe for naming years.

== Events ==
=== By place ===
==== Greece ====
- Archelaus I, King of Macedonia, helps establish a pro-Macedonian oligarchy in Larissa in Thessaly.

== Births ==
- Phocion, Athenian statesman and general (d. c. 318 BC)

== Deaths ==
- Zhou wei lie wang, king of the Zhou dynasty of China
