= Bolgios =

Bolgios (Greek: Βόλγιος, also Bolgius, Belgius) was a Gaulish leader during the Gallic invasion of the Balkans who led an invasion of Macedon and Illyria in 279 BC, killing the Macedonian king Ptolemy Keraunos.

He was part of a force of Gauls settled in Pannonia who had advanced to Thrace under a leader called Cambaules. Deciding on fresh conquests, they sent separate forces to different regions: one led by Cerethrius against the Thracians and Triballi; another against Paionia led by Brennus and Acichorius; and a third against the Macedonians and Illyrians, led by Bolgios.

The Macedonian king, Ptolemy Keraunos, was unconcerned by the approaching army, and declined an offer of 20,000 soldiers from the Dardanians. Bolgios sent ambassadors to Ptolemy, demanding payment to call off the attack. Ptolemy refused, instead demanding that the Gauls give him hostages and hand over their arms. Battle followed a few days later, where the Macedonians were severely defeated. Ptolemy was captured and beheaded, and his head was paraded around the army on a spear.

The Gauls did not follow up their victory, and Sosthenes, a Macedonian nobleman, took command, assembled an army and forced them to withdraw, although he was defeated by Brennus' contingent soon afterwards. The combined Gaulish army under Brennus and Acichorius then mounted an invasion of Greece, defeating a combined Greek army at Thermopylae and advancing to Delphi, where they were routed.

Historian John T. Koch has suggested that Bolgios had become quasi-deified by the Late Iron Age, and the ethnonym of the "Belgae" refers to their claiming ancestry from him. Their invasion of Britain created an association of noble ancestry being traced back to him, and thus he is also the original figure behind Beli Mawr.
