= Antipater Etesias =

King of Macedonia in 279 BC

Antipater II Etesias

King of Macedonia
- Reign: 279 BC (45 days)
- Predecessor: Meleager
- Successor: Sosthenes
- Born: 3rd c. BC
- Died: 3rd c. BC
- Greek: Ἀντίπατρος Ἐτησίας, Ἀntípatros Ἐtēsías
- House: Antipatrid dynasty
- Father: Philip (son of Antipater)

Antipater Etesias (Greek: Ἀντίπατρος Ἐτησίας, Ἀntípatros Ἐtēsías) was a king of Macedon. He was the son of Cassander's brother Phillip. He became king after the death of Ptolemy Keraunos and the ousting of Meleager. His reign lasted only a period of 45 days. The Macedonians gave Antipater the name Etesias, because the etesian winds blew during the short time that he was king. He failed as the leader of the army and was deposed by Sosthenes, possibly an officer in the army of Lysimachus in the 280s or 279 BC. Despite this he still had a following in some parts of Macedon and was defeated by Antigonus II Gonatas. After this he fled to Egypt where he is mentioned 20 years later, encouraged by the king Ptolemy III Euergetes as a potential rival claimant to the Macedonian throne.

== Sources ==
- Pyrrhus, King of Epirus by Petros E. Garoufalias ISBN 0-905743-13-X
- A History of Macedonia: Volume III, 336-167 BC by N. G. L. Hammond and F. W. Walbank (1988)

Antipater Etesias Antipatrid dynasty Born: Unknown Died: Unknown
Preceded by Meleager	King of Macedon; 279 BC	Succeeded by Sosthenes
