= Portico of the Aetolians =

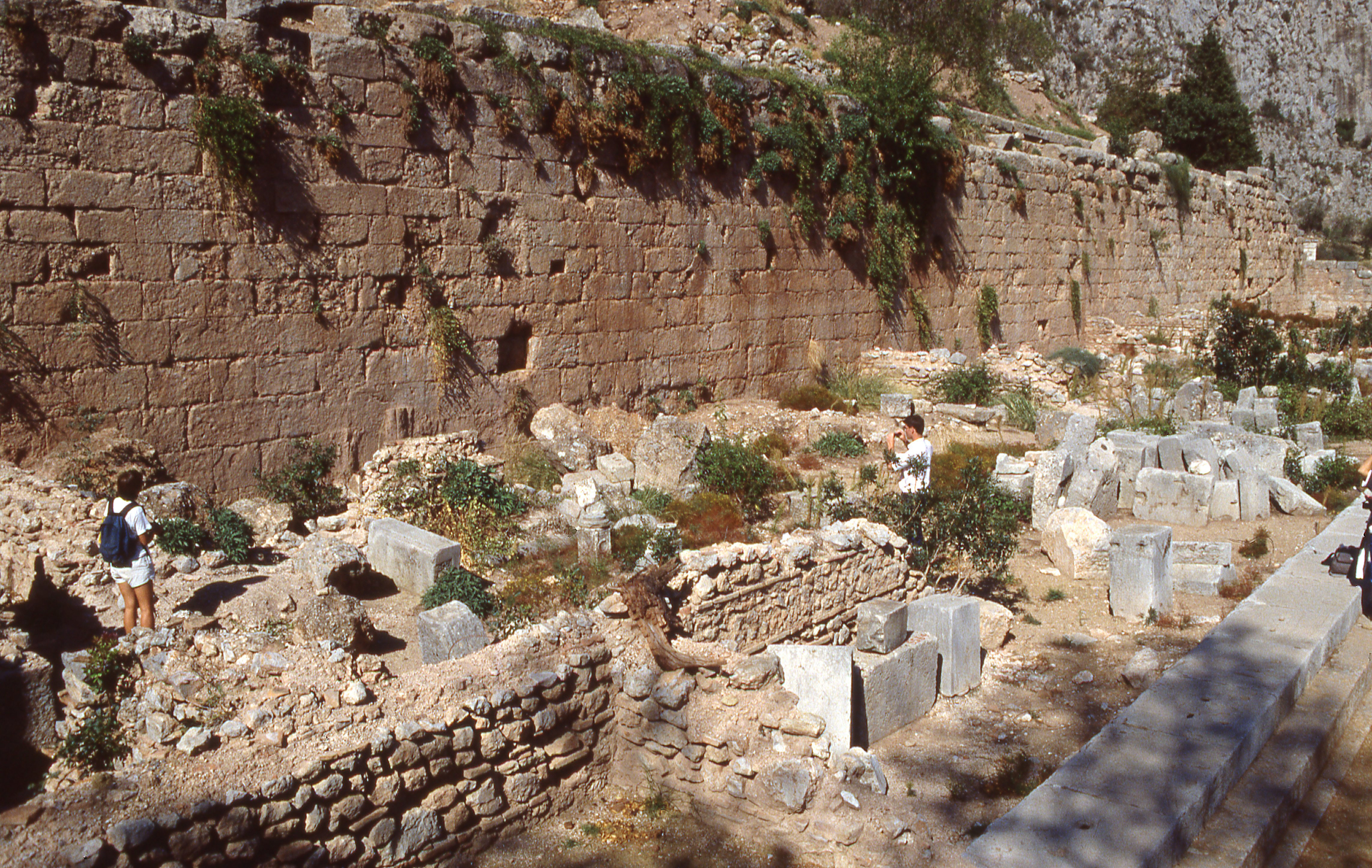
The view of the Portico

The Portico of the Aetolians, known also as the Western Portico, is one of the largest buildings of Delphi, situated outside of the sacred precinct of the sanctuary of Apollo.

== Description ==
The Portico of the Aetolians is a large portico situated to the west of the sacred precinct of Apollo in Delphi. It measures 72.60 metres (238.2 ft) in length and 11.60 metres (38.1 ft) in width. It was provided with a double colonnade: the exterior one comprised 29 columns and the interior one 15. It was probably constructed initially in the 4th century BC. However, it has been associated with the Aetolian League and its increased power and influence over Delphi in the 3rd century BC. The reason for this might be that it sheltered arms dedicated by the Aetolians as part of their booty after their victory over the Galatians.

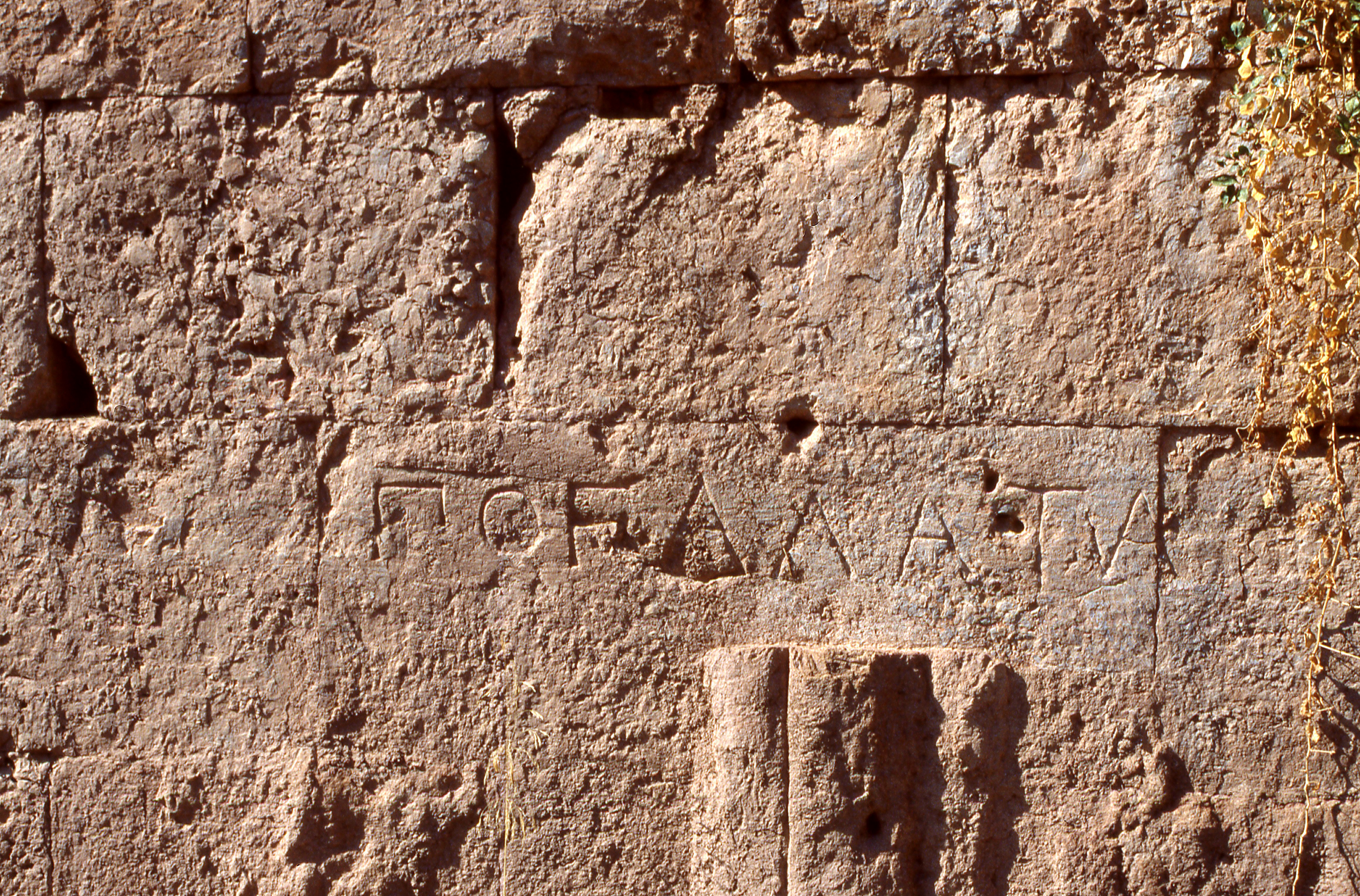
A part of the inscription recording the dedication by the Aetolians of arms captured from the Gauls

Several interpretations of the monument have seen the light. A detailed study of the remains offered a fascinating glimpse over the way in which the arms and armours were fastened to the monument in order to be displayed. Some scholars think that it might have been used as an arsenal from the beginning, whereas others conclude that it acquired this use only after the Galatian invasions. There is a general consensus that the building was associated with the deliberate effort of the Aetolian League to be commemorated within the sanctuary through a series of ex-votos and minor monuments established in the site at their instigation.

== Bibliography ==
- Amandry, P., 1978,« Consécration d’armes galates à Delphes », BCH, 102, pp. 571–586.
- Amandry, P.,1981, «Chronique delphique : portique Ouest, stade, fontaines», BCH, 105, pp. 708, 729–732.
- Bommelaer, J.-F.,1993, « Les Portiques de Delphes », RA, pp. 33–51.
- Bommelaer, J.-F., Laroche, D., 1991,Guide de Delphes. Le site, Sites et Monuments 7, Paris, 218–220.
- Jacquemin, A., 1985, Aitolia et Aristaineta. Offrandes monumentales étoliennes à Delphes au iiie s. av. J.-C., Ktèma, 10, pp. 27–35.
- Jacquemin, A., 1999, Offrandes monumentales à Delphes, BEFAR, 304.
- Knoepfler, D., 2009, De Delphes à Thermos : un témoignage épigraphique méconnu sur le trophée galate des Étoliens dans leur capitale (le traité étolo-béotien), CRAI, pp. 1215–1253.
- La Coste-Messelière, P. (de), 1923, Chronique des fouilles, BCH 47, pp. 516–518.
- La Coste-Messelière, P. (de), 1925, Inscriptions de Delphes, BCH, 49, pp. 75–99.
- Perrier, A., 2011, « Le portique dit ‘des Etoliens’ à Delphes: Bilan et perspectives”, Pallas 87, pp. 39–56
- Roux, G.,1989, « Problèmes delphiques d’architecture et d’épigraphie. II. Hoplothèque. Tholos et portique Ouest», RA, pp. 36–62.
