= Trimarcisia =

Ancient Celtic military tactic

Trimarcisia (Ancient Greek: τριμαρκισία, trimarkisia; 'feat of three horsemen') was an ancient Celtic military cavalry tactic or organisation; it is attested in Pausanias's Description of Greece, where he describes the use of trimarcisia by the Gauls during their invasion of Greece in the third century BCE.

According to Pausanias:

When the Gallic horsemen were engaged, the servants remained behind the ranks and proved useful in the following way. Should a horseman or his horse fall, the slave brought him a horse to mount; if the rider was killed, the slave mounted the horse in his master's place; if both rider and horse were killed, there was a mounted man ready. When a rider was wounded, one slave brought back to camp the wounded man, while the other took his vacant place in the ranks.

Pausanias's view was that the Gauls had adopted this method of fighting by copying the Persian Athanatoi elite force with the difference that while the Persians waited until after a battle to replace their casualties, the Gauls "kept reinforcing their full number during the height of the action".

== Etymology ==
According to Pausanias, marka was the Celtic name for a horse. This corresponds to the root *mark-os of words for 'saddle horse' attested in Celtic and Germanic but not in other Indo-European languages, a root that is of uncertain etymology.
