= Celtic settlement of Southeast Europe =

Military campaigns and settlements of Celtic peoples in southeastern Europe

Ethnogenesis and migrations of the Volcae.

Gallic groups, originating from the various La Tène chiefdoms, began a movement into Southeast Europe from the 4th century BC. Although Gallic settlements were concentrated in the western half of the Carpathian basin, there were notable incursions and settlements within the Balkans.

From their new bases in northern Illyria and Pannonia, the Gallic invasions climaxed in the early 3rd century BC, with the invasion of Greece. The 279 BC invasion of Greece was preceded by a series of earlier military campaigns waged in the southern Balkans favoured by the state of confusion ensuing from the Diadochi Wars after the death of Alexander the Great. After their final defeat in Greece, a part of the invading Celts crossed over to Anatolia in 270s BC, and eventually settled in the area that came to be named after them as Galatia.

== Celtic settlements along the Danube ==
From the 4th century BC, Celtic groups pushed into the Carpathian region and the Danube basin, coinciding with their movement into Italy. The Boii and Volcae were two large Celtic confederacies who generally cooperated in their campaigns. Splinter groups moved south via two major routes: one following the Danube, another eastward from Italy. According to legend, 300,000 Celts moved into Italy and Illyria. By the 3rd century, the native inhabitants of Pannonia were almost completely Celticized. La Tène remains are found widely in Pannonia, but finds westward beyond the Tisza and south beyond the Sava are rather sparse. These finds are deemed to have been locally produced Norican-Pannonian variation of Celtic culture. Nevertheless, features are encountered that suggest ongoing contacts with distant provinces such as Iberia. The fertile lands around the Pannonian rivers enabled the Celts to establish themselves easily, developing their agriculture and pottery, and at the same time exploiting the rich mines of modern Poland. Thus, it appears that the Celts had created a new homeland for themselves in the southern part of Central Europe; in a region stretching from Poland to the Danube.

== Early expeditions in the Balkans ==
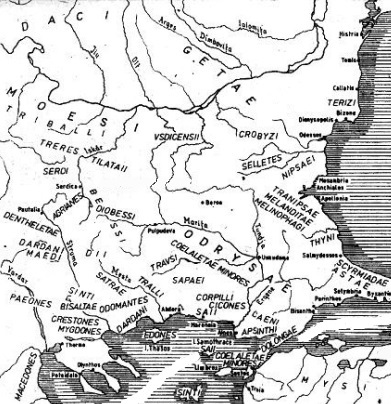
The routes taken by the Gauls

The political situation in the northern Balkans was in constant flux with various tribes dominant over their neighbours at any one time. Within tribes, military expeditions were conducted by "an enterprising and mobile warrior class able from time to time to conquer large areas and to exploit their population". The political situation in the Balkans during the 4th century BC played to the Celts' advantage. The Illyrians had been waging war against the Greeks, leaving their western flank weak. Early Celtic expeditions were concentrated against Illyrian tribes. The first Balkan tribe to be defeated by the Celts was the Illyrian Autariatae, who, during the 4th century BC, had enjoyed a hegemony over much of the central Balkans, centred on the Morava valley. An account of Celtic tactics is revealed in their attacks on the Ardiaei.

As long as Alexander the Great ruled Macedon, the Celts did not dare to push south towards Greece. In 335 BC, the Celts sent representatives to pay homage to Alexander the Great, while Macedon was engaged in wars against Thracians on its northern border. Some historians suggest that this 'diplomatic' act was actually an evaluation of Macedonian military might. After the death of Alexander the Great, Celtic armies began to bear down on the southern regions, threatening the kingdom of Macedonia and the rest of Greece.

In 310 BC, the Celtic general Molistomos attacked deep into Illyrian territory, trying to subdue Dardanians, Paeonians and Triballi. However Molistomos was defeated by the Dardanians. The new Macedonian king Cassander felt compelled to take some of his old Illyrian enemies under his protection even though the Illyrians emerged victorious. In 298 BC, the Celts attempted a penetrating attack into Thrace and Macedon, where they suffered a heavy defeat near Haemus Mons at the hands of Cassander. However, another body of Celts led by the general Cambaules marched on Thrace, capturing large areas. The Celtic tribe of the Serdi lived in Thrace and founded the city of Serdica, present day Sofia.

== Great expedition in Greece ==
In 281 BC, the collapse of Lysimachus's kingdom opened the way for the migration. The cause for this is explained by Pausanias as greed for loot, by Justin as a result of overpopulation, and by Memnon as the result of famine. According to Pausanias, an initial probing raid led by Cambaules withdrew when they realized they were too few in numbers. In 280 BC, a great Celtic army of about 85,000 warriors left Pannonia, split into three divisions, and marched south in a great expedition. The first division under Cerethrius leading 20,000 men moved against the Thracians and Triballi. Another division, led by Brennus and Acichorius moved against Paeonia. The third division, headed by Bolgios, aimed for Macedon and Illyria.

=== Invasion of Macedon ===
In the following battle against the Makedonians, the Gauls captured and decapitated the young king, Ptolemy Keraunos, son of Ptolemy I. However, Bolgios's contingent was repulsed by the Macedonian nobleman Sosthenes, and satisfied with the loot they had won, Bolgios's contingents turned back. Sosthenes, in turn, was attacked and defeated by Brennus and his division, who were then free to ravage the countryside but not the walled cities since they lacked any kind of siege equipment.

=== Battle of Thermopylae (279 BC) ===
After these expeditions returned home, Brennus urged and persuaded them to mount a third united expedition against central Greece, led by himself and Acichorius, in order to sack Delphi. The reported strength of the army of 152,000 infantry and 24,400 cavalry is impossibly large. The actual number of horsemen has to be intended half as big: Pausanias describes how they used a tactic called trimarcisia, where each cavalryman was supported by two mounted servants, who could supply him with a spare horse should he have to be dismounted, or take his place in the battle, should he be killed or wounded.

A coalition made up of Aetolians, Boeotians, Athenians, Phocians, Locrians and other Greeks north of Peloponnese, took up quarters at the narrow pass of Thermopylae, on the east coast of central Greece. During the initial assaults at the narrow pass, Brennus's forces suffered heavy losses by the Greek hoplites and skirmishers.

==== Invasion of Aetolia ====
Hence Brennus decided to send a large force under Acichorius to invade Aetolia. The Aetolian detachment, as Brennus hoped, left Thermopylae to defend their homes. The invading Gauls destroyed Callium, but Aetolians joined the defence en masse – the old and women joining the fight. Realizing that the Gallic sword was dangerous only at close quarters, the Aetolians resorted to skirmishing tactics. According to Pausanias, only half the number that had set out for Aetolia returned.

Meanwhile, Brennus found eventually a way around the pass at Thermopylae and captured it. However, by then the Greeks had already managed to escape by sea thanks to the Athenian navy.

=== Battle of Delphi ===
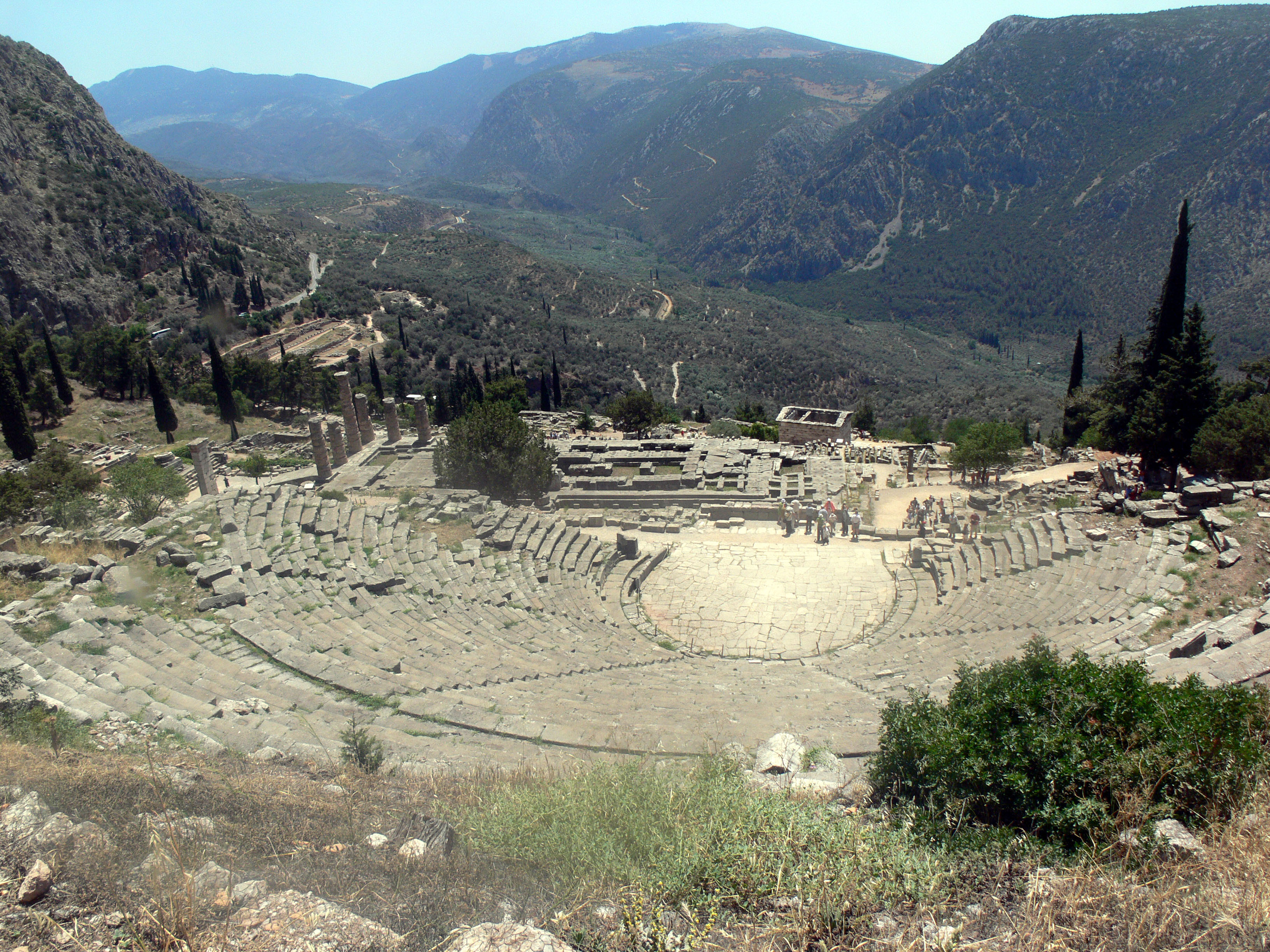
Delphi

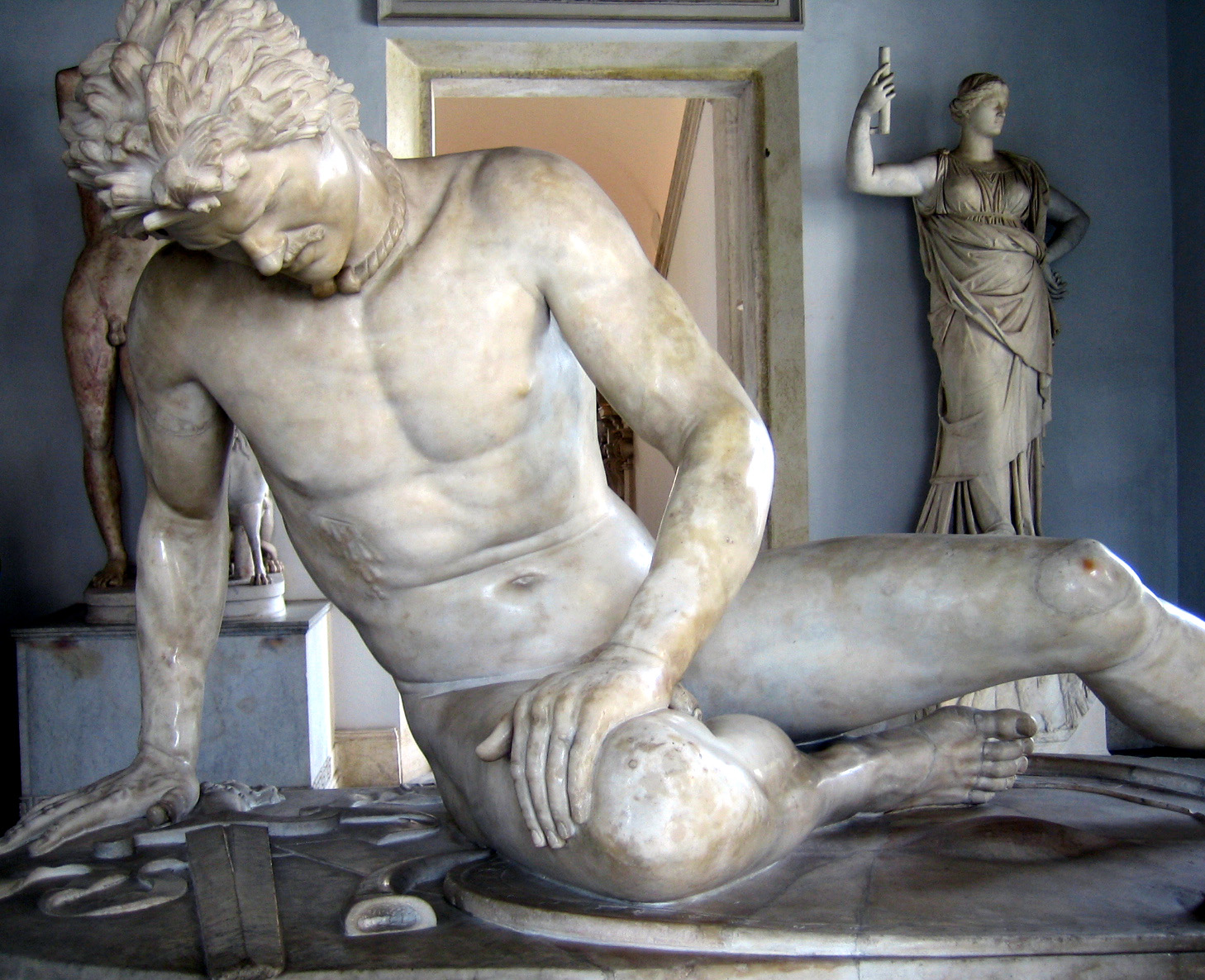
The Dying Gaul, a Roman copy of a Greek statue commemorating the victory over the Galatians

After the capture of Thermopylae, Brennus pushed on to sack Delphi, which was then a member of the Aetolian League. Both historians who relate the attack on Delphi, Pausanias and Junianus Justinus, say that the Gauls were defeated and driven off. They were overtaken by a violent thunderstorm, which made it impossible to manoeuvre or even hear their orders. The night that followed was frosty, and in the morning the Greeks attacked them from both sides. Brennus was wounded and the Gauls fell back, killing those of their own wounded who were unable to retreat. That night, a panic fell on the camp, as the Gauls divided into factions and fought amongst themselves. They were joined by Acichorius and the rest of the army, but the Greeks forced them into a full-scale retreat. Brennus took his own life by drinking neat wine according to Pausanias, or by stabbing himself according to Justinus. Pressed by the Aetolians, the Gauls fell back to the river Spercheios, where they were routed by the Thessalians and Malians.

== Tylis in Thrace ==
Most scholars deem the Greek campaign a disaster for the Celts. Some of the survivors of the Greek campaign, led by Comontoris (one of Brennus's generals) settled in Thrace. In 277 BC, Antigonus II Gonatas defeated the Gauls at the Battle of Lysimachia and the survivors retreated, founding a short-lived city-state in Thrace named Tyle.

== Galatia in Asia Minor ==
Another group of Gauls, who split off from Brennus's army in 281 BC, were transported over to Asia Minor by Nicomedes I to help him defeat his brother and secure the throne of Bithynia. They eventually settled in the region that came to be named after them, Galatia. They were defeated by the Seleucid Empire under Antiochus I, and as a result, they were confined to barren highlands in the centre of Anatolia.

== Northern Balkans ==
Celtic groups were still the pre-eminent political units in the northwestern Balkans from the 4th to the 1st century BC. The Boii controlled most of northern Pannonia during the 2nd century BC, and are also mentioned as having occupied the territory of modern Slovakia. We learn of other tribes of the Boian confederation inhabiting Pannonia. There were the Taurisci in the upper Sava valley, west of Sisak, as well as the Anarti, Osi and Cotini in the Carpathian basin. In the lower Sava valley, the Scordisci wielded much power over their neighbours for over a century.

The later half of the 1st century BC brought much change to the power relations of barbarian tribes in Pannonia. The defeat of the Boian confederation by the Geto-Dacian king Burebista significantly curtailed Celtic control of the Carpathian basin, and some of the Celticization was reversed. However, more Celtic tribes appear in sources. The Hercuniates and Latobici migrated from the northern regions (Germania). Altogether new tribes are encountered, bearing Latin names (such as the Arabiates), possibly representing new creations carved out of the defeated Boian confederation. To further weaken Celtic hegemony in Pannonia, the Romans moved the Pannonian-Illyrian Azali to northern Pannonia. The political dominance previously enjoyed by the Celts was overshadowed by newer barbarian confederations, such the Marcomanni and Iazyges. Their ethnic independence was gradually lost as they were absorbed by the surrounding Dacian, Illyrian and Germanic peoples, although Celtic names survive until the 3rd century AD.

== Cursed gold of Delphi ==
In spite of the Greek accounts about the defeat of the Gauls, the Roman literary tradition preferred a far different version. Strabo reports a story told in his time of a semi-legendary treasure – the aurum Tolosanum, fifteen thousand talents (450 metric tonnes/990,000 pounds) of gold and silver – supposed to have been the cursed gold looted during the sack of Delphi and brought back to Tolosa (modern Toulouse, France) by the Tectosages, who were said to have been part of the invading army.

More than a century and a half after the alleged sack, the Romans ruled Gallia Narbonensis. In 105 BC, while marching to Arausio, the Proconsul of Cisalpine Gaul Quintus Servilius Caepio plundered the sanctuaries of the town of Tolosa, whose inhabitants had joined the Cimbri, finding over 50,000 15 lb. bars of gold and 10,000 15 lb. bars of silver. The riches of Tolosa were shipped back to Rome, but only the silver made it: the gold was stolen by a band of marauders, who were believed to have been hired by Caepio himself and to have killed the legion guarding it. The Gold of Tolosa was never found, and was said to have been passed all the way down to the last heir of the Servilii Caepiones, Marcus Junius Brutus.

In 105 BC, Caepio refused to co-operate with his superior officer, Gnaeus Mallius Maximus, because he thought of him as a novus homo, deciding by himself to engage in battle against the Cimbri, on the Rhone. There, the Roman army suffered a crushing defeat and complete destruction, in the so-called Battle of Arausio (modern Orange).

Upon his return to Rome, Caepio was tried for "the loss of his Army" and embezzlement. He was convicted and given the harshest sentence allowable; he was stripped of his Roman citizenship, forbidden fire and water within 800 miles of Rome, fined 15,000 talents (about 825,000 lb) of gold, and forbidden from seeing or speaking to his friends or family until he had left for exile.

He spent the rest of his life in exile in Smyrna in Asia Minor. His defeat and ensuing ruin were looked upon as a punishment for his sacrilegious theft.

Strabo distances himself from this account, arguing that the defeated Gauls were in no position to carry off such spoils, and that, in any case, Delphi had already been despoiled of its treasure by the Phocians during the Third Sacred War in the previous century. However, Brennus's legendary pillage of Delphi is presented as fact by some popular modern historians.

== See also ==
- Celts in Transylvania
- La Tène culture
- thyreophoroi
