= Brennus (3rd century BC) =

Gallic leader who invaded Greece (died 279 BC)

Brennus (or Brennos) (died 279 BC at Delphi, Ancient Greece) was one of the Gaulish leaders of the army of the Gallic invasion of the Balkans. While invading the Greek mainland he managed to momentarily reach as far south as Delphi in an attempt to loot the rich treasury of the sanctuary of Apollo. His army suffered a devastating defeat at Delphi; he was heavily injured during the battle and committed suicide there. His army was forced to a continuous retreat by the tactical attacks of the Greek city-states and was cut down to a remaining band that fled from Greece.

In 280 BC a great army, comprising about 85,000 warriors, coming from Pannonia and split in three divisions, marched south in a 'great expedition' to the Greek mainland against Macedonia and then further south to central Greece as far south as Delphi during a failed and short-lived campaign against the Greek city-states. The division led by Brennus and Acichorius moved against the Paionians.

Some writers suppose that Brennus and Acichorius are the same person, the former being only a title and the latter the real name.

The other two divisions were led by Cerethrius and Bolgios, moving against the Thracians and Triballi, and against the Macedonians and Illyrians, respectively.

Brennus is said to have belonged to an otherwise unknown tribe called the Prausi. These Gauls had settled in Pannonia because of population increases in Gaul, and sought further conquests.

== Military campaign ==
The army was initially led by Cambaules, who led them as far as Thrace, where they stopped. When they decided to advance again in 279 BC, they split their forces into three divisions. One division was led by Cerethrius against the Thracians and Triballi; another by Bolgios against the Macedonians and Illyrians; and the third against Paionia by Brennus and Acichorius. Bolgios' expedition inflicted heavy losses on the Macedonians and killed their king, Ptolemy Keraunos, but was repulsed by the Macedonian nobleman Sosthenes. Brennus' contingent then attacked Sosthenes and defeated him, and proceeded to ravage the country. After these expeditions returned, Brennus urged a united, and potentially lucrative, attack on Greece, led by himself and Acichorius. The army numbered 152,000 infantry and 24,400 cavalry. Pausanias describes how they used a tactic called trimarcisia, where each cavalryman was supported by two mounted servants, who could supply him with a spare horse if he was dismounted, or take his place in the battle if he was killed or wounded, so the actual number of horsemen was in fact 61,200.

route of the Gauls

=== Battle of Thermopylae ===
The Greeks, mustered at Thermopylae under the Athenian general Calippus, learned that the Gauls had reached Phthiotis and Magnesia, sent their cavalry and light infantry to meet them at the river Spercheios and oppose their crossing. They broke down the bridges and camped on the bank, but that night Brennus sent 10,000 men to cross further downriver, where the river formed a marshy lake. The Gauls were strong swimmers, some of them using their shields as floats, and the river was shallow enough for the tallest to wade across. The Greeks retreated to the main army, while Brennus forced the locals to rebuild the bridges to allow the rest of his forces to cross.

The Gauls attacked the Greeks at Thermopylae, but were initially forced to retreat by their better armed opponents. Brennus sent 40,000 infantry and 800 cavalry under Combutis and Orestorius back over the Spercheius to invade Aetolia, hoping to persuade the Aetolian contingent in the Greek army to leave Thermopylae and return to defend their homeland. The plan worked, but the returning Aetolians inflicted such losses on the Gauls that less than half of them returned to Thermopylae. Meanwhile, the locals were intimidated into showing Brennus a mountain pass that would allow him to attack the Greek rear. He led 40,000 men, hidden until the last minute by fog, over the pass, and dispersed the Phoceans who were guarding the pass. However, the Phoceans informed the Greek army at Thermopylae in time to safely retreat before encirclement. The Athenian fleet evacuated the army, and Brennus marched for Delphi, not waiting for Acichorius and the rest of the army to catch up.

=== Attack on Delphi ===
Both the historians who relate the attack on Delphi, Pausanias and Justin, say the Gauls were defeated and driven off. They were overtaken by a violent thunderstorm which made it impossible to manoeuvre or even hear their orders. The night that followed was frosty, and in the morning the Greeks attacked them from both sides. Brennus was wounded and the Gauls fell back, killing their own wounded who were unable to retreat. That night a panic fell on the camp, as the Gauls divided into factions and fought amongst themselves. They were joined by Acichorius and the rest of the army, but the Greeks forced them into a full-scale retreat. Brennus killed himself, by drinking unwatered wine according to Pausanias (the Greeks believed that doing so was poisonous) or by stabbing himself according to Justinus. Pressed by the Aetolians, they fell back to the Spercheius, where they were cut to pieces by the waiting Thessalians and Malians.

=== Aftermath ===
The Gauls who escaped this defeat settled on the Hellespont in the country around Byzantium, where they founded the kingdom of Tylis, and around Ancyra where they founded the kingdom of Galatia. The Amphictyonic League instituted new games, the Delphic Soteria ("deliverance" or "salvation") to commemorate their victory.

Strabo reports a story told in his time of treasure – fifteen thousand talents of gold and silver – supposed to have been taken from Delphi and brought back to Tolosa (modern Toulouse, France) by the Tectosages, who were said to have been part of the invading army. Strabo does not believe this story, arguing that the defeated Gauls were in no position to carry off such spoils, and that in any case Delphi had already been despoiled of its treasure by the Phocians during the Third Sacred War the previous century.

== In popular culture ==
- Brennus is a playable leader of the "Celts" faction in the 2006 video game expansion Civilization IV: Warlords.
