= 318 BC =

318 BC in various calendars
- Gregorian calendar: 318 BC; CCCXVIII BC
- Ab urbe condita: 436
- Ancient Egypt era: XXXIII dynasty, 6
- Pharaoh: Ptolemy I Soter, 6
- Ancient Greek Olympiad (summer): 115th Olympiad, year 3
- Assyrian calendar: 4433
- Balinese saka calendar: N/A
- Bengali calendar: −911 – −910
- Berber calendar: 633
- Buddhist calendar: 227
- Burmese calendar: −955
- Byzantine calendar: 5191–5192
- Chinese calendar: 壬寅年 (Water Tiger); 2380 or 2173 — to — 癸卯年 (Water Rabbit); 2381 or 2174
- Coptic calendar: −601 – −600
- Discordian calendar: 849
- Ethiopian calendar: −325 – −324
- Hebrew calendar: 3443–3444
- Hindu calendars
- Vikram Samvat: −261 – −260
- Shaka Samvat: N/A
- Kali Yuga: 2783–2784
- Holocene calendar: 9683
- Iranian calendar: 939 BP – 938 BP
- Islamic calendar: 968 BH – 967 BH
- Javanese calendar: N/A
- Julian calendar: N/A
- Korean calendar: 2016
- Minguo calendar: 2229 before ROC 民前2229年
- Nanakshahi calendar: −1785
- Thai solar calendar: 225–226
- Tibetan calendar: ཆུ་ཕོ་སྟག་ལོ་ (male Water-Tiger) −191 or −572 or −1344 — to — ཆུ་མོ་ཡོས་ལོ་ (female Water-Hare) −190 or −571 or −1343

Year 318 BC was a year of the pre-Julian Roman calendar. At the time, it was known as the Year of the Consulship of Flaccinator and Venno (or, less frequently, year 436 Ab urbe condita). The denomination 318 BC for this year has been used since the early medieval period, when the Anno Domini calendar era became the prevalent method in Europe for naming years.

== Events ==
=== By place ===
==== Macedonian Empire ====
- Antigonus resolves to become lord of all Asia, and in conjunction with Cassander and Ptolemy. He enters into negotiations with Eumenes; but Eumenes remains faithful to the royal house. He raises an army and forms a coalition with the satraps of the eastern provinces. He then captures Babylon from Antigonus.
- Antigonus marches against Eumenes, so Eumenes withdraws east to join the satraps of the provinces beyond the Tigris River.
- Cassander, who has allied himself with Ptolemy and Antigonus, declares war on the regent, Polyperchon. Most of the Greek states support him, including Athens. Cassander further effects an alliance with Eurydice, the ambitious wife of King Philip III Arrhidaeus of Macedon.
- Although Polyperchon is initially successful in securing control of the Greek cities, whose freedom he proclaims, his fleet is destroyed by Antigonus.

==== Greece ====
- In a power struggle in Athens after the death of Antipater, Phocion is deposed as the ruler of Athens, convicted of treason, and executed by those Athenians hoping to restore democracy to the city. Shortly afterward, the Athenians decree a public burial and a statue in his honor.

==== China ====
- The state of Qin moves into the Sichuan basin, giving them control of that great food-producing plain.

=== By topic ===
==== Music ====
- Aristoxenus, a Greek peripatetic philosopher, and writer on music and rhythm, and a pupil of Aristotle, writes a treatise on music called the "Elements of Harmony".

== Deaths ==
- Phocion, Athenian statesman and general (b. c. 402 BC)
- Cleitus the White, Officer of Alexander the Great
