= Aristotimus =

3rd-century BC tyrant of Elis

Aristotimus was a tyrant of the ancient Greek city of Elis. He was installed by the Macedonian king Antigonus II Gonatas in 272 BC and ruled only a few months during which he committed many outrageous crimes, driving 800 citizens into exile. He was killed by Hellanicus, Cylon and other conspirators who were subsequently honoured by the Aetolians with a statue erected at Olympia.
