= 288 BC =

288 BC in various calendars
- Gregorian calendar: 288 BC; CCLXXXVIII BC
- Ab urbe condita: 466
- Ancient Egypt era: XXXIII dynasty, 36
- Pharaoh: Ptolemy I Soter, 36
- Ancient Greek Olympiad (summer): 123rd Olympiad (victor)¹
- Assyrian calendar: 4463
- Balinese saka calendar: N/A
- Bengali calendar: −881 – −880
- Berber calendar: 663
- Buddhist calendar: 257
- Burmese calendar: −925
- Byzantine calendar: 5221–5222
- Chinese calendar: 壬申年 (Water Monkey); 2410 or 2203 — to — 癸酉年 (Water Rooster); 2411 or 2204
- Coptic calendar: −571 – −570
- Discordian calendar: 879
- Ethiopian calendar: −295 – −294
- Hebrew calendar: 3473–3474
- Hindu calendars
- Vikram Samvat: −231 – −230
- Shaka Samvat: N/A
- Kali Yuga: 2813–2814
- Holocene calendar: 9713
- Iranian calendar: 909 BP – 908 BP
- Islamic calendar: 937 BH – 936 BH
- Javanese calendar: N/A
- Julian calendar: N/A
- Korean calendar: 2046
- Minguo calendar: 2199 before ROC 民前2199年
- Nanakshahi calendar: −1755
- Seleucid era: 24/25 AG
- Thai solar calendar: 255–256
- Tibetan calendar: ཆུ་ཕོ་སྤྲེ་ལོ་ (male Water-Monkey) −161 or −542 or −1314 — to — ཆུ་མོ་བྱ་ལོ་ (female Water-Bird) −160 or −541 or −1313

Year 288 BC was a year of the pre-Julian Roman calendar. At the time it was known as the Year of the Consulship of Tremulus and Arvina (or, less frequently, year 466 Ab urbe condita). The denomination 288 BC for this year has been used since the early medieval period, when the Anno Domini calendar era became the prevalent method in Europe for naming years.

== Events ==
=== By place ===
==== Greece ====
- The Macedonian King, Demetrius Poliorcetes, faces a combined attack from Lysimachus and Phyrrhus, king of Epirus, after Seleucus, Ptolemy and Lysimachus form a coalition to block plans by Demetrius to invade Asia Minor.

Ptolemy's fleet appears off Greece, inciting the cities to revolt.

- Athens revolts and Demetrius besieges the city. Pyrrhus takes Thessaly and the western half of Macedonia and, with the assistance of Ptolemy's fleet, relieves Athens from Demetrius' siege.
- After the Egyptian fleet participates decisively in the liberation of Athens from Macedonian occupation, Ptolemy obtains the protectorate over the League of Islanders, which includes most of the Greek islands in the Aegean Sea. Egypt's maritime supremacy in the Mediterranean in the ensuing decades is based on this alliance.

==== Sicily ====
- Following the death of Agathocles, some of his disbanded mercenaries seize Messana in northeast Sicily and set up a society, calling themselves Mamertines (Sons of Mars). The city becomes a base from which they will ravage the Sicilian countryside.

==== Sri Lanka ====
- The Jaya Sri Maha Bodhi Sacred Fig tree is planted at Anuradhapura, Sri Lanka. This is the earliest known planting date for any planted tree still surviving.

==== China ====
- King Zhao of Qin and King Min of Qi take the title "Di", (帝 literally emperor), of the west and east respectively. They swear a covenant and begin planning an attack on the State of Zhao.
- Qi conquers the State of Song.
