= Acichorius =

3rd-century BC Gallic ruler

- Occupation: Leader of the Gauls
- Known for: Invaded Thrace and Macedonia

Acichorius (Ancient Greek: Ακιχώριος) was one of the leaders of the Gauls, who invaded Thrace and Macedonia in 280 BC. He and Brennus commanded the division that marched into Paionia. In the following year, 279, he accompanied Brennus in his invasion of Greece. Some writers suppose that Brennus and Acichorius are the same persons, the former being only a title and the latter the real name.
