= Sosthenes of Macedon =

King of Macedon from 279 to 277 BC

Sosthenes
- Strategos

King-elect of Macedonia
- Reign: 279–277 BC
- Predecessor: Antipater Etesias
- Successor: Antigonus II Gonatas
- Died: 277 BC

Sosthenes (Greek Σωσθένης; died 277 BC) was a Macedonian general who may have been a king of the Antipatrid dynasty. During the reign of Lysimachus he was his governor in Asia Minor. Sosthenes was elected King by the Macedonian army, but he may or not have reigned as king. Appointed as strategos he may have declined the title of king as he had no royal connections. During his reign, he faced invading Galatians, Antigonus II Gonatas and other rivals. He defeated Bolgius, one of the earliest invading Galatian leaders but was soon faced with the invasion of Brennus in the summer of 279 BC. Antigonus II Gonatas tried to invade Macedonia from Asia in 278 but was beaten by Sosthenes.

== Citations ==
Sosthenes of Macedon Born: Unknown Died: 277 BC
Preceded by Antipater Etesias	King of Macedon; 279–277 BC	Succeeded by Antigonus II Gonatas
