= Cerethrius =

Cerethrius was a Gallic king in Thrace. He was defeated in 277 BC, by Antigonus II Gonatas at the Battle of Lysimachia.
