= Heli (name) =

- Gender: female
- Language: Estonian; Finnish
- Name day: 22 February (Estonia); 20 February (Finland)

Other names
- Cognates: Helen, Helena
- Related names: Häli, Hela, Helin, Helina, Helinä, Helis

Heli is a Finnish and Estonian female given name.

It reached the peak of its popularity in the middle of the 20th century in Finland. As of December 2012, there are more than 17,000 people registered in Finland with this name.

== Given name ==
- Heli Berg (born 1953), Swedish politician
- Héli Chatelain (1859–1908), Swiss linguist and Protestant missionary
- Heli Daruwala, Indian actress in television series such as Nisha Aur Uske Cousins, Suvreen Guggal, Love U Zindagi
- Heli Jantunen (born 1958), Finnish electrical engineer researching electroceramics for telecommunications
- Heli Järvinen (born 1963), Finnish politician
- Heli Jukkola (born 1979), Finnish orienteering competitor
- Heli Koivula Kruger (born 1975), Finnish track & field athlete
- Heli Laaksonen (born 1972), Finnish writer, poet and performer
- Heli Lääts (1932–2018), Estonian singer
- Heli Rantanen (born 1970), Finnish javelin thrower
- Heli Simpson (born 1987), Australian actress and singer
- Heli Speek (born 1948), Estonian documentary filmmaker
- Heli Susi (1929–2020), Estonian teacher and translator

== Surname ==
- Peter Heli (born 1969), Estonian skier and floorball player
