= Llefelys =

Welsh mythological character

Llefelys (Middle Welsh orthography Llevelys, Lleuelys, Llefelis) is a character in Welsh mythology appearing in the medieval Welsh tale Cyfranc Lludd a Llefelys. In the tale, Llefelys is king of Gaul while his brother Lludd is king of Britain. The tale appears in the Red Book of Hergest and the White Book of Rhydderch, the source texts for the Mabinogion, and embedded into various versions of the Brut y Brenhinedd, the Welsh adaptation of Geoffrey of Monmouth's Historia Regum Britanniae.

== Etymology ==
The name Llefelys seems to have been derived from Cligueillus (also spelled Digueillus and Eligueillus in various manuscripts), a character found in Geoffrey of Monmouth's famous pseudo-history Historia Regum Britanniae, which was early on translated into Welsh as the Brut y Brenhinedd. Geoffrey makes Cligueillus/Digueillus/Eligueillus the father of Heli and grandfather of Lud, (the prototype of Lludd), Cassibellaunus, and Nennius. In the Welsh Brut y Brenhinedd, Geoffrey's Heli son of Cligueillus becomes Beli son Manogan, a figure already known to Welsh audiences due to the influence of the 9th-century Historia Brittonum. Beli is the father of Lludd, Caswallawn, and Nennwy, and Llefelys is added as a fourth son. As such Cligueillus/Llefelys may have been displaced from his position as Beli's father once the well-known figure of Beli was chosen to replace the otherwise unknown Heli.

Geoffrey's Cligueillus / Digueillus may be a corruption of the Old Welsh name Higuel (specifically, the 10th century AD king Higuel (Howel/Houuel) Bonus – i.e. Hywel Dda – mentioned in one of Geoffrey's sources, the Annales Cambriae, now Modern Welsh Hywel.

An alternate theory is that the name Llefelys is a compound, with the first element deriving from Lleu (the name is usually written as Lleuelis in the Red Book and White Book texts). Lleu is a major figure in the Fourth Branch of the Mabinogi, and is counterpart to the Irish mythological figure Lugh and the Gaulish god Lugus. Lludd is also probably related to an earlier pan-Celtic figure, represented by the Irish Nuada and the British Nodens, via the earlier form Nudd. Elements of Lludd and Llefelys bear some similarity with the Irish story of Nuada and Lugh, particularly the narrative Cath Maige Tuired. Like Llefelys, Lugh is dispossessed while the kingdom (in this case Ireland) is ruled by his kinsman Nuada. Eventually the kingdom is beset by oppressors and both fertility and the food supply are affected, but Lugh returns to overcome the oppression with his vast skill and knowledge.

== Role ==
In the Lludd and Llefelys narrative, Lludd inherits the kingship of Britain from his father, Beli, and shortly thereafter helps his brother Llefelys marry the king's daughter of France. Llefelys becomes King of France, but Lludd must soon request his aid when Britain is beset by three menaces: the Coraniaid, a mysterious people who can hear everything; a terrible scream that is heard every May Eve, terrifying the people and causing pregnant women to miscarry; and the continual disappearance of the provisions of the king's court. Llefelys provides his brother with solutions to each problem. He advises Lludd to mix a potion of crushed insects that will destroy the Coraniaid. The scream, he reveals, comes from two dragons fighting, so Lludd must set a trap for them and bury them beneath Dinas Emrys. The final problem is caused by an enchanter who puts Lludd's court to sleep; Lludd must defeat him in combat. Lludd makes good use of his brother's advice and overcomes each obstacle.

Mention is made of the "short discussion of Lludd and Llefelys" (ymarwar Llud a Llefelis) in a poem called Ymarwar Llud Bychan from the Book of Taliesin and the same phrase is repeated in a poem by Llywelyn Fardd.
