= Heli =

Heli, also heli, heli- may refer to:

== People ==
- Heli, King of Britain (mythical)
- Heli (biblical figure), listed as an ancestor of Jesus
- Heli (name)

== Places ==
- Heli, Tangyuan County (鹤立镇), town in Tangyuan County, Heilongjiang, China
- Heli, Funing County, Jiangsu (合利镇), town in Funing County, Jiangsu, China
- an old name for the town of Ely, England
- a parish in the municipality Spydeberg, Norway.
- "-hely" is Hungarian for "village" and is part of some Hungarian placenames

== Companies ==
- Heli Malongo Airways, an airline from Angola

== Other uses ==
- Heli (film), a 2013 Mexican film
- slang for helicopter
- also may mean a weapon used by Kronos (or Cronus) the titan

== A prefix of a word ==
heli- indicating a reference to helicopters; examples may or may not be hyphenated according to local or popular usage:

- helipad, also heli-pad
- heli-ski, also heliski
- helibus
- helicase
- helidrome
- heliman
- helipilot
- heliport
- heliscoop
- helistop
- helitaxi
