= Afallach =

Figure in Welsh mythology

Afallach (Old Welsh Aballac) is a man's name found in several medieval Welsh genealogies, where he is made the son of Beli Mawr. According to a medieval Welsh triad, Afallach was the father of the goddess Modron. The Welsh redactions of Geoffrey of Monmouth's Historia Regum Britanniae, Brut y Brenhinedd, associate him with Ynys Afallach, which is substituted as the Welsh name for Geoffrey's Insula Avalonsis (Island of Avalon), but this is fanciful medieval etymology and it is more likely his name derives from the Welsh word afall "apple tree" (modern Welsh afal "apple", afallen "apple tree" cf. Proto-Celtic *aballo- "apple"); from which, granted, the name of Avalon is also often thought to derive, so that the meaning of "Afallach" is associated but not necessarily directly. In the tale of Urien and Modron he is referred to by his daughter as the King of Annwn, therefore he may originally been cognate with Arawn or Gwyn or perhaps all three were once regional variants of the same Deity.
