= Coraniaid =

Legendary race from Welsh mythology

The Coraniaid [kɔˈranjaid] are a race of beings from Welsh mythology. They appear in the Middle Welsh prose tale Lludd and Llefelys, which survives in the Mabinogion and inserted into several texts of the Brut y Brenhinedd, a Welsh adaptation of Geoffrey of Monmouth's Historia Regum Britanniae. The Coraniaid figure in the tale as one of three plagues that affect Britain during the reign of King Lludd. They are characterized by a sense of hearing so acute that they can hear any word the wind touches, making action against them impossible.

== Name and description ==
The name Coraniaid appears to be related to the Welsh word corrach (plural corachod), translated as "dwarf", and its adjective form corachaidd, translated as "stunted" or "dwarfish". Middle Welsh orthographical variants include Coranyeit and Coranneit.

In the tale, the Coraniaid cannot be injured because their hearing is so sharp that they can hear any sound that the wind carries, and can thus avoid danger. With the help of a long horn that muffles their conversation, Lludd asks his brother Llefelys, king of France, for advice on the problem. Llefelys tells him that a certain insect crushed up and mixed with water is deadly to the Coraniaid, but harmless to the Britons. Lludd crushes up the insects and calls a meeting of all his people and all the Coraniaid, then throws the concoction over the whole crowd, thereby killing the Coraniaid without harming his people. He saves some of the insects for breeding in case the plague ever returns to Britain.

== Other appearances ==
The Coraniaid also appear in the Welsh Triads. Triad 36, which clearly refers back to Lludd and Llefelys, calls them one of the "Three Oppressions" that arrived in Britain and stayed there, and adds that they "came from Asia".

In a triad found in the infamous third series of Welsh Triads printed in The Myvyrian Archaiology of Wales (1801–1807), purportedly from a medieval manuscript but now known to be a forgery by Iolo Morganwg, the Coraniad are said to have settled near the Humber where they joined the Romans and Saxons against the Britons. Manley Pope, author of an 1862 translation of the Brut y Brenhinedd containing Lludd and Llefelys, follows the information given in Morganwg's triads and adds that they came from the country of Pwyll (i.e., Annwn). He further associates the Coraniaid with the Corieltauvi tribe of the East Midlands, and attributes to them the various placenames including the element pool (from Pwyll) around Britain, including Welshpool. Linguistically, this is improbable: The native Welsh name for Welshpool is Y Trallwng, for instance, and the English name Welshpool is comparatively recent. In her translation of the Mabinogion, Davies (2007) notes that Coraniaid may be a name for the Romans – otherwise Cesariaid, and records that other Triads of the Isle of Britain name the three plagues as Coraniaid, Gwyddyl Ffichti (Goidelic Picts), and Saxons.
