= Brynley F. Roberts =

Welsh writer (1931–2023)

Brynley Francis Roberts CBE FLSW (3 February 1931 – 14 August 2023), known as Bryn Roberts, was a Welsh scholar and critic, who wrote significantly on the Welsh language and Celtic history. He was Professor of Welsh Language and Literature at the University of Wales, Swansea 1978–1985 and Librarian of the National Library of Wales in 1985–1994, then made editor of the Dictionary of Welsh Biography in 1987 and of Y Traethodydd in 1999. He was on the council of the Honourable Society of Cymmrodorion and involved in the Morfa Chapel, Aberystwyth, part of the Presbyterian Church of Wales. In 2011, he was elected as a Fellow of the Learned Society of Wales.

Roberts died on 14 August 2023, at the age of 92.

== Bibliography ==
=== As author ===
- Edward Lhuyd (G.J. Williams Memorial Lecture), University of Wales Press, 14 February 1980
- Brut Tysilio, University of Wales Press, December 1980
- Gerald of Wales (Writers of Wales), University of Wales Press, 1982
- Studies on Middle Welsh Literature, Edwin Mellen Press Ltd, 1992
- Cyfannu'r rhwyg: Hanes Eglwys Salem Aberystwyth 1893-1988, Capel y Morfa, 1995
- Darlith Goffa Henry Lewis: Cadrawd - Arloeswr Llên Gwerin, University of Wales, Swansea, March 1997
- Ar Drywydd Edward Lhuyd: Darlith Flynyddol Edward Lhuyd, Y Coleg Cymraeg Cenedlaethol and The Learned Society of Wales, October 2013

=== As editor ===
- Gwassanaeth Meir, University of Wales Press, 1961
- Brut Y Brenhinedd: Llanstephan MS 1 Version (Mediaeval & Modern Welsh), Dublin Institute for Advanced Studies, December 1971
- Cyfranc Lludd a Llefelys (Mediaeval & Modern Welsh), Dublin Institute for Advanced Studies, 1975
- Early Welsh Poetry: Studies in the Book of Aneirin, National Library of Wales, 1988
- The Arthur of the Welsh: Arthurian Legend in Mediaeval Welsh Literature, edited with Rachel Bromwich and A. O. H. Jarman, University of Wales Press, 1993; new edition 1995
- Beirdd a Thywysogion: Barddoniaeth Llys yng Nghymru, Iwerddon a'r Alban, with Morfydd E. Owen, University of Wales Press, 1996
- Moelwyn: Bardd Y Ddinas Gadarn , Gwasg Pantycelyn, 1996
- The Dictionary of Welsh Biography 1941-1970, edited with R. T. Jenkins and E. D. Jones, Anrhydeddus Gymdeithas y Cymmrodorion, 2001
- Archaeologia Britannica: Texts and Translations, author Edward Lhuyd, edited with D. Wyn Evans, Celtic Studies Publications, 2007

== Sources ==
- Full bibliography to 1997 by Huw Walters, Llyfryddiaeth Dr Brynley F. Roberts, J. E. Caerwyn Williams, ed., Ysgrifau Beirniadol, XXII, Denbigh: Gwasg Gee, 1997, pp. 22–40

Academic offices
Preceded by R. Geraint Gruffydd	Librarian of the National Library of Wales; 1988–1998	Succeeded by J. Lionel Madden
