= Jantunen =

Jantunen is a Finnish surname. Notable people with the surname include:

- Arvo Jantunen (1929–2018), Finnish basketball player and coach
- Heli Jantunen (born 1958), Finnish electrical engineer researching electroceramics for telecommunications
- Marko Jantunen (born 1971), Finnish ice hockey player
- Mikael Jantunen (born 2000), Finnish basketball player
- Pertti Jantunen (born 1952), Finnish footballer and manager
