= White dragon =

Symbol of the Anglo-Saxons in Welsh mythology

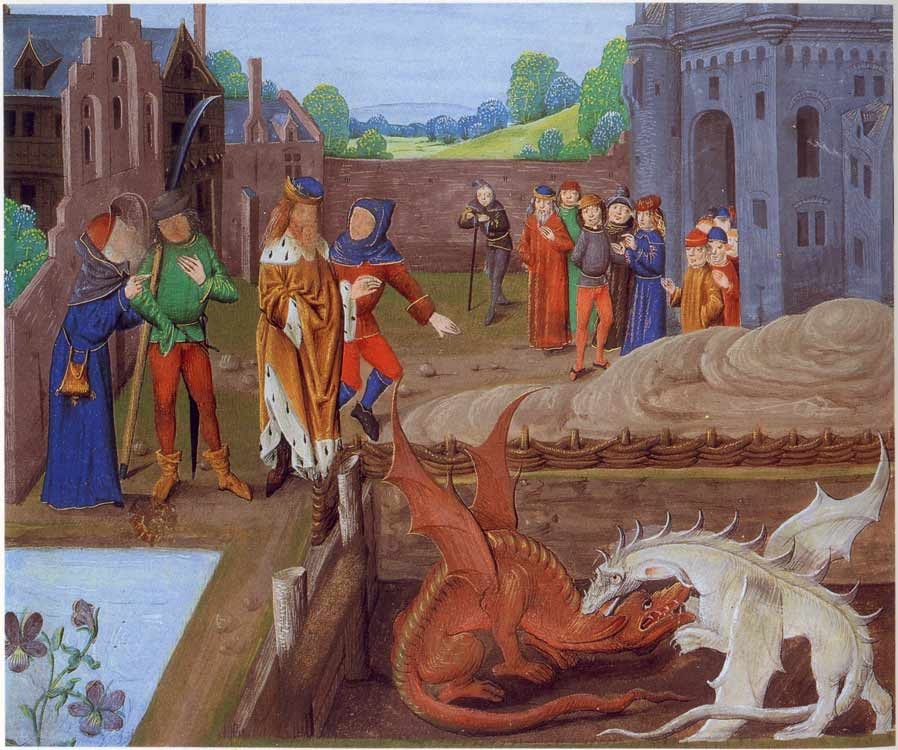
Vortigern and Ambros watch the fight between the red and white dragons: an illustration from a 15th-century manuscript of Geoffrey of Monmouth's History of the Kings of Britain.

The white dragon (Welsh: Y Ddraig Wen) is a symbol associated in Welsh mythology with the Anglo-Saxons.

== Origin of tradition ==
The earliest usage of the white dragon as a symbol of the Anglo-Saxons is found in the Historia Brittonum. The relevant story takes place at Dinas Emrys when Vortigern (the king of the Britons) tries to build a castle there. Every night, unseen forces demolish the castle walls and foundations. Vortigern consults his advisers, who tell him to find a boy with no natural father, and to sacrifice him. Vortigern finds such a boy, but on hearing that he is to be put to death to solve the demolishing of the walls, the boy dismisses the knowledge of the advisors. The boy tells the king of the two dragons. Vortigern excavates the hill, freeing the dragons. They continue their fight and the red dragon finally defeats the white dragon. The boy tells Vortigern that the white dragon symbolises the Saxons and that the red dragon symbolises the Celtic Britons.

The story is repeated in Geoffrey of Monmouth's fictional History of the Kings of Britain (c. 1136). In this telling the boy is identified as the young Merlin. The Historia Brittonum and History of the Kings of Britain are the only medieval texts to use the white dragon as a symbol of the English.

A similar story of white and red dragons fighting is found in the medieval romance Lludd and Llefelys, although in this case the dragons are not used to symbolize Britons or Saxons. The battle between the two dragons is the second plague to strike the Island of Britain, as the White Dragon would strive to overcome the Red Dragon, making the Red cry out a fearful shriek which was heard over every Brythonic hearth. This shriek went through people's hearts, scaring them so much that the men lost their hue and their strength, women lost their children, young men and the maidens lost their senses, and all the animals and trees and the earth and the waters were left barren. Lludd finally eradicated the plague by catching the dragons and burying both of them in a rock pit at Dinas Emrys in Snowdonia, north Wales, the securest place in Britain at that time. He captured the dragons by digging a pit under the exact point where the dragons would fall down exhausted after fighting. This place was at Oxford, which Lludd found to be the exact centre of the island when he measured the island of Britain. The pit had a satin covering over it and a cauldron of mead in it at the bottom. First, the dragons fought by the pit in the form of terrific animals. Then they began to fight in the air over the pit in the form of dragons. Then, exhausted with the fighting, they fell down on the pit in the form of pigs and sank into the pit, drawing the satin covering under them into the cauldron at the bottom of the pit, whereupon they drank the mead and fell asleep. The dragons were then wrapped up in the satin covering and placed in the pit to be buried at Dinas Emrys.

While a dragon was used by Anglo-Saxon kings as a symbol of authority, it is often unclear what colour the dragon was or whether the colour carried any significance. A dragon or wyvern standard is used by the Anglo-Saxons in the Bayeux Tapestry, though it appears to be gold.

== Modern usage ==
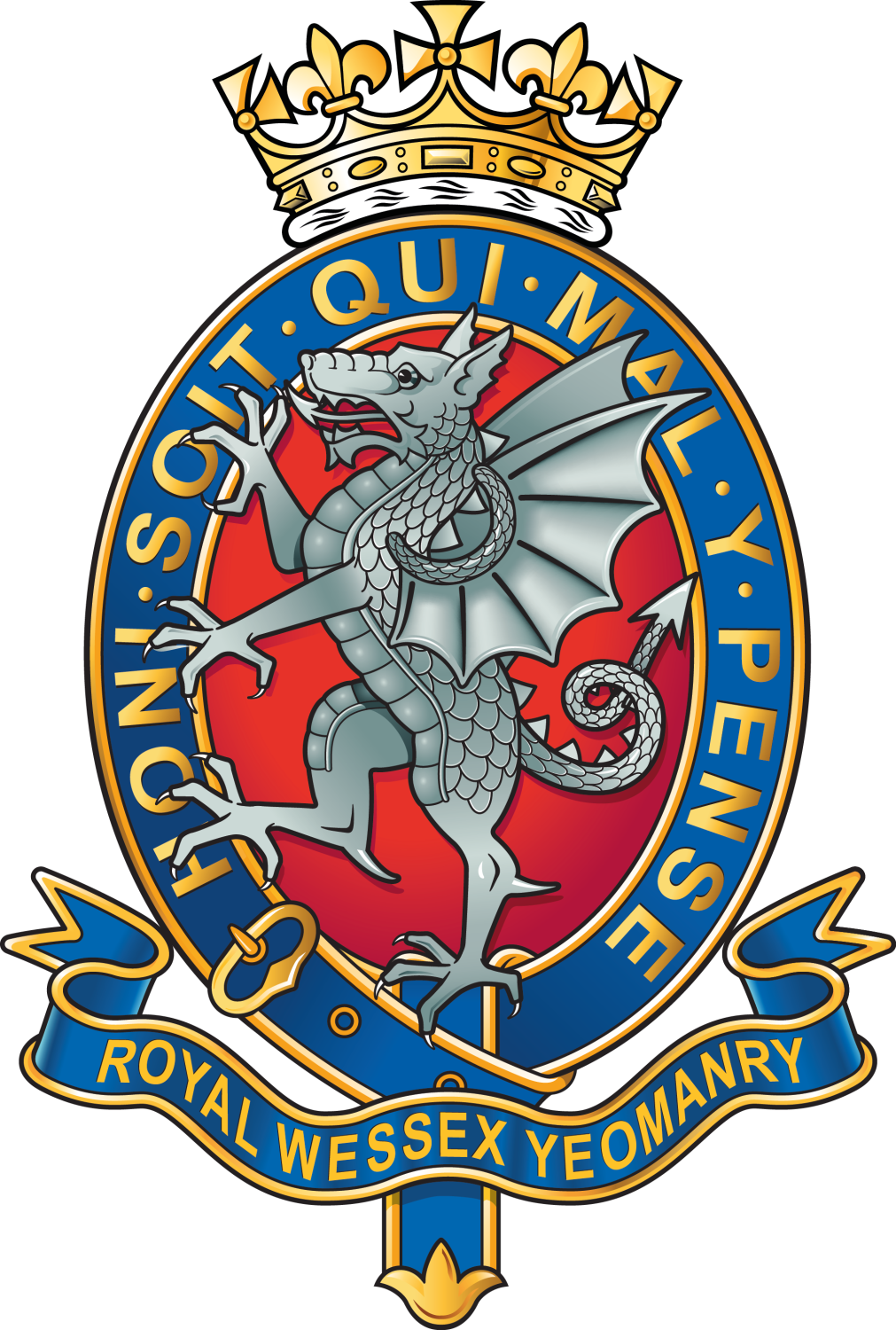
Royal Wessex Yeomanry Cap badge

During the Wars of the Roses the white dragon was used on a manuscript where for the Yorkists the red dragon represented Edward IV, and the white dragon the Lancastrians. This served as propaganda, alluding to the Arthurian prophecy, that after a struggle in which the Welsh (red dragon), defeated by the Saxons (white dragon) at first, would ultimately prevail.

Sir Walter Scott (1771–1832) mentions the white dragon in his poem "The Saxon War Song":

Whet the bright steel,

Sons of the White Dragon! Kindle the torch,

Daughter of Hengist!

In February 2003 during his enthronement at Canterbury Cathedral Archbishop Rowan Williams wore hand-woven gold silk robes bearing a gold and silver clasp that showed the white dragon of England and the red dragon of Wales.

In 2014 the Royal Wessex Yeomanry adopted the white dragon as the centrepiece of their new capbadge. A dragon or wyvern is often used to represent Wessex, and a flag featuring a gold wyvern on a red field is used to represent Wessex.

In the present era, the white dragon symbol is sometimes associated with St Edmund, and those who commemorate him. St Edmund is sometimes regarded as the patron saint of England during the Anglo-Saxon era, until he was displaced by St George, who is famous for having slain a dragon.

A version of the white dragon is sometimes used informally as an English flag.

== Appropriation attempts by the far-right ==
Like other English national symbols, including the Saint George's Cross, the far right have occasionally used the white dragon. A version of the white dragon symbol was embraced by Geoffrey Dunn (also known as Wulf Ingessunu), a far-right activist whose organisation Woden's Folk regards Adolf Hitler to have been "the incarnation of Wotan upon Earth." In the 1980s, Ingessunu adopted the image of a white dragon on a red background as a symbol, and presented the white dragon's mythological opponent of the red dragon as "the Red Dragon of Juda-Rome". The symbol chosen by Ingessunu of a white dragon on a red background briefly became widespread amongst far-right English ethno-nationalists in the early twenty-first century, leading to it being described by historian Ethan Doyle White as "arguably... Ingessunu's foremost contribution to the white nationalist milieu." Far-right English nationalist organisations that adopted Ingessunu's white dragon flag include the Steadfast Trust and the English Shieldwall.

== In other mythologies ==
In Chinese mythology, the White Dragon is identified as Ao Run, one of the four Dragon Kings who rule over the cardinal directions and the seas. Ao Run governs the western seas and is associated with the season of autumn. The Dragon Kings are revered as powerful deities who control water-related phenomena, such as rainfall and floods, and are often invoked in prayers for rain and protection against natural disasters. Each Dragon King is linked to a specific color, direction, and season, with Ao Run’s white hue symbolizing purity and the west’s metal element in the Five Elements (Wu Xing) philosophy.

The veneration of the Dragon Kings, including Ao Run, has been integral to Chinese religious practices, with temples dedicated to their worship found throughout coastal regions. These deities also appear in various Chinese literary works and folklore, underscoring their cultural significance.

== See also ==
- Anglo-Saxons
- Coronation Stone
- England
- English people
- Funens Life regiment
- Hengist and Horsa
- Jutes
- Saxon steed
- The Battle of Burford and the Golden Dragon
- Welsh dragon
- White Horse Stone
- Wyvern
