= Etymology of London =

Derivation of the place-name London

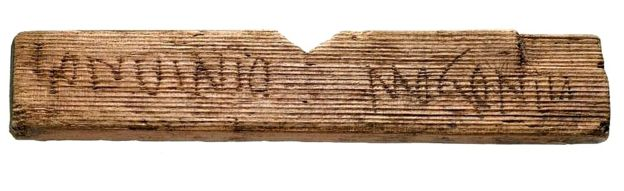
A tablet from c. 65 AD, reading "Londinio Mogontio"- "In London, to Mogontius"

The name of London is derived from a word first attested, in Latinised form, as Londinium. By the first century CE, this was a commercial centre in Roman Britain.

The etymology of the name is uncertain. There is a long history of mythicising etymologies, such as the twelfth-century Historia Regum Britanniae asserting that the city's name is derived from the name of King Lud who once controlled the city. However, in recent times a series of alternative theories have also been proposed. As of 2017, the trend in scholarly publications supports derivation from a Brittonic form *Londonjon.

== Attested forms ==
Richard Coates, in the 1998 article where he published his own theory of the etymology, lists all the known occurrences of the name up to around the year 900, in Greek, Latin, British and Anglo-Saxon. Most of the older sources begin with Londin- (Λονδίνιον, Londino, Londinium etc.), though there are some in Lundin-. Later examples are mostly Lundon- or London-, and all the Anglo-Saxon examples have Lunden- with various terminations. He observes that the modern spelling with <o> derives from a medieval writing habit of avoiding <u> between letters composed of minims.

The earliest written mention of London occurs in a letter discovered in London in 2016. Dated AD 65–80, it reads Londinio Mogontio which translates to "In London, to Mogontius". Mogontio, Mogontiacum is also the Celtic name of the German city Mainz.

== Phonology ==
Coates (1998) asserts that "It is quite clear that these vowel letters in the earliest forms [viz., Londinium, Lundinium], both <o> and <u>, represent phonemically long vowel sounds". He observes that the ending in Latin sources before 600 is always -inium, which points to a British double termination -in-jo-n.

However, it has long been observed that the proposed Common Brittonic name *Londinjon cannot give either the known Anglo-Saxon form Lunden, or the Welsh form Llundein. Following regular sound changes in the two languages, the Welsh name would have been *Lunnen or similar, and Old English would be *Lynden via i-mutation.

Coates (1998) tentatively accepts the argument by Jackson (1938) that the British form was -on-jo-n, with the change to -inium unexplained. Coates speculates further that the first -i- could have arisen by metathesis of the -i- in the last syllable of his own suggested etymon (see below).

Peter Schrijver (2013) by way of explaining the medieval forms Lunden and Llundein considers two possibilities:

- In the local dialect of Lowland British Celtic, which later became extinct, -ond- became -und- regularly, and -ī- became -ei-, leading to Lundeinjon, later Lundein. The Welsh and English forms were then borrowed from this. This hypothesis requires that the Latin form have a long ī: Londīnium.
- The early British Latin dialect probably developed similarly as the dialect of Gaul (the ancestor of Old French). In particular, Latin stressed short i developed first into close-mid /e/, then diphthongised to /ei/. The combination -ond- also developed regularly into -und- in pre-Old French. Thus, he concludes, the remaining Romans of Britain would have pronounced the name as Lundeiniu, later Lundein, from which the Welsh and English forms were then borrowed. This hypothesis requires that the Latin form have a short i: Londinium.

Schrijver therefore concludes that the name of Londinium underwent phonological changes in a local dialect (either British Celtic or British Latin) and that the recorded medieval forms in Welsh and Anglo-Saxon would have been derived from that dialectal pronunciation.

== Other languages ==
- In French, Spanish and Portuguese the city is known as Londres
- In Italian the city is known as Londra
- In Czech and Slovak the city is known as Londýn (long "y", the Czech and Slovak languages use long and short vowels as opposed to Polish with short vowels only)
- In Polish the city is known as Londyn
- In Welsh, the city is known as Llundain
- In Scots the city is known as Lunnon

== Proposed etymologies ==
=== Celtic ===
Coates says (p. 211) that "The earliest non-mythic speculation ... centred on the possibility of deriving London from Welsh Llyn din, supposedly 'lake fort'. But llyn derives from British *lind-, which is incompatible with all the early attestations. Another suggestion, published in The Geographical Journal in 1899, is that the area of London was previously settled by Belgae who named their outposts after townships in Gallia Belgica. Some of these Belgic toponyms have been attributed to the namesake of London including Limé, Douvrend, and Londinières.

H. D'Arbois de Jubainville suggested in 1899 that the name meant Londino's fortress. But Coates argues that there is no such personal name recorded, and that D'Arbois' suggested etymology for it (from Celtic *londo-, 'fierce') would have a short vowel. Coates notes that this theory was repeated by linguists up to the 1960s, and more recently still in less specialist works. It was revived in 2013 by Peter Schrijver, who suggested that the sense of the proto-Indo-European root *lend^{h}- ('sink, cause to sink'), which gave rise to the Celtic noun *londos ('a subduing'), survived in Celtic. Combined with the Celtic suffix *-injo- (used to form singular nouns from collective ones), this could explain a Celtic form *londinjon 'place that floods (periodically, tidally)'. This, in Schrijver's reading, would more readily explain all the Latin, Welsh, and English forms. Similar approaches to Schrijver's have been taken by Theodora Bynon, who in 2016 supported a similar Celtic etymology, while demonstrating that the place-name was borrowed into the West Germanic ancestor-language of Old English, not into Old English itself.

Coates (1998) proposes a Common Brittonic form of either *Lōondonjon or *Lōnidonjon, which would have become *Lūndonjon and hence Lūndein or Lūndyn. An advantage of the form *Lōnidonjon is that it could account for Latin Londinium by metathesis to *Lōnodinjon. The etymology of this *Lōondonjon would however lie in pre-Celtic Old European hydronymy, from a hydronym *Plowonida, which would have been applied to the Thames where it becomes too wide to ford, in the vicinity of London. The settlement on its banks would then be named from the hydronym with the suffix -on-jon, giving *Plowonidonjon and Insular Celtic *Lowonidonjon. According to this approach, the name of the river itself would be derived from the Indo-European roots *plew- "to flow, swim; boat" and *nejd- "to flow", found in various river names around Europe. Coates does admit that compound names are comparatively rare for rivers in the Indo-European area, but they are not entirely unknown. Lacey Wallace describes the derivation as "somewhat tenuous".

=== Non-Celtic ===
Among the first scientific explanations was one by Giovanni Alessio in 1951. He proposed a Ligurian rather than a Celtic origin, with a root *lond-/lont- meaning 'mud' or 'marsh'. Coates' major criticisms are that this does not have the required long vowel (an alternative form Alessio proposes, *lōna, has the long vowel, but lacks the required consonant), and that there is no evidence of Ligurian in Britain.

Jean-Gabriel Gigot in a 1974 article discusses the toponym of Saint-Martin-de-Londres, a commune in the French Hérault département. Gigot derives this Londres from a Germanic root *lohna, and argues that the British toponym may also be from that source. But a Germanic etymology is rejected by most specialists.

== Historical and popular suggestions ==
The earliest account of the toponym's derivation can be attributed to Geoffrey of Monmouth. In Historia Regum Britanniae, the name is described as originating from King Lud, who seized the city Trinovantum and ordered it to be renamed in his honour as Kaerlud. This eventually developed into Karelundein and then London. However, Geoffrey's work contains many fanciful suppositions about place-name derivation and the suggestion has no basis in linguistics.

Other fanciful theories over the years have been:

- William Camden reportedly suggested that the name might come from Brythonic lhwn (modern Welsh Llwyn), meaning "grove", and "town". Thus, giving the origin as Lhwn Town, translating to "city in the grove".
- John Jackson, writing in the Gentleman's Magazine in 1792, challenges the Llyn din theory (see below) on geographical grounds, and suggests instead a derivation from Glynn din – presumably intended as 'valley city'.
- Some British Israelites claimed that the Anglo-Saxons, assumed to be descendants of the Tribe of Dan, named their settlement lan-dan, meaning "abode of Dan" in Hebrew.
- An unsigned article in The Cambro Briton for 1821 supports the suggestion of Luna din ('moon fortress'), and also mentions in passing the possibility of Llong din ('ship fortress').
- Several theories were discussed in the pages of Notes and Queries on 27 December 1851, including Luandun (supposedly "city of the moon", a reference to the temple of Diana supposed to have stood on the site of St Paul's Cathedral), and Lan Dian or Llan Dian ("temple of Diana"). Another correspondent dismissed these, and reiterated the common Llyn din theory.
- In The Cymry of '76 (1855), Alexander Jones says that the Welsh name derives from Llyn Dain, meaning 'pool of the Thames'.
- An 1887 Handbook for Travellers asserts that "The etymology of London is the same as that of Lincoln" (Latin Lindum).
- Edward P. Cheney, in his 1904 book A Short History of England (p. 18), attributes the origin of the name to dun: "Elevated and easily defensible spots were chosen [in pre-Roman times], earthworks thrown up, always in a circular form, and palisades placed upon these. Such a fortification was called a dun, and London and the names of many other places still preserve that termination in varying forms."
- A New Variorum Edition of Shakespeare (1918) mentions a variant on Geoffrey's suggestion being Lud's town, although refutes it saying that the origin of the name was most likely Saxon.
