= History of the Kings (Peniarth 23C) =

Welsh manuscript

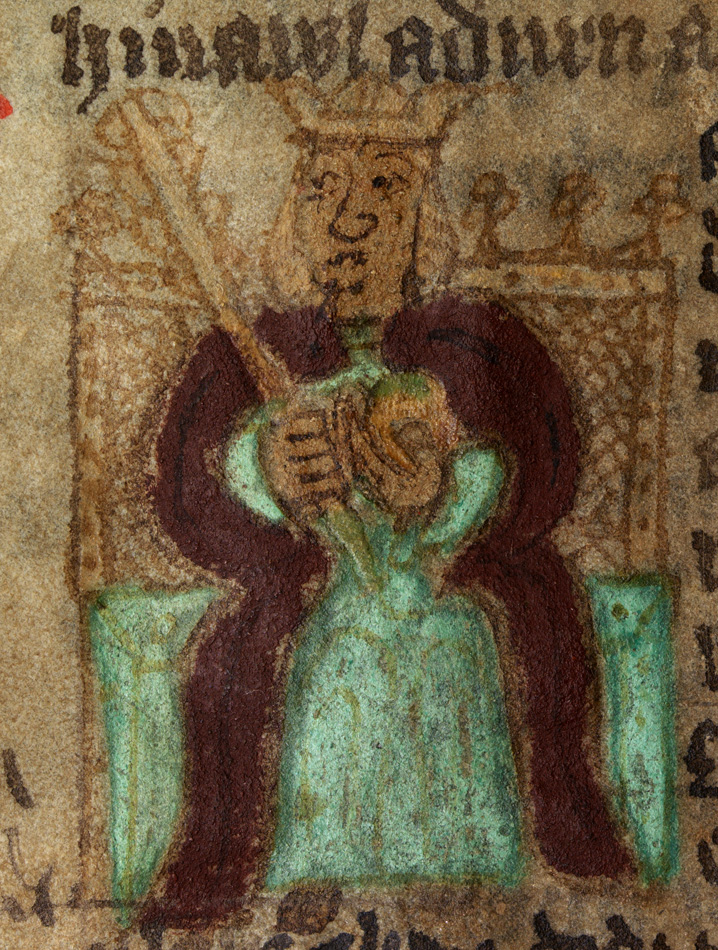
History of the Kings (f.52v.), Constans.

The History of the Kings, or Brut y Brenhinedd, is a Welsh translation of Geoffrey of Monmouth’s Historia Regum Britanniae (History of the Kings of Britain). The manuscript, which was copied in the late fifteenth century, is probably the only illustrated Welsh-language medieval narrative. It is part of the Peniarth Manuscripts collection at the National Library of Wales (Peniarth Ms. 23C).

The text of Peniarth 23C is written on parchment and decorated with fifty-nine illustrations, of which fifty-seven are of kings, and some illuminated initial letters, including zoomorphic forms. It is probable that it was produced in North Wales.

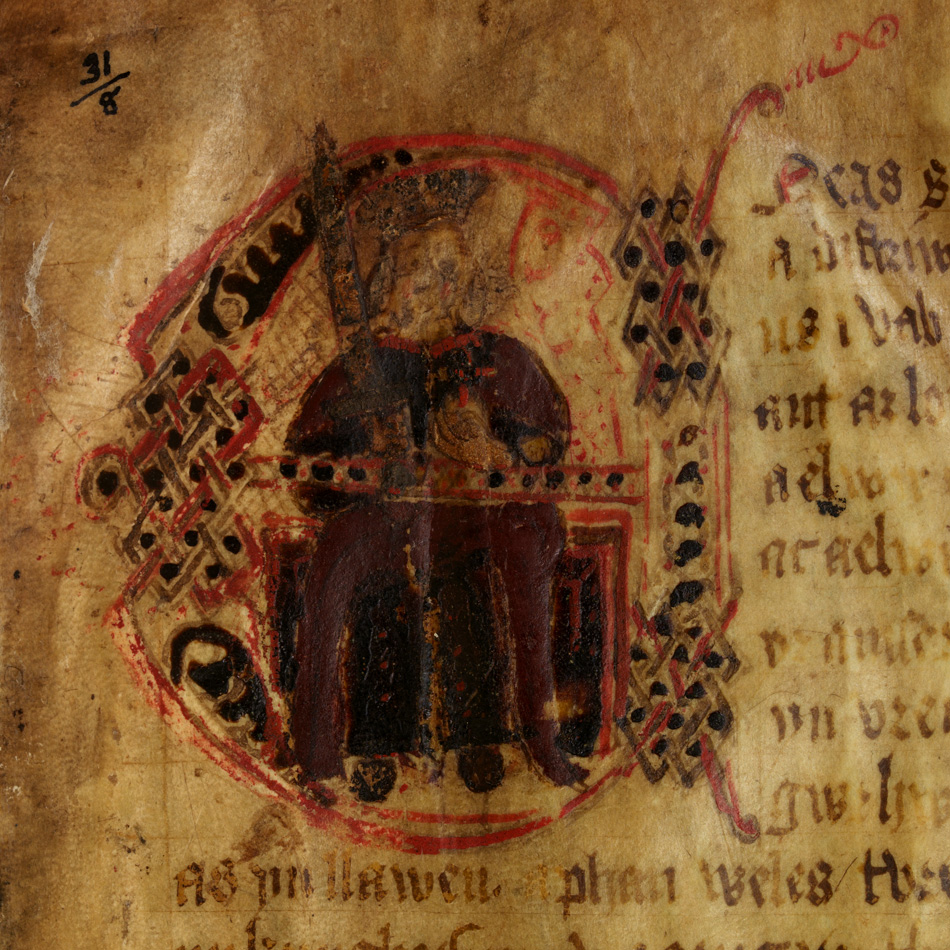
Folio 1. Aeneas.

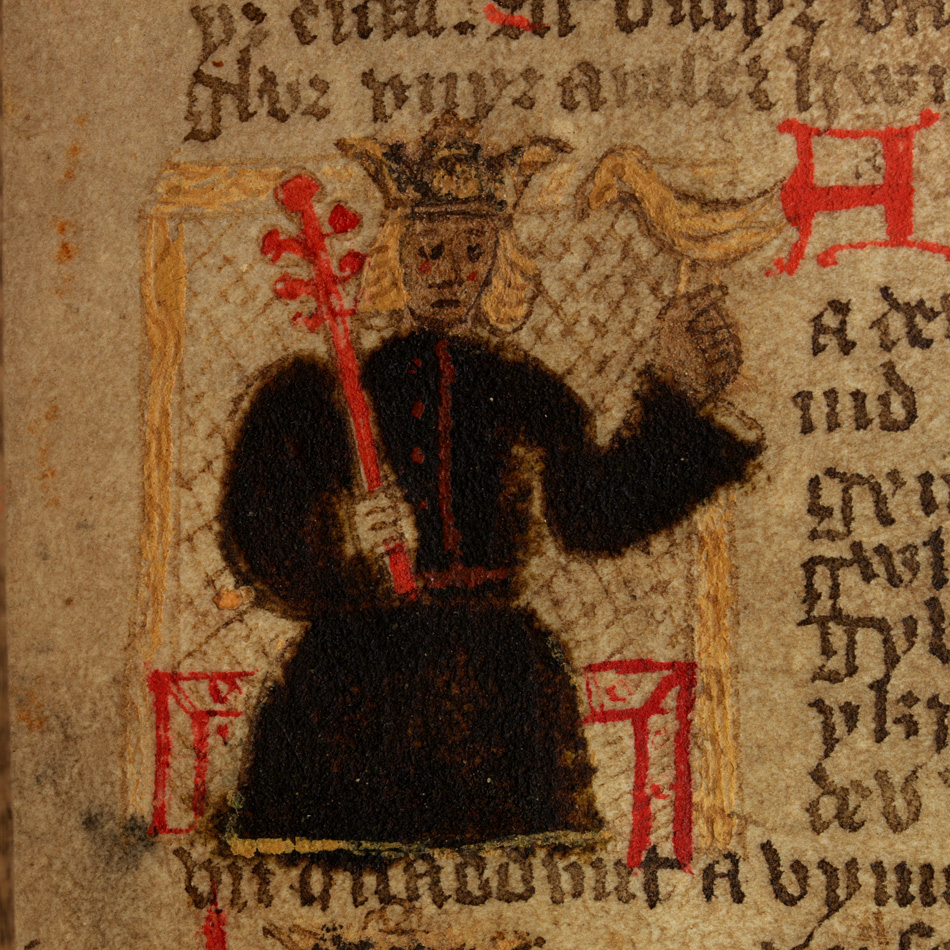
Folio 13r. Madog.

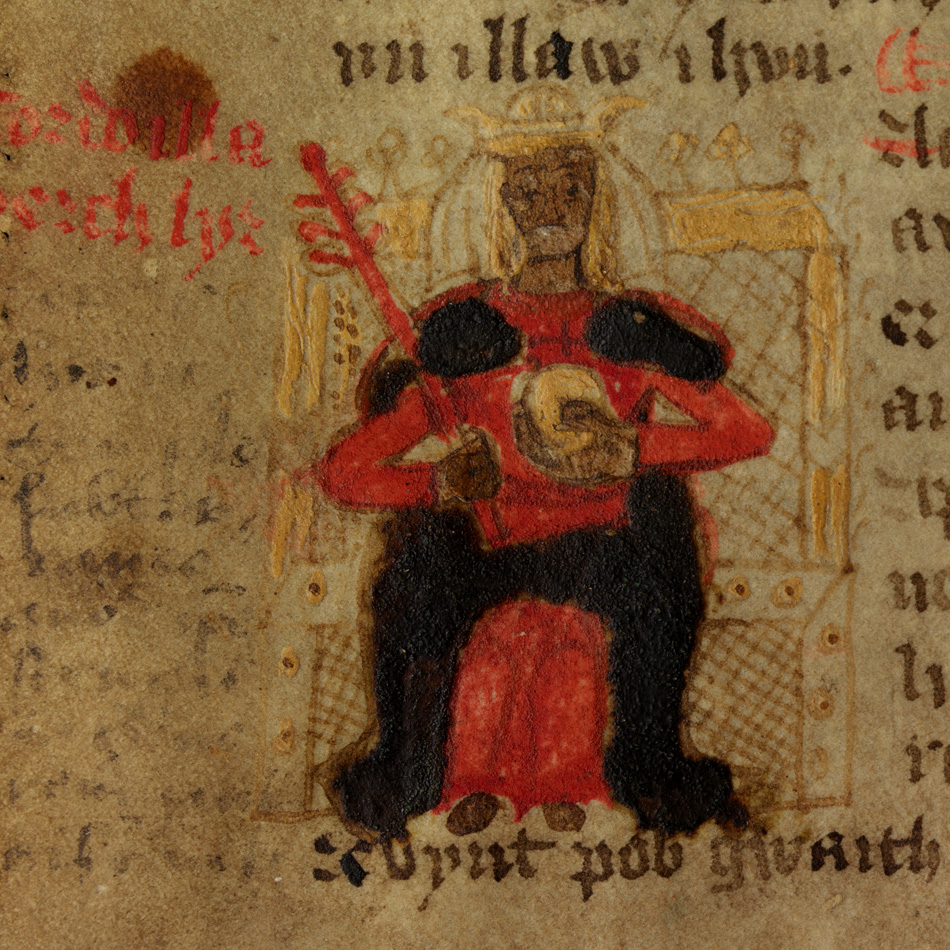
Folio 17v. Cordeilla ferch Lŷr.

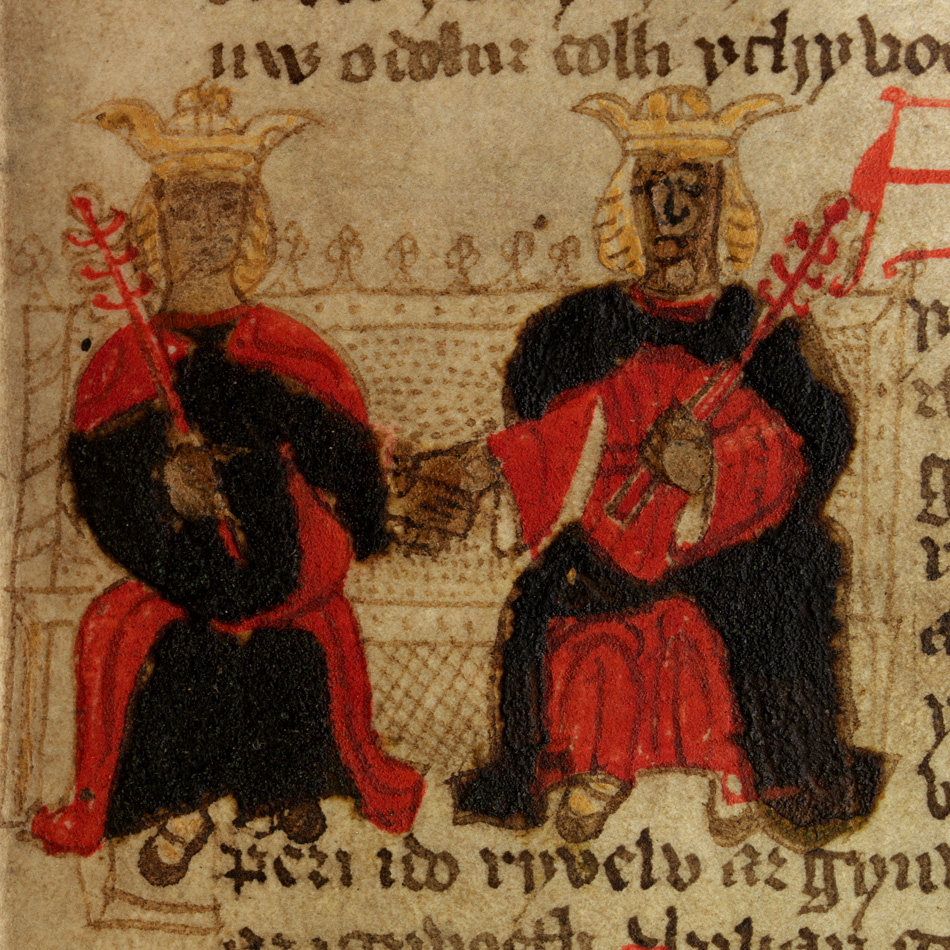
Folio 18r. Morgan and Cunedda.

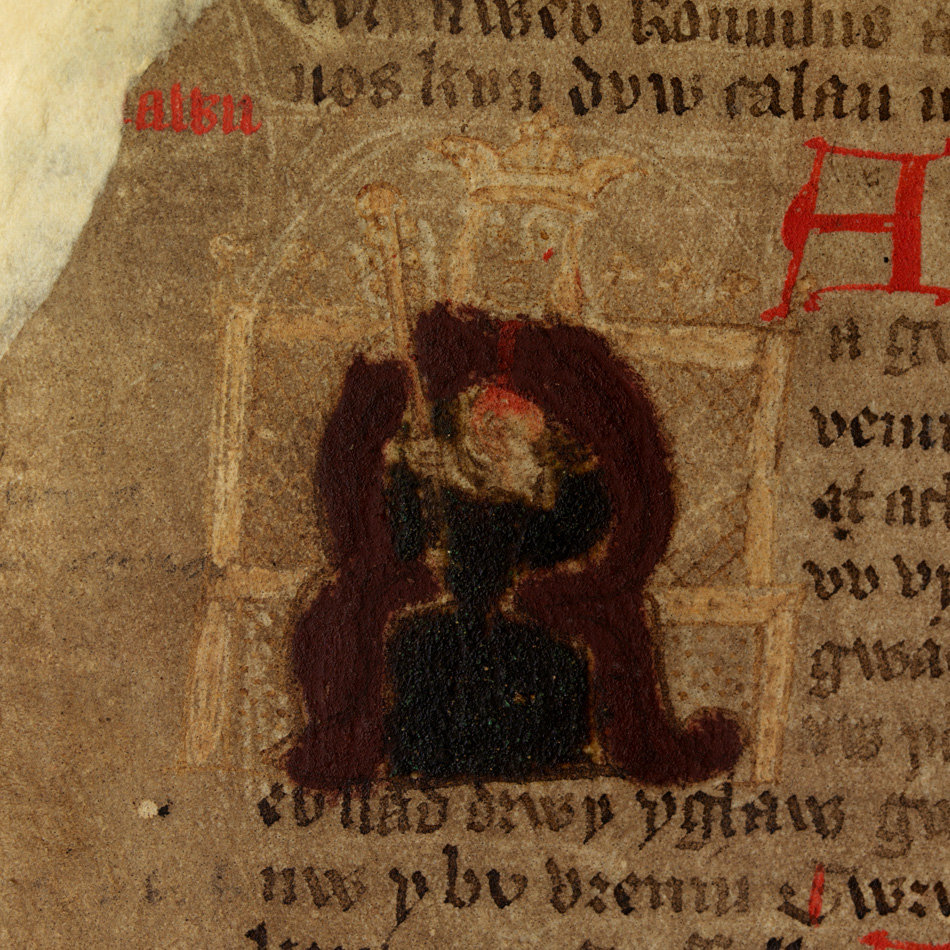
Folio 18v. Rhiwallon.

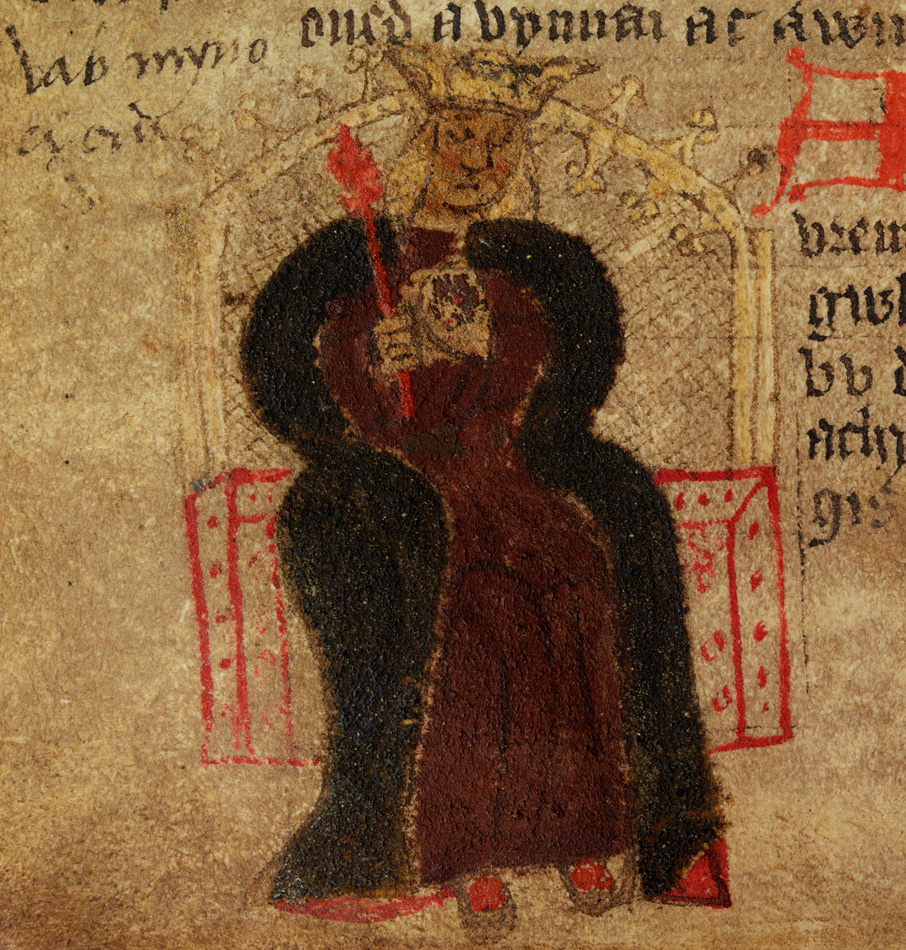
Folio 27v. Beli Mawr fab Mynogan.

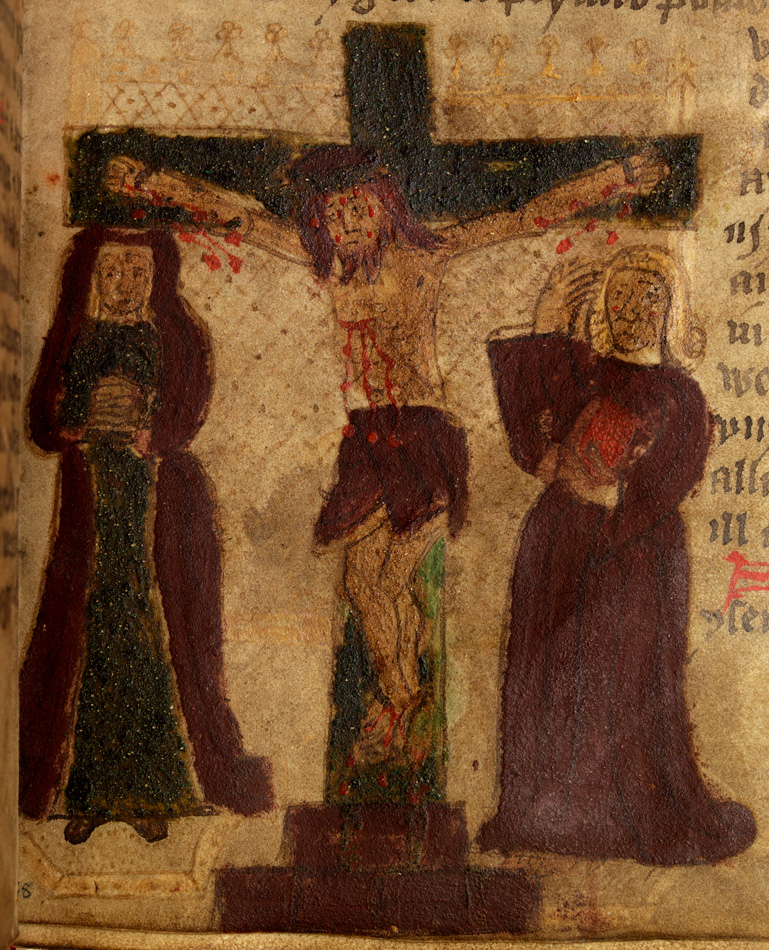
Folio 38r. The Crucifixion of Christ.

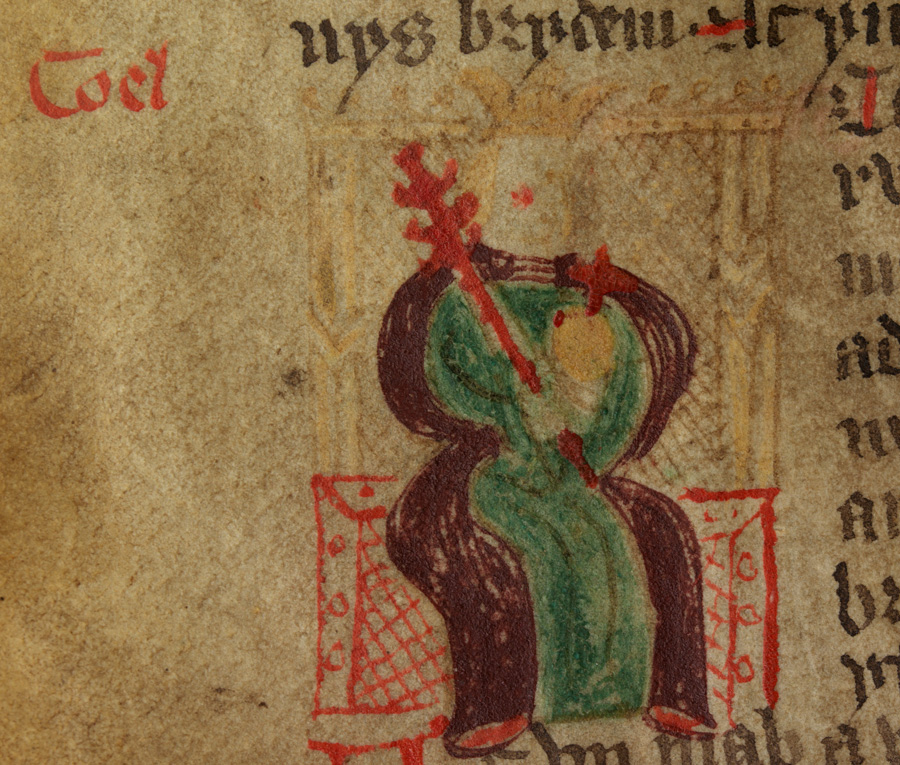
Folio 39v. Coel.

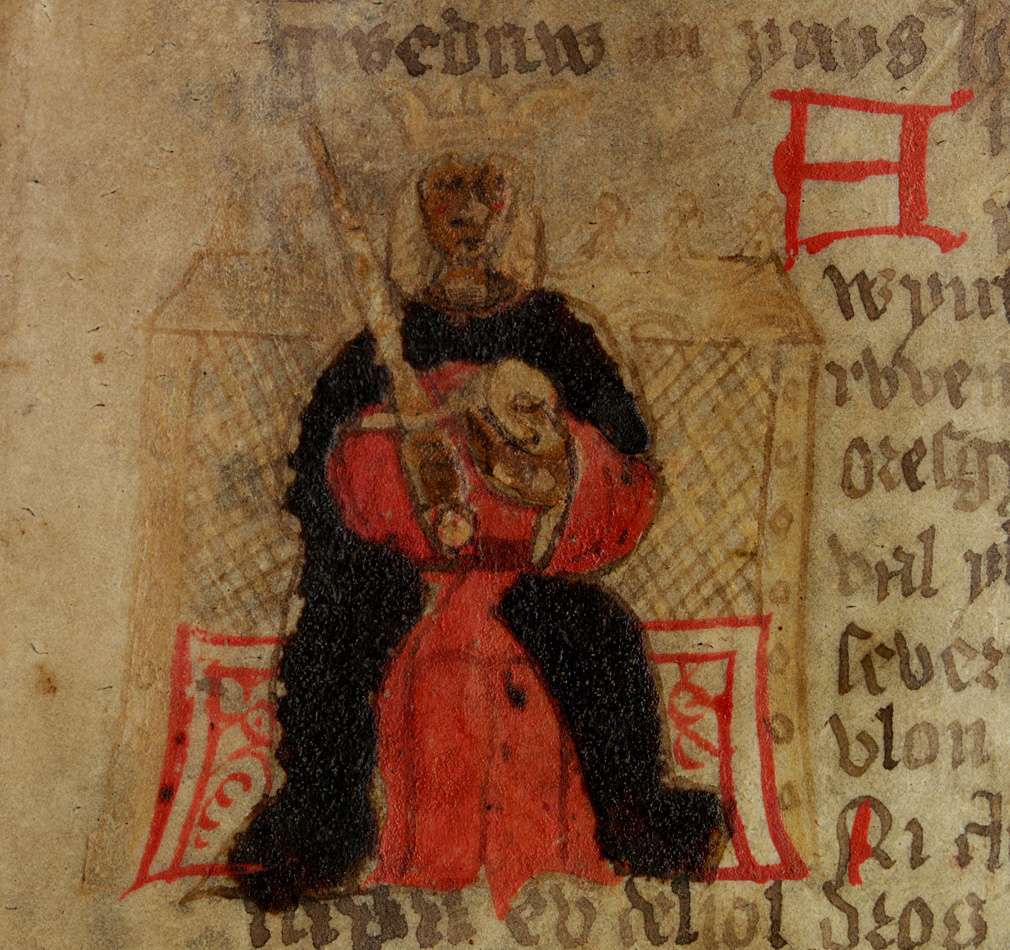
Folio 41r. Severus.

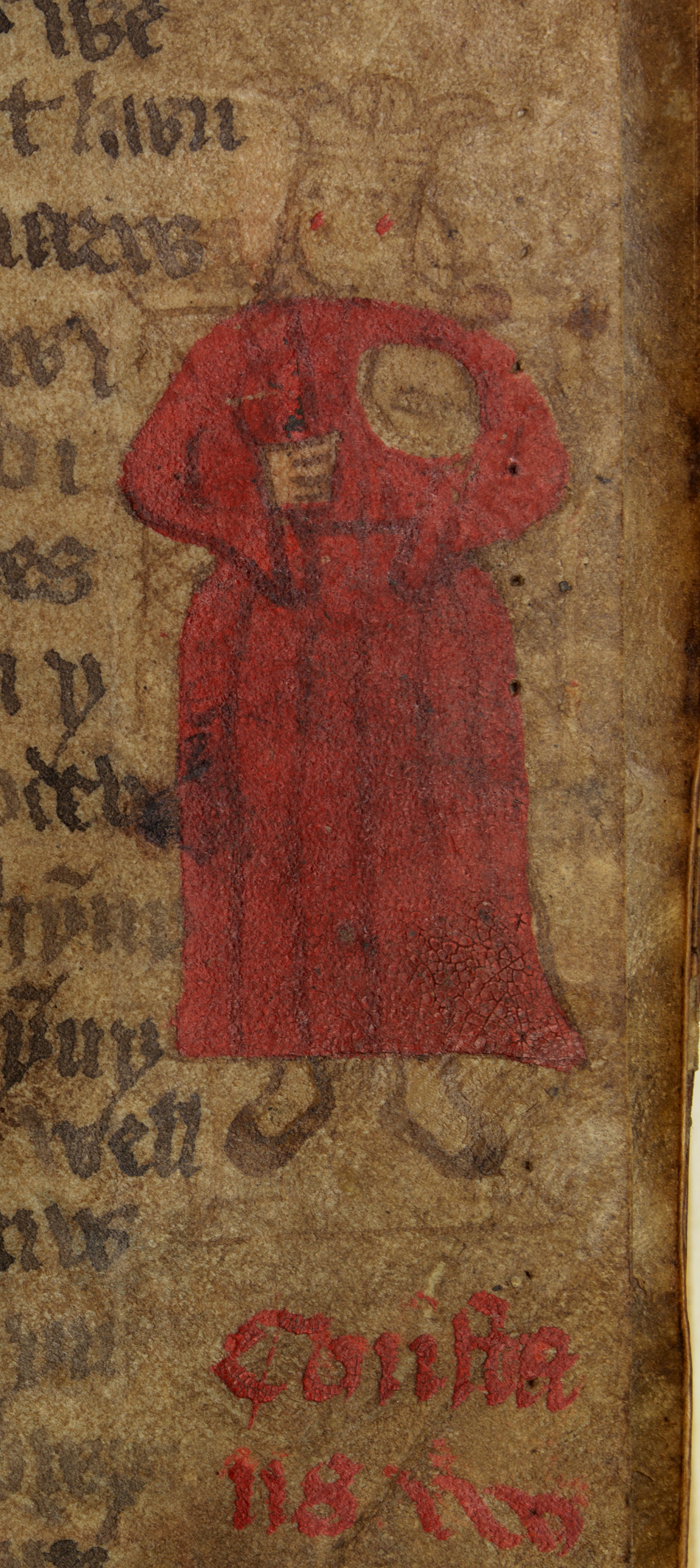
Folio 44r. Constantius.

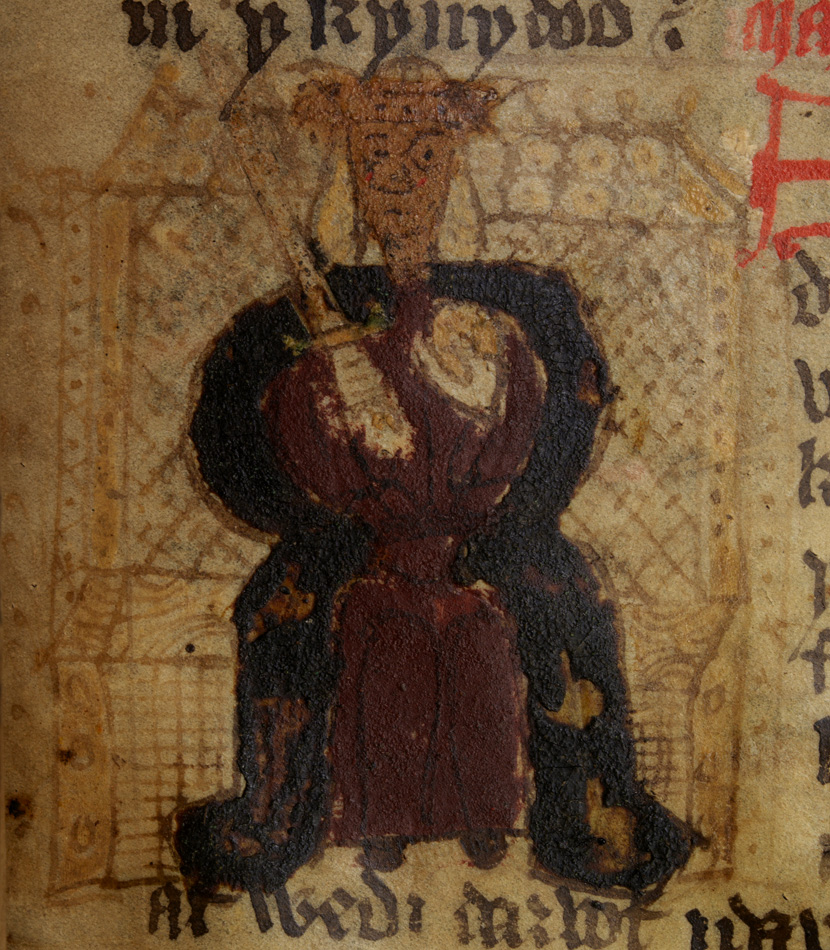
Folio 46r. Macsen Wledig.

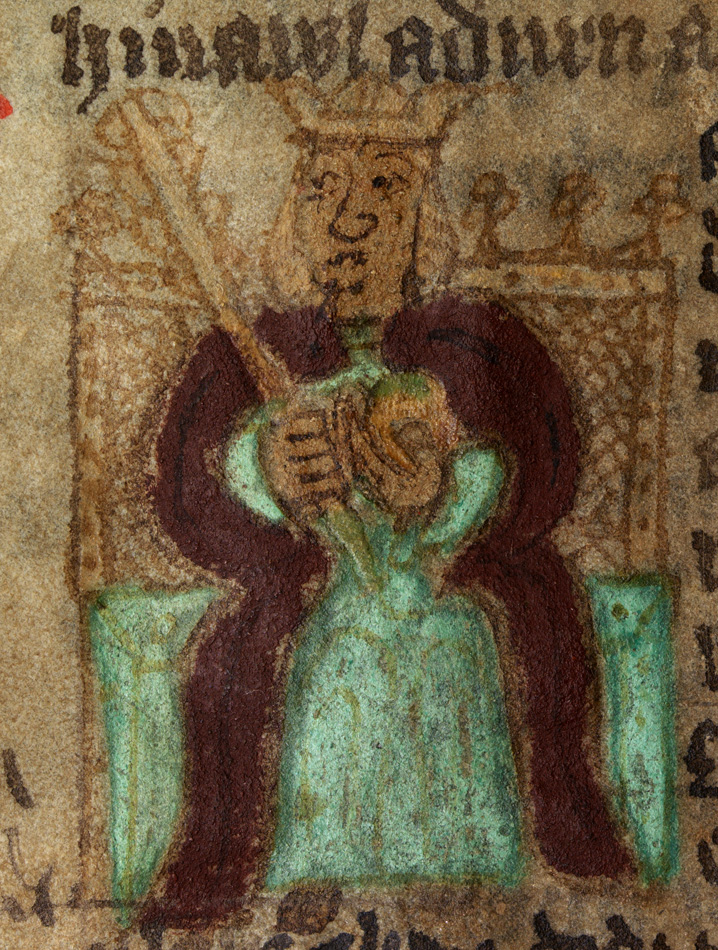
Folio 52v. Constans.

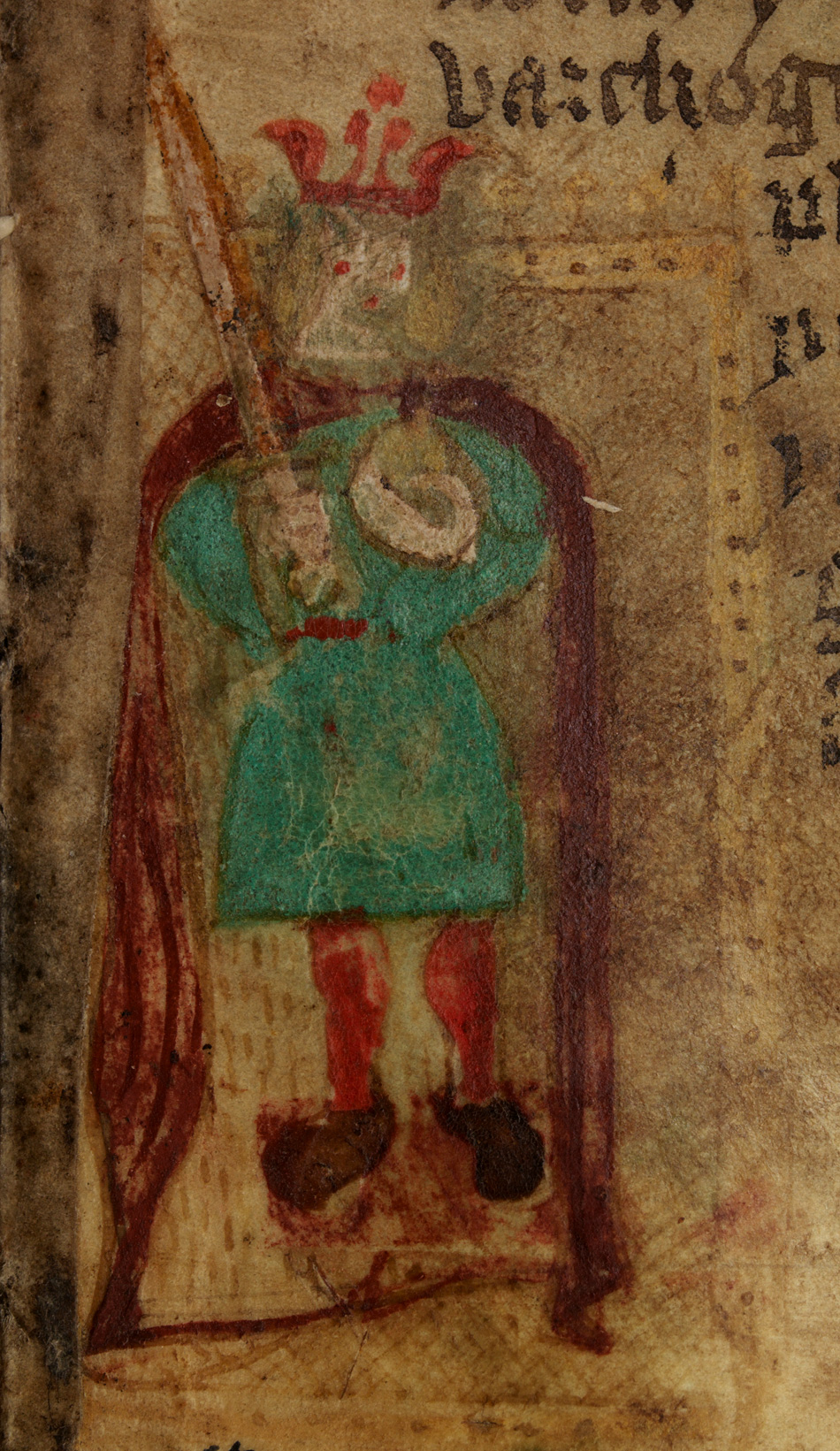
Folio 66r. Emrys Wledig.

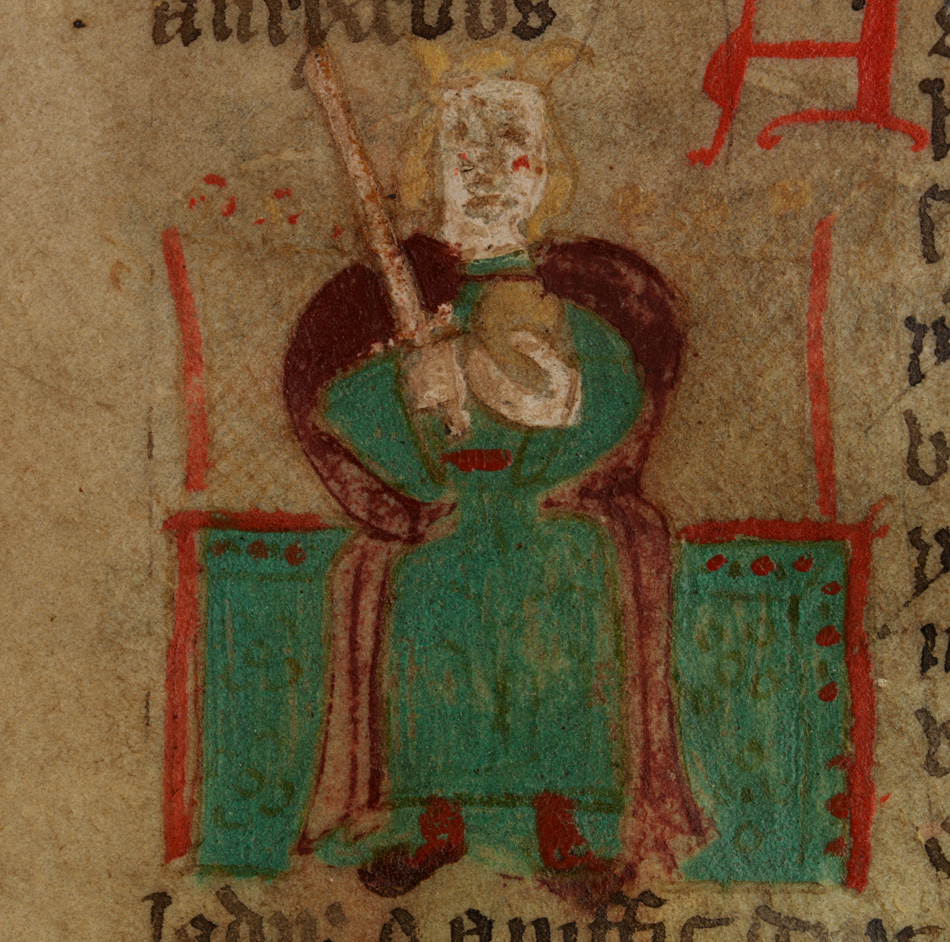
Folio 72r. Uthr Bendragon.

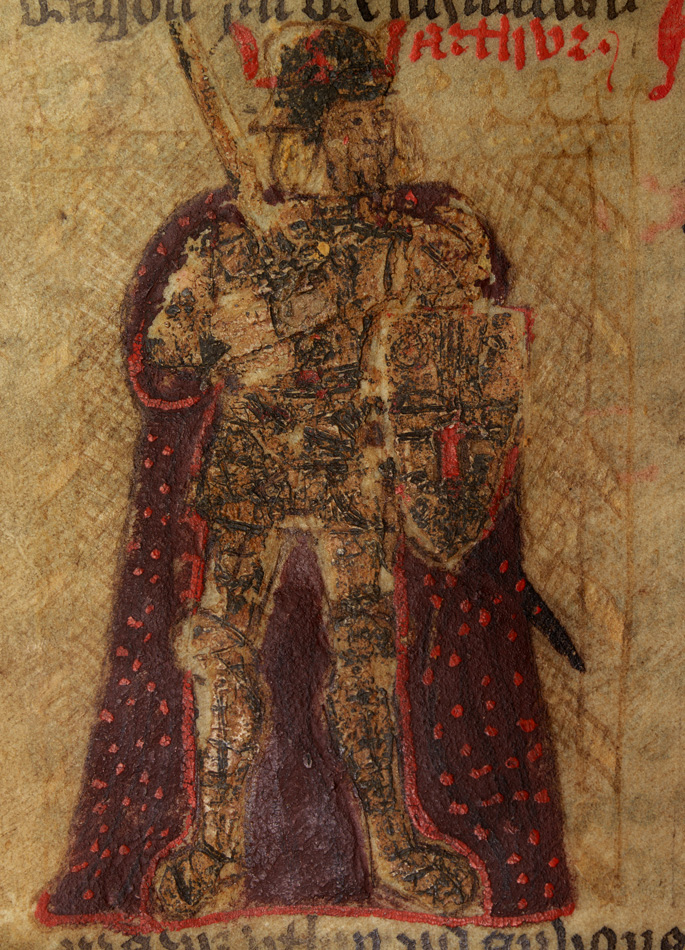
Folio 75v. King Arthur.

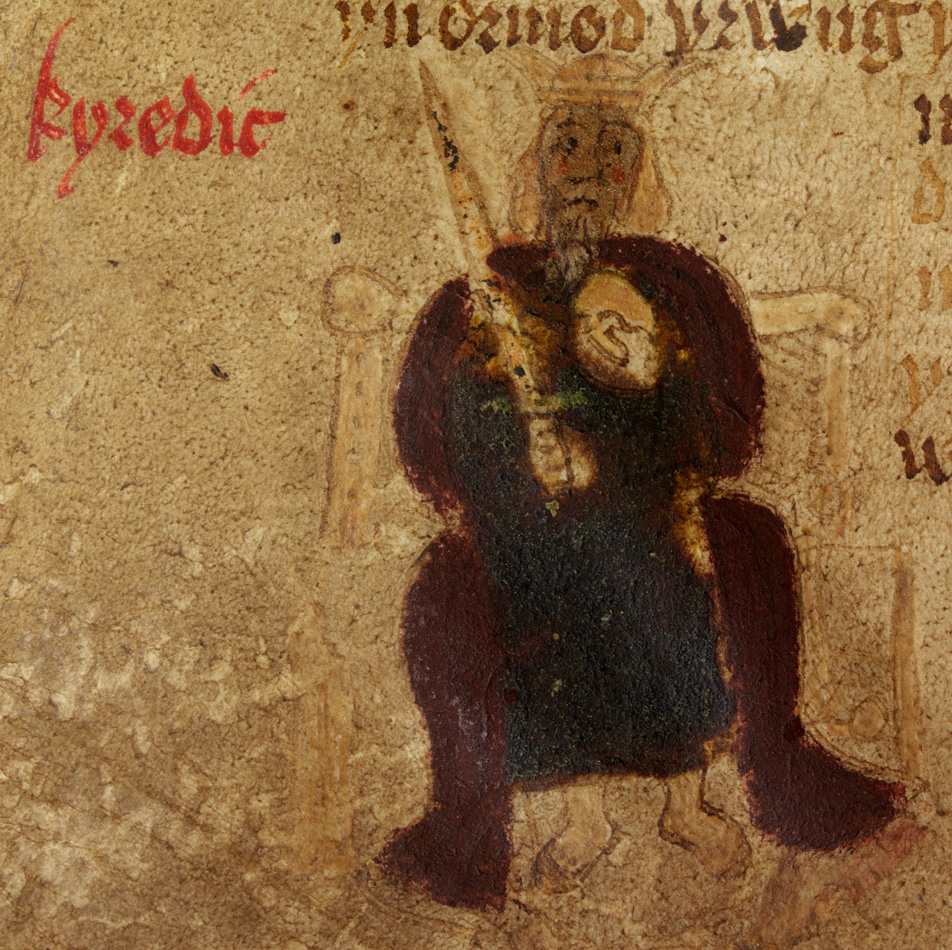
Folio 96v. Ceredig.

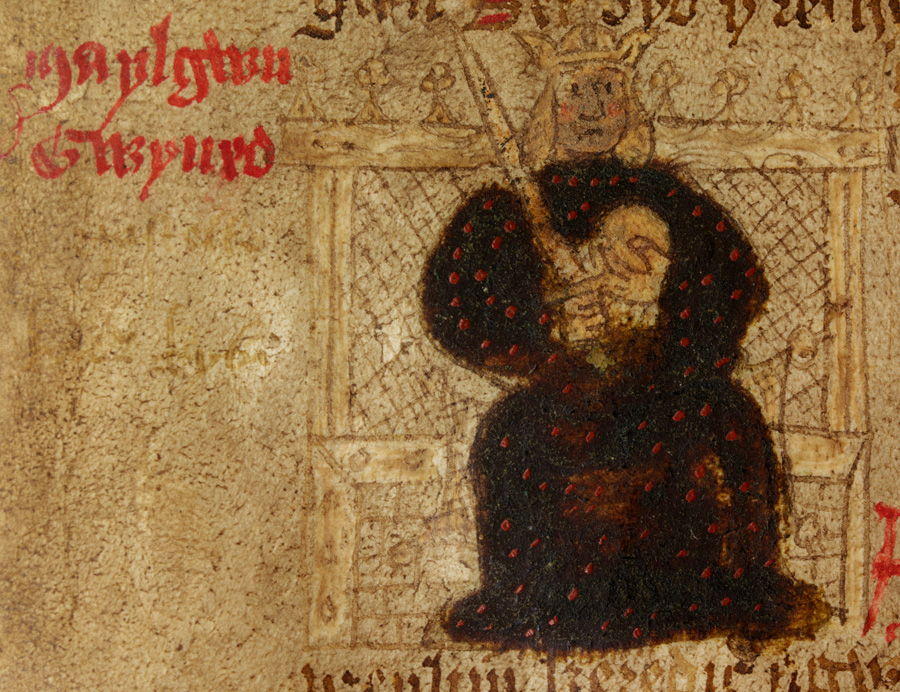
Folio 96v. Maelgwn Gwynedd.

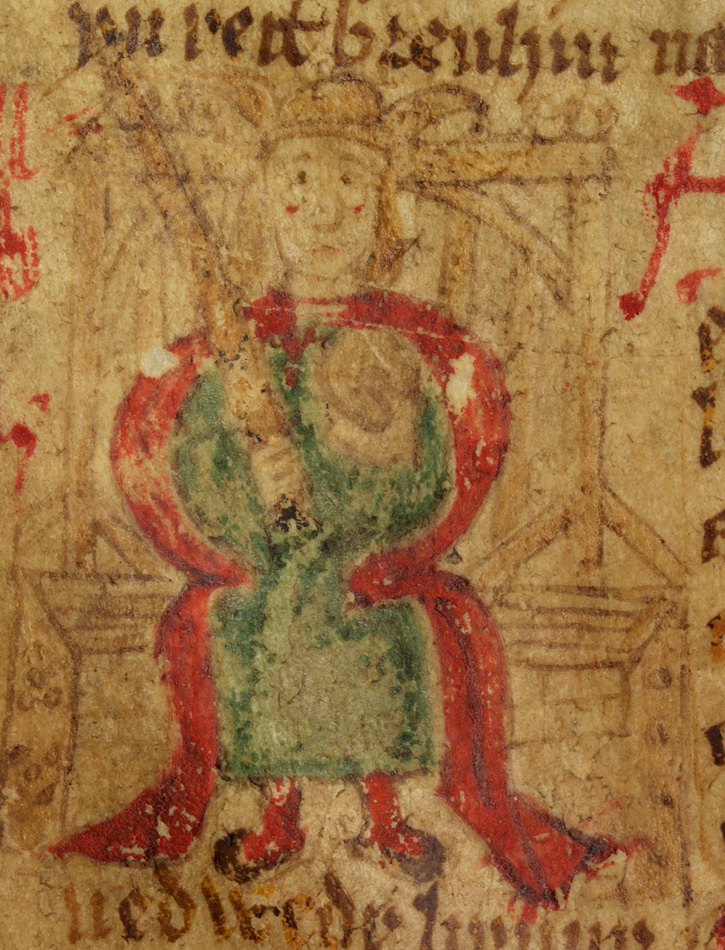
Folio 99v. Cadwallon fab Cadfan.

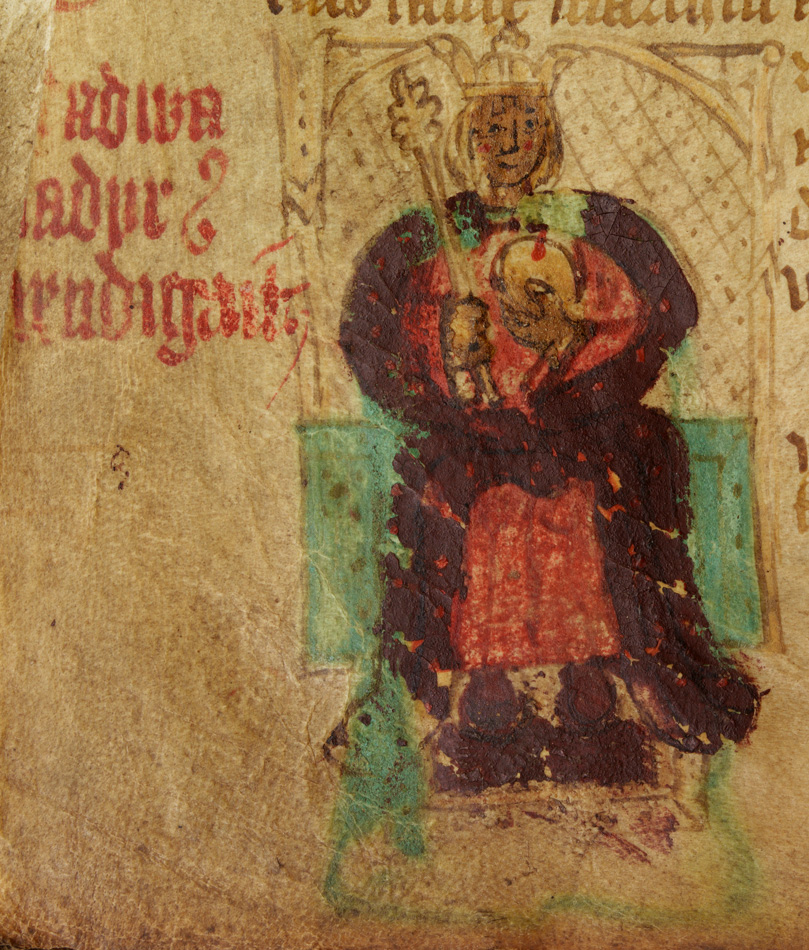
Folio 104v. Cadwaladr Fendigaid.
