= Lludd Llaw Eraint =

Legendary hero from Welsh mythology

Lludd Llaw Ereint ("Lludd of the Silver Hand") son of Beli Mawr, is a legendary hero from Welsh mythology. As Nudd Llaw Ereint (the earlier form of his name, cognate of the Irish Nuada Airgetlám, derived from the pre-Roman Celtic god Nodens) he is the father of Gwyn ap Nudd. He is probably the source of king Lud from Geoffrey of Monmouth's History of the Kings of Britain.

In the Mabinogion tale of Lludd and Llefelys, which influenced Geoffrey of Monmouth's work, he is the ruler of Britain while his brother Llefelys ruled Gaul. Lludd calls on Llefelys to rid Britain of three plagues then afflicting the kingdom. Philological connection suggests that there was once a memorial to Lludd at the site of St Paul's Cathedral, London, near Ludgate, which is named after him.

== The plagues of Lludd’s reign ==
- The first plague was that of the Coranians a race of dwarfs 'from Asia' who may represent the Romans.
- The second was that of the white and red dragons. One of the dragons represented the Brythons, while the other represented the Anglo-Saxon invaders of Britain. On the eve of May Day, the two dragons would begin to fight. The White Dragon would strive to overcome the Red Dragon, making the Red cry out a fearful shriek which was heard over every Brythonic hearth. This shriek went through people's hearts, scaring them so much that the men lost their hue and their strength, women lost their children, young men and the maidens lost their senses, and all the animals and trees and the earth and the waters, were left barren. The plague was finally eradicated by catching the dragons and burying both of them in a rock pit at Dinas Emrys in Snowdonia, north Wales, the securest place in Britain at that time. The dragons were caught by digging out a pit under the exact point where the dragons would fall down exhausted after fighting. This place was at Oxford, which Lludd found to be the exact centre of the island when he measured the island of Britain. The pit had a satin covering over it and a cauldron of mead in it at the bottom. First, the dragons fought by the pit in the form of terrific animals. Then they began to fight in the air over the pit in the form of dragons. Then exhausted with the fighting, they fell down on the pit in the form of pigs and sank into the pit drawing the satin covering under them into the cauldron at the bottom of the pit whereupon they drank the mead and fell asleep. The dragons were then wrapped up in the satin covering and placed in the pit to be buried at Dinas Emrys.
- The third plague was the plunder committed by a giant who wore strong, heavy armour and carried a hamper. His nocturnal entrance was heralded by soporific illusions and musical sounds which lulled the members of Lludd's Court to sleep. Once the court was asleep, he would put all the food and provisions of meat and drink of Lludd's Court into his commodious hamper and take it away with him. This recurring theft constituted the third plague of Lludd's reign. Lludd was only able to stop the recurring theft by confronting the intruder. He was able to avoid falling asleep to the soporific illusions and musical sounds by frequently dipping his head in a vessel of cold water by his side. Upon confronting the magician, a fierce encounter ensued in which glittering fire flew out from their arms until Lludd overcame the magician. Thereupon, Lludd granted him mercy and made him his loyal vassal.

== Etymology ==
The name Nudd, cognate with the Irish Nuada and related to the Romano-British Nodens or Nodons worshiped at Lydney Park in Gloucestershire, probably derives from a Celtic stem *noudont- or *noudent-, which J. R. R. Tolkien suggested was related to a Germanic root meaning "acquire, have the use of", earlier "to catch, entrap (as a hunter)", and together with the "silver hand" epithet detects "an echo of the ancient fame of the magic hand of Nodens the Catcher". Similarly, Julius Pokorny derives the name from a Proto-Indo-European root *neu-d- meaning "acquire, utilise, go fishing".

The name Nudd Llaw Ereint probably assimilated and shifted to Llud Llaw Ereint through alliteration, as suggested by John Rhys and later by Joseph Vendryes.

The byname "Llaw Ereint" or "llawereint" is glossed as "of the Silver Hand" or "Silver-handed". Welsh eraint is listed as meaning "a round body; a ball; a bowl, a cup; a pear", probably related to the adjective erain "abounding with impulse", but ereint has been defined as "silver cup", no doubt owing to Welsh arian "silver".

== See also ==
- Nuada Airgetlam
- Nodens
- Stone Lud
