= Heli Laaksonen =

Finnish poet (born 1972)

Heli Pauliina Laaksonen (born 28 September 1972, in Turku) is a Finnish poet.

She writes poetry in the dialect of south-western Finland, and performs her poetry on tours. She was said in 2011 to be "Finland's best-selling poet" and "at the moment the only Finnish poet who can survive on the proceeds of her poetry without financial assistance". It is said that the majority of her readers and listeners are "women who have reached retirement age".

== Personal life and education ==
Laaksonen spent her childhood in Uusikaupunki. Her mother's family originated from Halikko outside Salo, while her father's family was from Lokalahti outside Uusikaupunki.

She studied at the University of Turku, majoring in Finnish language and graduated with a Master of Arts in 2000. She also studied at the Estonian University of Tartu in 1992 and 1999.

Laaksonen has lived in Helsinki and in 2011, she moved to Lappi.

== Career ==
From 1996 to 2000 Laaksonen worked in Helsinki as an Estonian social communication school language teacher while also teaching at Helsinki Polytechnic Stadia from 1997 to 2001. From 2001 to 2004 she led a Laitila cultural project and in 2004 she founded her own communications company, Sanatoimisto Hulimaa.

Inspired by Estonian poets, Laaksonen became interested in using dialect in poems. After getting to know Jan Rahman, she translated poems written by Rahman in 1997 in the Võru dialect into the dialect of southwestern Finland. The experiment encouraged her to continue with dialect poems. Laaksonen also uses her home dialect typical of southwest Finland. Her work and performance often make use of humour as well as features of different dialects for commentary on Finnishness.

She also performs with Elina Wallin, a dialect writer from Pori.

== Awards ==
In 2007 Laaksonen was elected Alumna of the Year at the University of Turku. In 2009 she received the Larin Paraske Award from the Kalevala Women's Association.

== Selected publications ==
She contributed a translation to the book Intiimejä avaruuksia : XXV skotlantilaista runoa 1978-2002 (Intimate Expanses: XXV Scottish Poems 1978-2002), a collection of Scottish poems translated into Finnish, published in 2006 by Finnish publisher Like (ISBN 9524718677), the original having been published in 2004 by Carcanet Press and the Scottish Poetry Library (ISBN 9781857547955).

Among her books are:

- Laaksonen, Heli (2011). Peippo vei (The Chaffinch Took It). Helsinki: Otava. ISBN 9789511250067.
- Laaksonen, Heli (2001). Pulu uis : runoja (Pigeon Swimming). Turku: Sammakko. ISBN 9525194124.

Laaksonen has recorded audiobooks of some of her works, specifically achieving a gold record for the poetry collections Jänes pussis (2003, Frog) and Ratio Sulavoi (2007, Otava).
