= Heli Speek =

Estonian documentary filmmaker

Heli Speek (born Häili Speek; 15 May 1948) is an Estonian documentary filmmaker. She is best known for her award-winning documentary titled Metskuninganna ('Forest Queen'). The film was released in 1999, it is a 28-minute documentary about a woman who lives alone in an Estonian forest with her dogs. For the film, Ms. Speek won first prize for a documentary short at the 2000 Balticum Film Festival in Denmark and the Best Documentary Award at the 2000 Blue Sea Film Festival in Finland.

== Personal life ==
Heli Speek is the daughter of Jaan Speek and Aino Võõbus. She was married to Estonian novelist Olev Remsu and has two daughters: Mari (born 1979) and Kadriliis (born 1981), as well as a grandson named Anti (born 2004).
