= Lludd and Llefelys =

Welsh prose tale

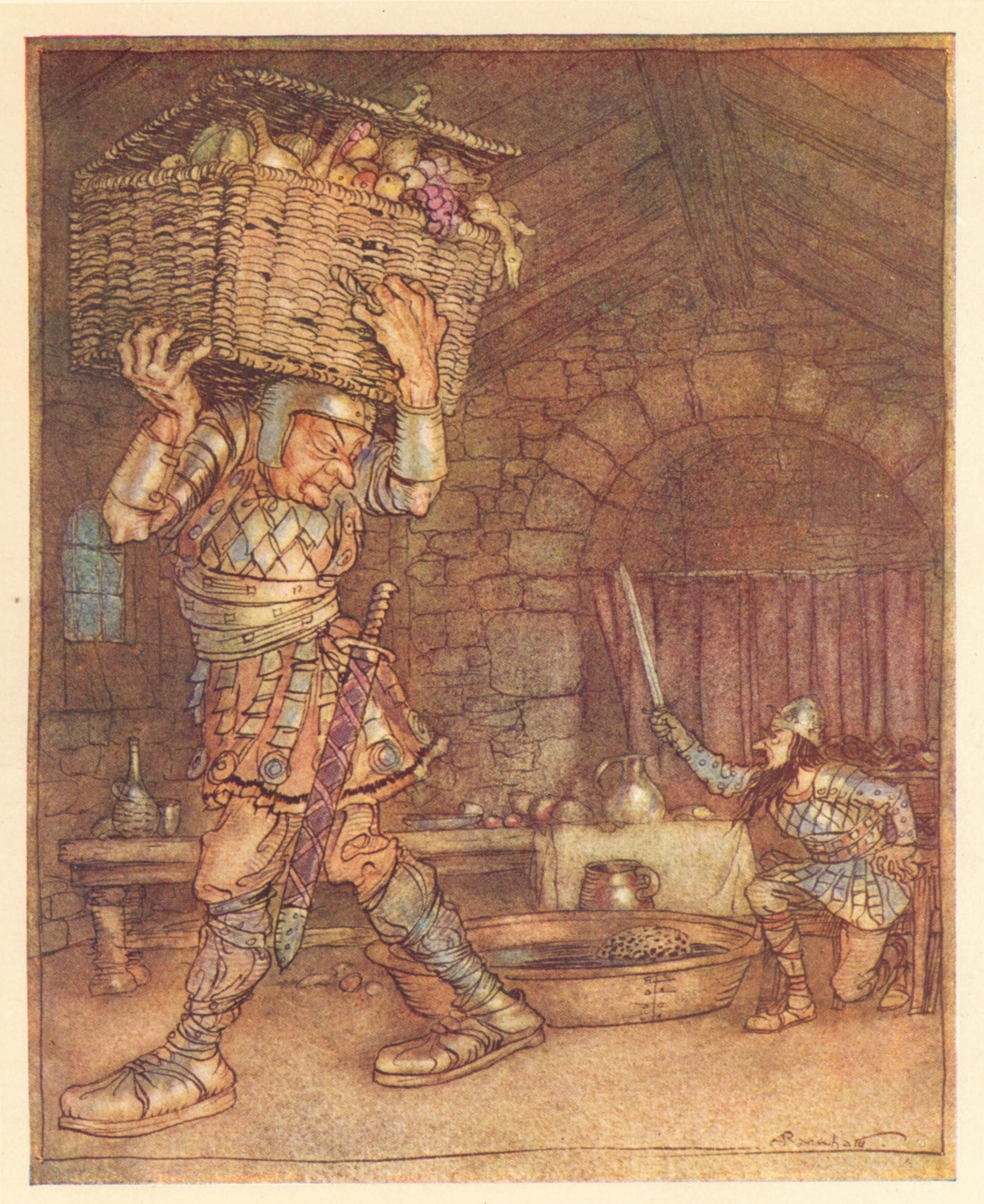
Illustration by Arthur Rackham, from The Allies Fairy Book from 1916. Lludd confronts the mighty magician.

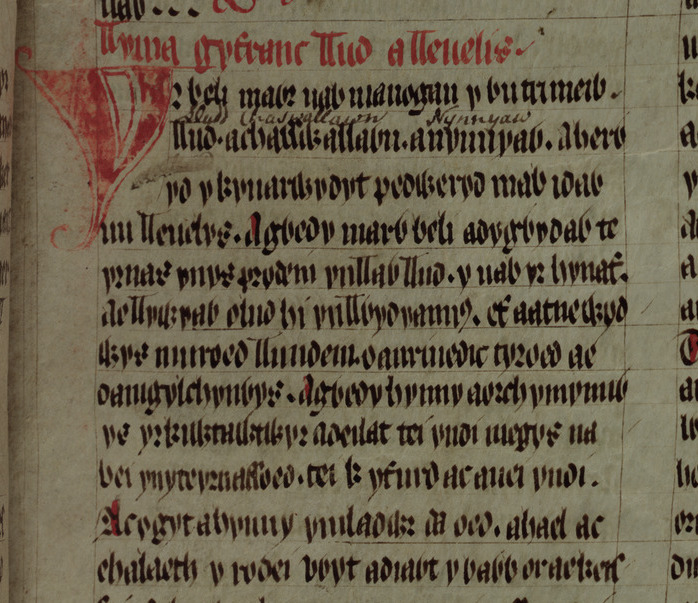
The opening lines of Lludd and Llefelys (Bodleian Library's manuscript)

Lludd and Llefelys (Welsh: Cyfranc Lludd a Llefelys, "The adventure or encounter of Lludd and Llefelys") is a Middle Welsh prose tale written down in the 12th or 13th century; it was included in the Mabinogion by Lady Charlotte Guest in the 19th century. It tells of the Welsh hero Lludd Llaw Eraint — known as King Lud in Geoffrey of Monmouth's Historia Regum Britanniae — and his brother Llefelys.

== Narrative ==
The story begins as Lludd inherits the kingship of Britain from his father, Beli. Soon after, he helps his brother Llefelys marry the princess of France and become king of that country. Though Lludd's reign starts off auspiciously – he founds "Caer Lludd", later to become London, as in Geoffrey – before long three plagues disrupt the peace. The first plague are the Coraniaid, who come to Britain and cannot be forced out because their hearing is so good that they can hear anything the wind touches. The second plague is a horrid scream that comes every May Day and causes all pregnant women in Britain to miscarry. The third plague involves disappearing provisions: no matter how much Lludd may put in his stores, it will have vanished over the course of the night. Lludd takes his fleet to France to ask his brother's advice.

With the aid of a brass horn that prevents the Coraniaid from hearing their conversation, Llefelys offers solutions to each plague. The Coraniaid, he reveals, can be killed by a mixture made from a certain insect. This mixture is harmless to Britons, so Lludd must convene a meeting of both groups and throw the mixture over everyone, thereby destroying the invaders. The second plague is caused by a red dragon that is embroiled in combat with a foreign white dragon. Lludd must set a trap for them at the exact centre of the island called Oxford, put them to sleep with mead, and then bury them underground in a stone chest. The third plague is caused by a "mighty magician", who casts a spell to make the whole court fall asleep while he raids their stores. Lludd must confront him, keeping himself awake with a vat of cold water.

Lludd returns home to Britain. He destroys the Coraniaid with the insect mixture and confines the dragons at Dinas Emrys. Finally he fights the "mighty magician", who submits to him to become his loyal servant.

== Origins and development ==
The earliest versions of the story appear inserted into certain manuscripts of the Brut y Brenhinedd, a series of Welsh adaptations of Geoffrey of Monmouth's Historia Regum Britanniae. The oldest surviving version is the one in the Llanstephan 1 manuscript, written between about 1225 and 1250. The tale's relationship with the Brut texts is significant; indeed, the early versions of the Brut have been classified by whether or not they include a version of it. Lludd and Llefelys also survives intact in the Red Book of Hergest and in fragmentary form in the White Book of Rhydderch, the two source texts for the Mabinogion. Both Mabinogion versions relied on the earlier Brut versions, but elements of the tale predate the Bruts as well as Geoffrey's Latin original.

The most noted part of Lludd is the episode of the two dragons, which is clearly related to a story that first appears in the 9th-century Historia Brittonum. Historia chapters 40–42 contain a narrative in which the tyrant Vortigern attempts to build a citadel, but the structure collapses repeatedly. His wise men tell him he must sacrifice a boy born without a father on the spot to alleviate the curse. Vortigern finally finds such a boy, Emrys (Ambrosius Aurelianus, identified with Merlin in later versions), but Emrys reveals the real reason for the collapsing towers: two dragons, one red and one white, representing the Britons and the Saxons specifically, are buried beneath the foundation. This story was later adapted by Geoffrey of Monmouth, and thence appears in the Brut y Brenhinedd. Thus, Lludd supplies an origin for the dragons in the Vortigern story.

Lludd, called Llaw Eraint or "Silver Hand", earlier called Nudd, was originally a figure of Welsh mythology and derives ultimately from the pre-Roman British god Nodens. He corresponds to the Irish mythological figure Nuada Airgetlám; Airgetlám means "Silver Hand". Celticist John T. Koch suggests that Llefelys' name is a compound, with the first element being Lleu (the name is usually spelled Lleuelis in the Red Book and White Book) lending his name to the Llewellyn dynasty of Welsh princes. Lleu is a major figure in the last of the Four Branches of the Mabinogi and is counterpart to the Irish mythological figure Lugh and the Gaulish god Lugus.

Elements of Lludd and Llefelys bear some similarity to Irish stories of Nuada and Lugh, the fullest account of which is the Cath Maige Tuired ("The [Second] Battle of Mag Tuired"). In this tale, Nuada inherits a kingdom (Ireland) and his kinsman Lugh is dispossessed. The kingdom is beset by oppressors, and as in the story of Lludd, both fertility and the food supply is affected, but Lugh returns and saves his people with his wit and skills. This may suggest that both the Irish and Welsh tales descend from an older, common story. Sioned Davies notes that Coraniaid may be a name for the Romans – otherwise Cesariaid and records that other Welsh Triads name the three plagues as Coraniaid, Gwyddyl Ffichti ("Goidelic Picts") and Saxons.
