= Nodens =

Celtic deity

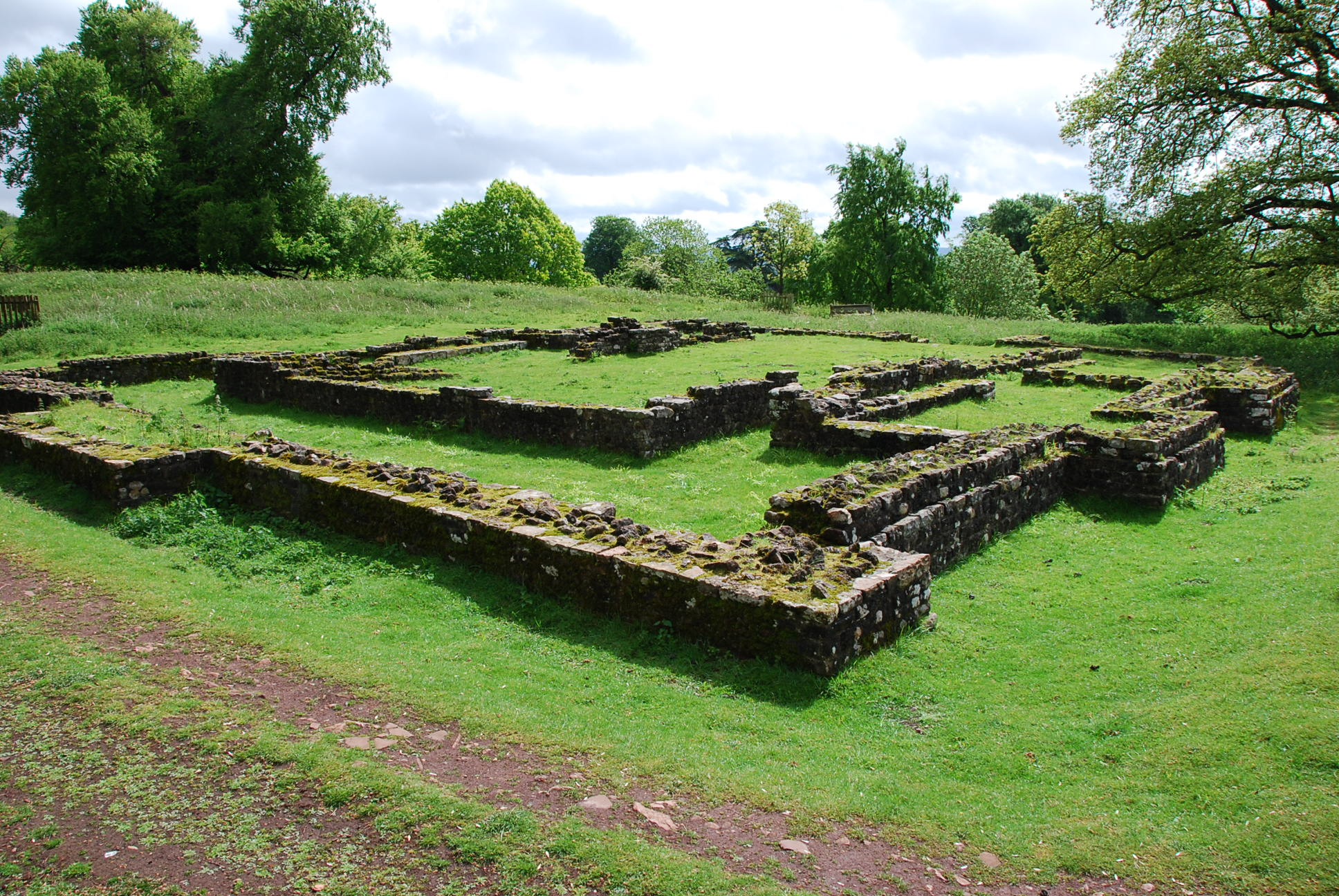
Tolkien visited the temple of Nodens, a place called "Dwarf's Hill" and translated an inscription with a curse upon a ring. It may have inspired his dwarves, Mines of Moria, rings, and Celebrimbor "Silver-Hand".

*Nodens, *Nodons or *Nudens (reconstructed from the dative Nodenti or Nodonti) is a Celtic healing god worshipped in Ancient Britain. Although no physical depiction of him has survived, votive plaques found in a shrine at Lydney Park (Gloucestershire) indicate his connection with dogs, a beast associated with healing symbolism in antiquity. The deity is known in only one other location, in Cockersand Moss (Lancashire). He was equated on most inscriptions with the Roman god Mars (as a healer rather than as a warrior) and associated in a curse with Silvanus (a hunting-god). His name is cognate with that of later Celtic mythological figures, such as the Irish Nuada and the Welsh Nudd.

The philologist and author J. R. R. Tolkien was invited to investigate the Latin inscription, and scholars have noted several likely influences on his Middle-earth fantasy writings, including the Elvish smith, maker of Rings of Power, Celebrimbor, whose name, like that of Nuada's epithet Airgetlám, means 'Silver-hand'. Nodens appears, too, in the works of Arthur Machen, as well as H. P. Lovecraft's Cthulhu Mythos.

== Name and origin ==
=== Attestations ===
The theonym *Nodens or *Nodons is reconstructed from the attested dative singular Nodenti or Nodonti, which is derived from a Proto-Celtic stem *Nowdont-. It is a cognate (linguistic sibling from the same origin) of the Middle Irish Nuadu and the Middle Welsh Nudd (which turned into Lludd, apparently from an alliterative assimilation). The masculine Nudi and Nudinti also occur in early post-Roman inscriptions from Britain. The Irish genitives nodot and núada(i)t (perhaps 'hand, wrist or arm') also appear to be related. It suggests that Nōdonti was the original form, by showing the back vocalism of the Celtic suffix -ont-. The development from -ō- to -ū- in Brittonic languages dates back to the end of the 3rd century AD. An Old Breton name Nodent (modern Nuz) may also be added to the cognates, although the vocalism raises phonological difficulties. The Middle Irish noun núada, núadu ('hero, champion, king [poetic]?') has been interpreted as the euhemerized name of the Celtic deity.

=== Etymology ===
The origin of the name remains obscure, scholar John Carey noting that "it seems at any rate safe to say that no etymology so far proposed can be accepted with full confidence".

The Welsh noun nudd means 'mist, haze, fog', and both Lludd and Nuadu are attached to the epithet '[of the] silver hand/arm', which could lead to a conjectural Proto-Celtic stem *snowdo- ('mist, haze'), from Proto-Indo-European *snewd^{h}- ('mist, cloud'; cf. Latin nūbēs 'clouds'), perhaps also attested in the Irish snuad ('appearance, colour'). However, the sound shift sn- > n- does not seem to be attested elsewhere in Gaulish (although -sn- > -n- is known) and remains difficult to justify in Proto-Brittonic (the sound change should have occurred later than the inscriptions). Scholars have also linked the Celtic names with the stem *néud- (cf. Gothic niutan 'to catch, attain, acquire' and nuta 'catcher, fisherman', Lithuanian naudà 'property'), associating *Nowdont- with the fishing (and possibly hunting) motifs of the Lydney remains and with the silver arms of Nuadu and Lludd. However, this stem remains unattested elsewhere in Celtic. A third alternative is the Proto-Indo-European stem *neh_{2}u-t- (cf. Goth. nauþs 'need, compulsion, distress', Old Prussian nautin 'need'), which could be found in Proto-Celtic *nāwito- ('need'; cf. Old Irish neóit, Middle Welsh neued), although linguist Ranko Matasović finds the relation "formally quite difficult" to explain.

According to Arthur Bernard Cook (1906) the toponym Lydney derives from the Old English *Lydan-eġ ('Lludd's Island'), which would connect it with Nodens. This borrowing would have occurred in the 7th century, when English speakers first came into the Lydney area. However, alternative etymologies of Lydney are offered in other sources. A. D. Mills suggests "island or river-meadow of the sailor, or of a man named *Lida", citing the forms Lideneg (from c. 853) and Ledenei (from the 1086 Domesday Book).

== Inscriptions ==
=== Lydney Park complex ===
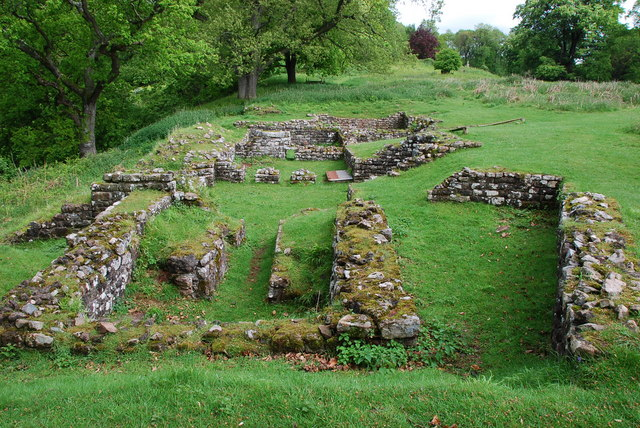
Bath house at the Lydney Park temple complex

The temple complex at Lydney Park, situated on a steep bluff overlooking the Severn Estuary, is rectangular, measuring 72 by 54 m (236 by 177 ft), with a central cella measuring 29 by 49.5 m (31.7 by 54.1 yd), and its north-western end is divided into three chambers 6.3 m deep. This imposing, Romano-Celtic temple building has been interpreted as an incubatio or dormitory for sick pilgrims to sleep and experience a vision of divine presence in their dreams. The site may have been chosen because it offered a clear view of the River Severn near the point at which the Severn Bore begins. Its position within an earlier Iron Age hill fort may also be relevant.

The temple complex was first excavated by Charles Bathurst in 1805, then reexcavated in 1928–1929 by Sir Mortimer Wheeler and Tessa Wheeler, who produced an extensive report of the findings at the site. Although no anthropomorphic depiction of the deity has been discovered, a dozen figures of dogs were found at the site, presumably deposited at the shrine as offerings by pilgrims due to the healing symbolism associated with dogs. As one of these figurines has a human face, it is possible that the deity himself could have been perceived as taking the form of an animal. A bronze arm whose hand displays the spoon-shaped fingernails characteristic of someone suffering from iron deficiency gives further evidence of the healing attributes of Nodens. Findings at the site include bronze reliefs depicting a sea deity, fishermen and tritons, a bronze plaque of a woman, about 320 pins, nearly 300 bracelets, (Note: In fact, over 270 bracelets with many more suggested to be in private ownership. As the findings attested metalworking at Lydney so it could be assumed that the bracelets were produced on-site.) and over 8,000 coins. Also present were oculists' stamps used to mark sticks of eye ointment, like those at Gallo-Roman healing sanctuaries in antiquity. The deity was further associated with aquatic and solar imagery, similar to other curative shrines of Roman Gaul.

Several inscriptions to Nodens have been found, one on a lead curse tablet reading:

| Devo Nodenti Silvianus anilum perdedit demediam partem donavit Nodenti inter quibus nomen Seniciani nollis petmittas sanitatem donec perfera(t) usque templum [No]dentis Rediviva | To the god Nodens: Silvianus has lost his ring and given half (its value) to Nodens. Among those who are called Senicianus do not allow health until he brings it to the temple of Nodens. (This curse) comes into force again. |

Other inscriptions identify Nodens, in various spellings, with the Roman god Mars:

| D(eo) M(arti) Nodonti Flavius Blandinus armatura v(otum) s(olvit) l(ibens) m(erito) | To the god Mars Nodons, Flavius Blandinus, weapon-instructor, gladly and deservedly fulfilled his vow. |
| Pectillus votum quod promissit deo Nudente M(arti) dedit | Pectillus gave to the god Nudens Mars the votive offering which he had promised. |
| D(eo) M(arti) N(odenti) T(itus) Flavius Senilis pr(aepositus) rel(igionis?) ex stipibus pos{s}uit o(pitu)lante Victorino interp(re)tiante | To the god Mars Nodens, Titus Flavius Senilis, superintendent of the cult, had (this mosaic) laid from the offerings with assistance from Victorinus the interpreter |

=== Cockersand Moss ===
A silver statuette, discovered at Cockersand Moss (Lancashire) in 1718 and now lost, had an inscription on its base that reads:

| D(eo) M(arti) N(odonti) Lucianus colleg(ae) Aprili Viatoris v(otum) s(olvit) | To the god Mars Nodons, Lucianus fulfilled the vow of his colleague, Aprilius Viator. |

Another reads:

| Deo Marti Nodonti Aurelius ...cinus sig(illum) | To the god Mars Nodons, Aurelius ...cinus (set up) this statuette. |

== Celtic parallels ==
=== Medieval Irish and Welsh ===
Nuada Airgetlám was the first king of the Tuatha Dé Danann, who was disqualified from kingship after losing his hand (or arm) in battle, but restored after he was given a working silver one by the physician Dian Cecht and the wright Creidhne (gaining the epithet Airgetlám, 'silver hand'), and later a flesh and blood one by Dian Cecht's son Miach.

The legendary Welsh hero Nudd appears in the Triads as one of the three most generous men in Wales, along with his two cousins, Rhydderch Hael and Mordaf Hael. His two sons are known as Edern ap Nudd and Gwyn ap Nudd. Nudd may also be called Lludd, and seems to be linked to other figures of the same name, such as the son of Beli Mawr in Cyfranc Lludd a Llefelys.

=== Interpretation ===
A linguistic parallel has been noted between Nudd's son Gwyn, ruler of the Welsh Otherworld, and the Irish Finn, both names meaning 'white'. In the sources, the name Finn refers to more than one figure: Finn mac Umaill, descended from Nuadu mac Achi, and Finn File, descended from Nuadu Necht.

Carey argues that the pairs Nuadu/Lludd and Finn/Gwyn reflect different aspects of the god Nodons. Nuadu and Finn share associations with water and dogs, while Nuadu and Lludd are linked by the silver arm and royal function. Gwyn diverges in ruling demons rather than heroes. Taken together, these overlapping attributes, along with the identification of Nodons with Mars on the Lydney and Cockersand inscriptions, may suggest an original deity encompassing all these functions, with later figures preserving particular facets. Carey further suggests that names built on finn- ~ gwyn- and the radiant crown of the Lydney charioteer may point to brightness as another attribute of the god. He concludes that Nodons may be understood as "a god of multi-faceted but consistent character: a shining royal warrior presiding over the chaotic in nature, society and the Otherworld (water, war, the devils of Annwn)."

According to Erich Poppe, images of dogs found at Lydney may also be compared to the later associations of the Welsh Gwyn ap Nudd with hunting.

== Legacy ==
=== Tolkien ===
Imagemap with clickable links. Apparent influence of archaeological and philological work at Nodens' Temple on Tolkien's Middle-earth legendarium

J. R. R. Tolkien, invited to investigate the Latin inscription at Lydney Park, traced Nodens to the Irish hero Nuada Airgetlám, "Nuada of the Silver-Hand". The Tolkien scholar Tom Shippey thought this a "pivotal" influence on Tolkien's invention of Middle-earth, combining as it did a god-hero, a ring, dwarves, and a silver hand. Mathew Lyons notes the "Hobbit-like appearance of [Dwarf's Hill]'s mine-shaft holes", and that Tolkien was, according to the Lydney curator Sylvia Jones, extremely interested in the hill's folklore on his stay there. Helen Armstrong commented that the place may have inspired Tolkien's "Celebrimbor and the fallen realms of Moria and Eregion". The name of the Elven-smith Celebrimbor of Eregion, who forged the Rings of Power in The Silmarillion, means "Silver Hand" in Tolkien's invented Elvish language of Sindarin. Dwarf's Hill with its many mineshafts has been suggested as an influence on the Lonely Mountain in The Hobbit and the Mines of Moria in The Lord of the Rings.

=== Lovecraft ===
Nodens appears as a deity in H. P. Lovecraft's Cthulhu Mythos. His appearance and action were based on a mixture of Celtic mythology, Roman mythology, and the deity's appearance in Arthur Machen's The Great God Pan. Nodens first appeared in Lovecraft's 1926 novella The Dream-Quest of Unknown Kadath, where he is an "archaic" god served by the night-gaunts. He is depicted as somewhat benevolent and as opposing the frightening Nyarlathotep. Nodens appears again in Lovecraft's short story "The Strange High House in the Mist", also written in 1926. When the protagonist, Thomas Olney, enters the eponymous house, he sees "primal Nodens, Lord of the Great Abyss" riding in a large shell that is carried by dolphins.

=== Paolini ===
In Christopher Paolini's Eragon, 'Argetlam' (lit: silver hand) is another name for the gedwëy ignasia (lit: "shining palm" in the fictional 'Ancient Language' made by Paolini for the series. It is adapted from the Irish word Airgetlam.
