= Beli Mawr =

Ancestral royal figure

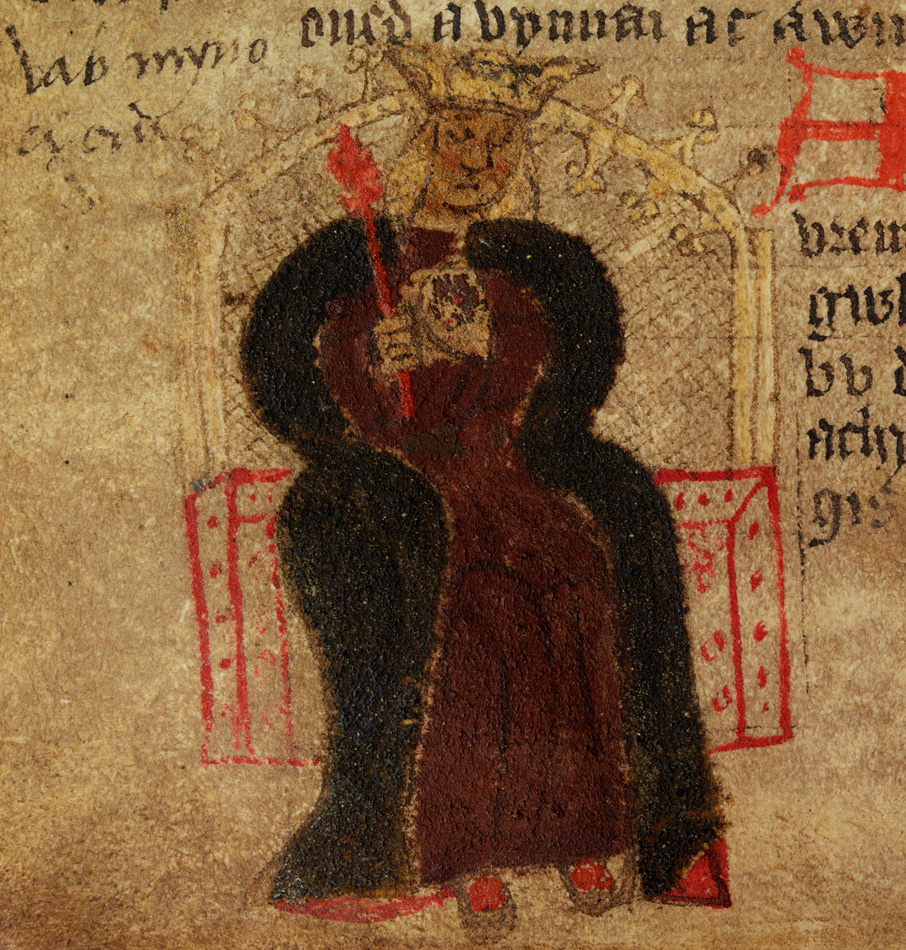
History of the Kings, Beli Mawr fab Mynogan

Beli Mawr (Welsh for 'Beli the Great') was an ancestor figure in Middle Welsh literature and genealogies. He is the father of Cassivellaunus, Arianrhod, Lludd Llaw Eraint, Llefelys, and Afallach. In medieval genealogies, he is listed as the son or husband of Anna, cousin of Mary, mother of Jesus. According to the Welsh Triads, Beli and Dôn were the parents of Arianrhod, but the mother of Beli's other children—and the father of Dôn's other children—is not mentioned in the medieval Welsh literature. Several royal lines in medieval Wales traced their ancestry to Beli. The Mabinogi names Penarddun as a daughter of Beli Mawr, but the genealogy is confused; it is possible she was meant to be his sister rather than daughter.

== Beli and Belenus ==
The origin of the name Beli is still a matter of debate among scholars. The most popular hypothesis sees the name Beli as a Middle Welsh reflex of the Gaulish and Brittonic divine name Belenus (also attested as a personal name), but a more recent alternative is that proposed by Harvard Celticist John T. Koch, who suggests that Beli derives from a Proto-Celtic name Belgius or Bolgios borne by one of the chieftains who led the Gallic invasion of Macedonia in 280–279 BCE against King Ptolemy Ceraunus.

Ptolemy was a member of the Ptolemaic dynasty, of which the famed Cleopatra was a member. It was founded by his father, Ptolemy I Soter, a Greek general and the successor of Alexander the Great. Koch therefore proposes that this great leader Belgius came to be regarded as the namesake and ancestor of the powerful Brittonic and Gallic tribal group, the Belgae, whence would have come the doctrine that Beli was the ancestor of tribal dynasties. The Belgae were also described by Julius Caesar in Commentarii de Bello Gallico, his diary on the Gallic Wars.

Beli Mawr is claimed as the head of the House of Gwynedd by the line of Cunedda Wledig, founder of the Kingdom of Gwynedd, following the End of Roman rule in Britain during the late 4th century under Magnus Maximus. The pedigree is shown in the Harleian genealogies, the oldest documented genealogies of Welsh royal families. In Welsh legend, according to the Welsh Classical Dictionary, Beli Mawr was born between 120 BC and 80 BC.

== Beli son of Manogan ==
Another Beli from medieval Welsh literature, who first appears in the 9th century Historia Brittonum and is often confused or conflated with Beli Mawr in both medieval and modern sources, is Beli son of Manogan (also spelled Mynogan). This Beli is actually derived from the historical pre-Roman Brittonic king of the Catuvellauni, Cunobeline and his son Adminius (or Amminius). Via a series of textual corruptions that span several different popular books from Late Antiquity and the early Middle Ages, the names of Cunobelinus and his son Adminius were combined and then jumbled, giving way to a new Beli, with the patronymic "son of Manogan":

1. Adminio, Cunobellini Brittannorum regis filio (Suetonius, Caligula, Ch. 44)
2. Minocynobellinum Britannorum regis filium (Orosius, Historia Adversus Paganos, vii 5.5)
3. Bellinus, filius Minocanni (Historia Brittonum, ch. 19)

Rachel Bromwich writes that such a figure has origins in traditional names/characters: "Beli Mawr is a character rooted far too firmly in Welsh tradition for his existence to be accounted for merely as an adaptation of Nennius's Bellinus. Further, Loth showed that Manogan itself can be explained as a Celtic name, since Monocan appears in the Cartulaire de Redon (RC LI, p. 10; Chr. Br., p. 152). Two further instances of this name in Celtic sources may also be included: Jes. Gen. XVIII Manogan m. Pascen m. Cadell; and the Ogham inscription MINNACCANNI (Macalister, Corpus Inscriptionum Insularum Celticarum I, no. 135)."

Thus, although Beli became a separate personage in medieval pseudohistory from Cunobelinus (Welsh Cynfelyn, Shakespeare's Cymbeline), he was generally presented as a king reigning in the period immediately before the Roman invasion; his "son" Caswallawn is the historical Cassivellaunus.

== Henry of Huntingdon's Belinus ==
The 12th-century English historian Henry of Huntingdon, in his Historia Anglorum first published in 1129, follows the Historia Brittonum in his discussion of Julius Caesar's invasion of Britain, mentioning a Belinus, brother of Cassibella(u)nus, who are both styled sons of Minocannus, but in later revisions of the text (and under the influence of Geoffrey of Monmouth), Liud (or Luid) (see Lludd Llaw Eraint).

== Geoffrey of Monmouth's Heli ==
Beli also appears in Geoffrey of Monmouth's history Historia Regum Britanniae (1130s) as the British king Heli, son of Digueillus and father of Lud, Cassivellaunus and Nennius. He is said to have held the throne for 40 years, after which he was succeeded by his son Lud (Llud). In the Middle Welsh translations of Geoffrey's work known collectively as Brut y Brenhinedd, Heli's name was restored to Beli and his father renamed to Manogan.

Legendary titles
Preceded by Digueillus	King of Britain	Succeeded by Lud
