= Heli Jantunen =

Finnish researcher and inventor

- Born: December 10, 1958 (age 67)
- Education: University of Oulu
- Known for: Electroceramics
- Scientific career
- Workplaces: University of Oulu
- Thesis: A novel low temperature co-firing ceramic (LTCC) material for Telecommunication devices (2001)

Heli Maarit Jantunen (born December 10, 1958) is a Finnish Professor of Technology at the University of Oulu and a member of the Scientific Advisory Board for the National Defense. She works on microelectronics and is a member of the 6G Flagship.

== Education and early career ==
Jantunen studied at the University of Oulu. After graduating, she studied a range of graduate degrees and eventually spent ten years in industry. In 2001 she returned to the University of Oulu for her doctoral studies, studying ceramic materials for use in telecommunications. She used low temperature co-firing ceramics to create radio frequency and microwave components. She was appointed to the faculty at the University of Oulu in 2004.

== Research and career ==
Jantunen was made Head of the Department of Electrical Engineering at the University of Oulu in 2008. Jantunen was supported by a European Research Council grant to investigate low temperature ceramics. She is interested in materials that can be printed on paper to use in novel electronic devices.

She demonstrated that it is possible to make electroceramics that can operate at low temperatures, making it possible to use 3D printing and low cost fabrication techniques. Before the work of Jantunen, the temperature required to produce electroceramics has been too high to process with semiconductor and polymers. Jantunen has reduced the ceramic production temperature below 500 °C, making it possible to integrate with heat sensitive materials and reducing energy costs by up to 30 %. Jantunen uses sintering to create a solid without melting. She has also demonstrated it is possible to integrate low temperature ceramics with carbon nanotubes.

=== Awards and honours ===
Her awards and honours include;

- 2013 Elected to the World Academy of Ceramics
- 2013 Elected to the Academy of Technical Sciences
- 2014 Linköping University honorary doctorate
- 2018 Nokia Foundation Award
- 2016 Parliamentary Innovation Award for Women
- 2019 Finnish Science Prize Finnish science prize

Jantunen has over 70 patents. Jantunen is an Honorary Professor at National Taipei University of Technology.

=== Selected publications ===
- Jantunen, Heli (2008). "Low loss dielectric materials for LTCC applications: a review". International Materials Reviews. 53 (2): 57–90. Bibcode:2008IMRv...53...57S. doi:10.1179/174328008X277524. S2CID 110607944.
- Jantunen, Heli (2006). "Inkjet printing of electrically conductive patterns of carbon nanotubes". Small. 2 (8–9): 1021–1025. doi:10.1002/smll.200600061. PMID 17193162.
- Jantunen, Heli (2000). "Compositions of MgTiO3–CaTiO3 ceramic with two borosilicate glasses for LTCC technology". Journal of the European Ceramic Society. 20 (14–15): 2331–2336. doi:10.1016/S0955-2219(00)00145-X.
- Jantunen, Heli (2010). "Polymer–Ceramic Composites of 0–3 Connectivity for Circuits in Electronics: A Review". International Journal of Applied Ceramic Technology. 7. doi:10.1111/j.1744-7402.2009.02482.x.
