= Brut y Brenhinedd =

Collection of Middle Welsh versions of Historia Regum Britanniae

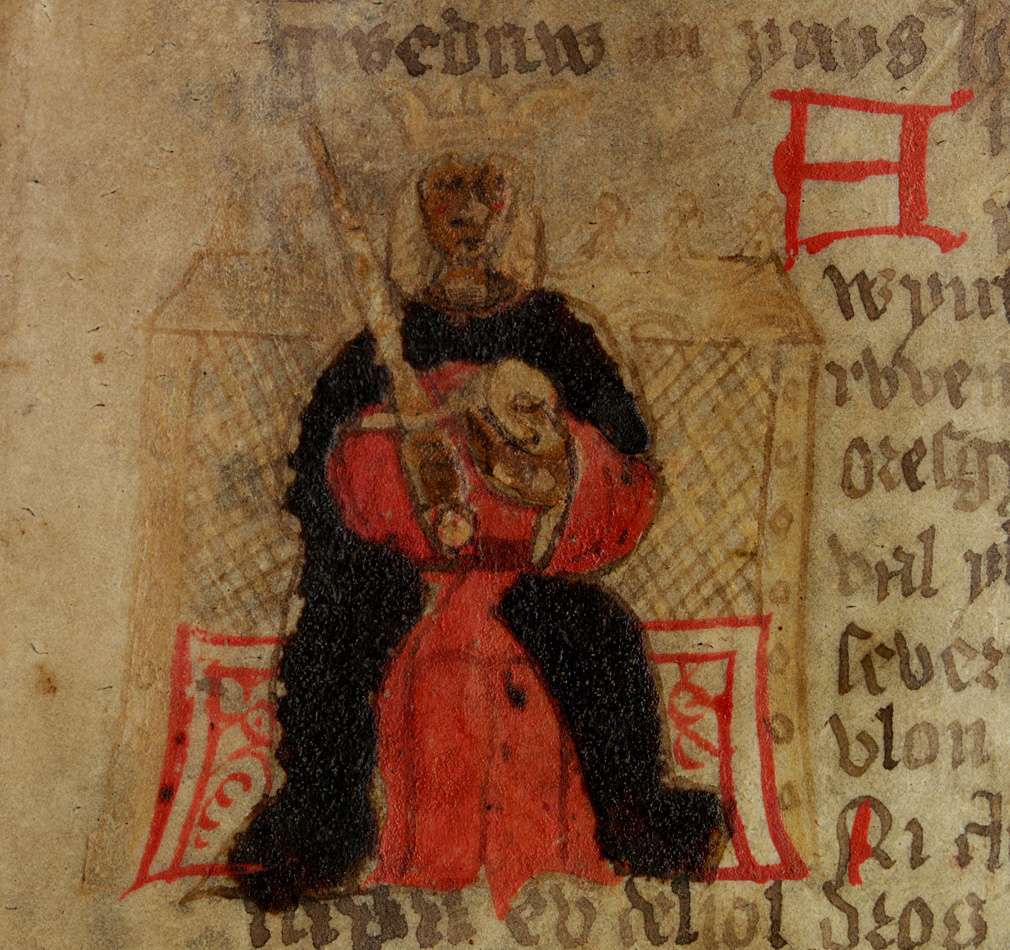

Brut y Brenhinedd ('Chronicle of the Kings') is a collection of variant Middle Welsh versions of Geoffrey of Monmouth's Latin Historia Regum Britanniae. About 60 versions survive, with the earliest dating to the mid-13th century. Adaptations of Geoffrey's Historia were extremely popular throughout Western Europe during the Middle Ages, but the Brut proved especially influential in medieval Wales, where it was largely regarded as an accurate account of the early history of the Celtic Britons.

== Geoffrey's Historia and the Brut y Brenhinedd ==
Geoffrey's Historia Regum Britanniae (completed by c. 1139) purports to narrate the history of the Kings of Britain from its eponymous founder Brutus of Troy to Cadwaladr, the last in the line. Geoffrey professed to have based his history on "a certain very ancient book" written in britannicus sermo (the "British tongue", i.e. Common Brittonic, Welsh, Cornish or Breton) which he had received from Walter of Oxford. It became one of the most popular works in the medieval West, but its impact was particularly profound and enduring in Wales, where the Historia was accepted as a largely authentic and authoritative account. The influence is most clearly evidenced by the existence of several translations into Welsh from the 13th century onwards, usually known as Brut y Brenhinedd. The manuscript history of these texts is a rich and long one attesting to the production of several translations and new redactions, most of which were copied many times over.

The Welsh renderings are not straightforward translations in the modern sense, but by contemporary standards, they are generally close to their Latin source text, with only some commentary or additional material from bardic traditional lore (cyfarwydd) appended to the text. Importantly, several manuscripts include a version of the tale known as Lludd and Llefelys inserted in the segment about Lludd Llaw Eraint; the presence or absence of this tale has been used to classify the early versions of the Brut. One notable area in which Welsh translators have corrected or adapted Geoffrey based on native traditions is that of personal names and soubriquets. For Geoffrey's "Heli", for instance, was substituted Beli Mawr, an ancestor figure who also appears in Branwen ferch Llŷr and elsewhere in Middle Welsh literature.

== Versions ==
There are about sixty attestations of the Welsh Brut in the manuscripts. Brynley F. Roberts, citing J.J. Parry and his own examination of the texts, places all the existing versions into six variant classes: 1) Dingestow MS., 2) Peniarth 44, 3) Llanstephan 1, 4) Peniarth 21, 5) Cotton Cleopatra B. v, and 6) the Brut Tysilio.

=== 13th century ===
- 1. The Brut in NLW, Llanstephan MS 1 (mid-13th century), is a relatively close translation of Geoffrey's Historia.
- 2. The Brut in NLW, Peniarth MS 44 (mid-13th century). This text becomes increasingly more condensed towards the end, omitting Merlin's prophecy in the process on stated grounds that it lacks credibility. Yet it has the distinct quality of being the first Brut to incorporate the tale Lludd and Llefelys.
- 3. Brut Dingestow (later in the 13th century), now in MS Aberystwyth, NLW 5266, once appears to have been in MS 6 of the Dingestow court collection, and may have originated in Gwynedd. Again, the text is a relatively faithful translation, aided by its occasional reliance on Llanstephan MS 1.

Of these three texts, it is Llanstephan MS 1 and Brut Dingestow which then came to provide the textual basis for many of the copies attested in other MSS from the 13th century onwards, such as Mostyn MS 117 and NLW Peniarth MS 16.

=== 14th century ===
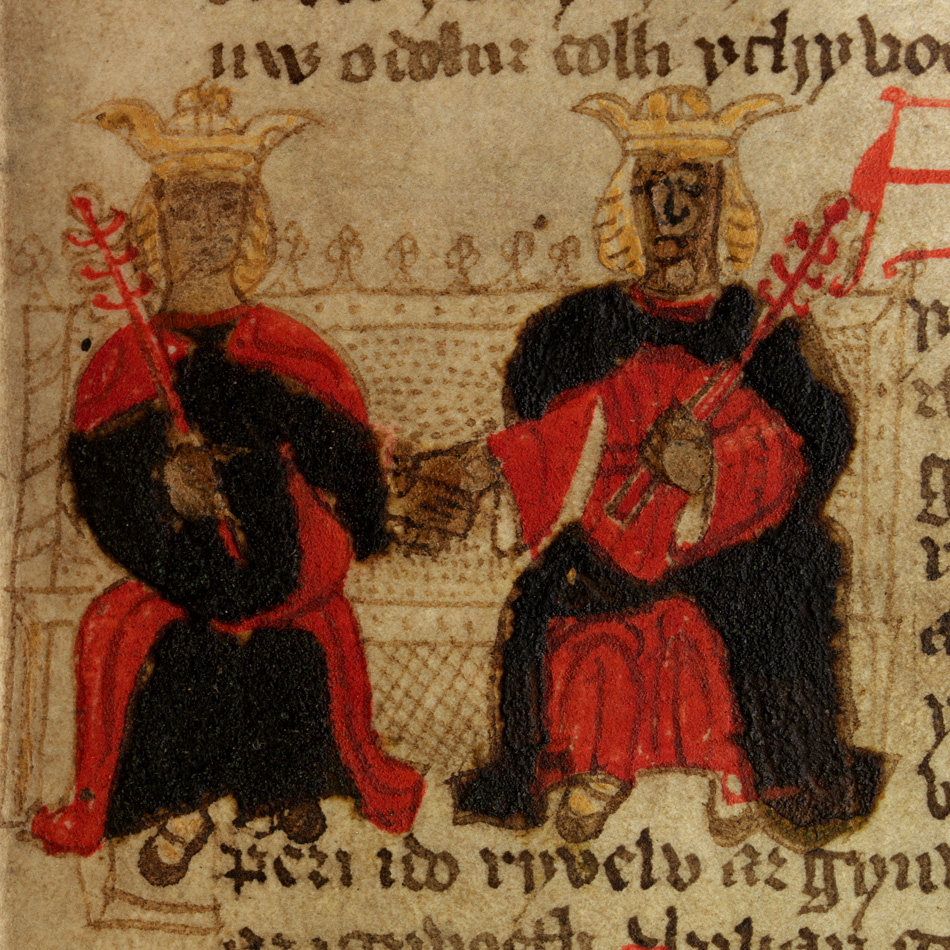
An illustration from Peniarth MS 23(f.18), Morgan and Cunedda

- Red Book of Hergest redaction. A revised version, presumably from south Wales, was produced which follows the Dingestow version up to the end of Merlin's prophecy, and continues with the Llanstephan 1 version. Copied in numerous MSS, this conflated version is most famously represented by the text in the Llyfr Coch Hergest or Red Book of Hergest. In most every manuscript, it is preceded by the Ystorya Dared, i.e. a Welsh translation of the De Excidio Troiae ascribed to Dares Phrygius, and followed by the Brut y Tywysogion. In this way, the text is made the central piece in a world history extending from the Trojan War up to events close to the redactors' own time. It seems that the Ystorya Dared, which has no independent existence in the manuscripts, was specially composed to serve as its prologue.
- 4. The Brut in NLW Peniarth MS 23 and elsewhere, a fresh and fairly close translation of Geoffrey's Historia.
- 5. The Brut in BL Cotton Cleopatra B. v, NLW MS 7006 (Black Book of Basingwerk) and elsewhere, appears to have circulated in north-east Wales. It represents a freer and more piquant version than was previously attempted and draws on some extraneous material, notably Wace's Roman de Brut (a Norman language work which was in turn based on Geoffrey's Historia) and a Latin chronology. In the manuscripts, it is sandwiched between the Ystorya Dared and the Brenhinoedd y Saeson ('Kings of the English'), a version of the Brut y Tywysogyon which incorporates material from English chronicles. Also included is a condensed version of the Lludd and Llefelys tale. This Brut is the version used for the Welsh historical compilation attributed to the late 15th-century poet Gutun Owain, as well as for the Brut Tysilio.

=== 14th or 15th century ===
- 6. Brut Tysilio. Oxford, Jesus College MS 28, transcript from Jesus College MS 61 (14th or 15th century) made by Hugh Jones in 1695.

== Brut Tysilio and Geoffrey's putative British source ==
The version known as the Brut Tysilio, attributed to the 7th-century Welsh saint Tysilio, became more widely known when its text was published in The Myvyrian Archaiology of Wales, a once-influential collection of Welsh literary material whose credibility has suffered due to the involvement of the antiquarian forger Iolo Morganwg, in 1801–1807. The editors did not place much faith in the attribution to Tysilio, using that title merely to distinguish it from another Welsh Brut entitled Brut Gruffudd ap Arthur (the chronicle of Geoffrey son of Arthur, an alternative name for Geoffrey of Monmouth). An English translation of the Brut Tysilio by Peter Roberts was published in 1811, and San Marte made a German translation of Roberts' English translation in 1854, making it available to non-specialists.

At the very end of the Brut Tysilio there appears a colophon ascribed to Walter, Archdeacon of Oxford, saying "I […] translated this book from the Welsh into Latin, and in my old age have again translated it from the Latin into Welsh." On this basis, some took the Brut Tysilio to be, at one or more remove, the "very ancient book" that Geoffrey claimed to have translated from the "British tongue". This claim was taken up by the archaeologist Flinders Petrie, who argued in a paper presented to the Royal Society in 1917 that the Brut and the Historia Regum Britanniae were both derived from a hypothetical 10th-century version in Breton and ultimately from material originating in Roman times, and called for further study.

However, modern scholarship has established that all surviving Welsh variants are derivative of Geoffrey rather than the other way around. Roberts has shown the Brut Tysilio to be "an amalgam of versions", the earlier part deriving from Peniarth 44, and the later part abridged from Cotton Cleopatra. It survives in manuscripts dating from c. 1500, and Roberts argues that a "textual study of the version […] shows that this is a late compilation, not different in essentials from other chronicles which were being composed in the fifteenth century".
