= Ancient Celtic warfare =

Warfare of the Ancient Celts

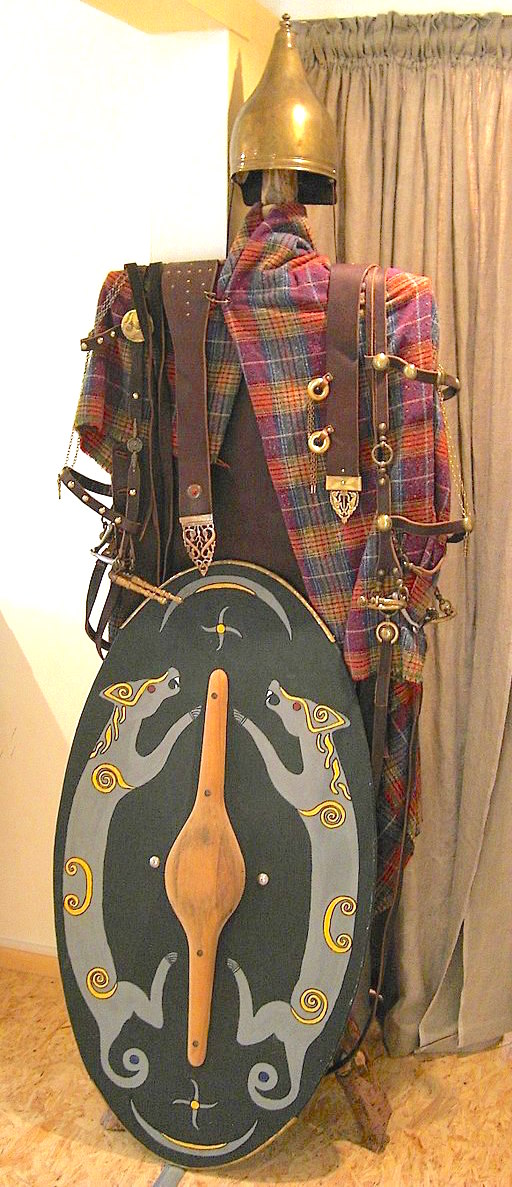
Replicas of a Celtic warrior's garments. In the museum Kelten-Keller Rodheim-Bieber, Germany.

Ancient Celtic warfare refers to the historical methods of warfare employed by various Celtic people and tribes from Classical antiquity through the Migration period.

Unlike modern military systems, Celtic groups did not have a standardized regular military. Instead, their organization varied depending on clan groupings and social class within each tribe.

Endemic warfare was a common and significant aspect of life in Celtic societies. However, the organizational structures of these tribes differed widely. Some had rigid hierarchies with ruling monarchies, while others operated with representational structures resembling republics.

Over time, the expansionist policies of the Roman Empire led to the incorporation of many Continental Celtic and some Insular Celtic peoples into Roman rule, such as peoples in Gaul and southern Britain. This resulted in the adoption of Roman culture by Gallic and Brittonic cultures. This led to the rise of hybrid cultures, such as the Gallo-Roman and Romano-British, during late antiquity. As a consequence, Celtic culture became predominantly confined to Insular Celtic peoples.

While archaeological discoveries offer valuable insights into the material culture of the Celts, the precise nature of their ancient combat techniques remains a topic of speculation.

== Mythological ==
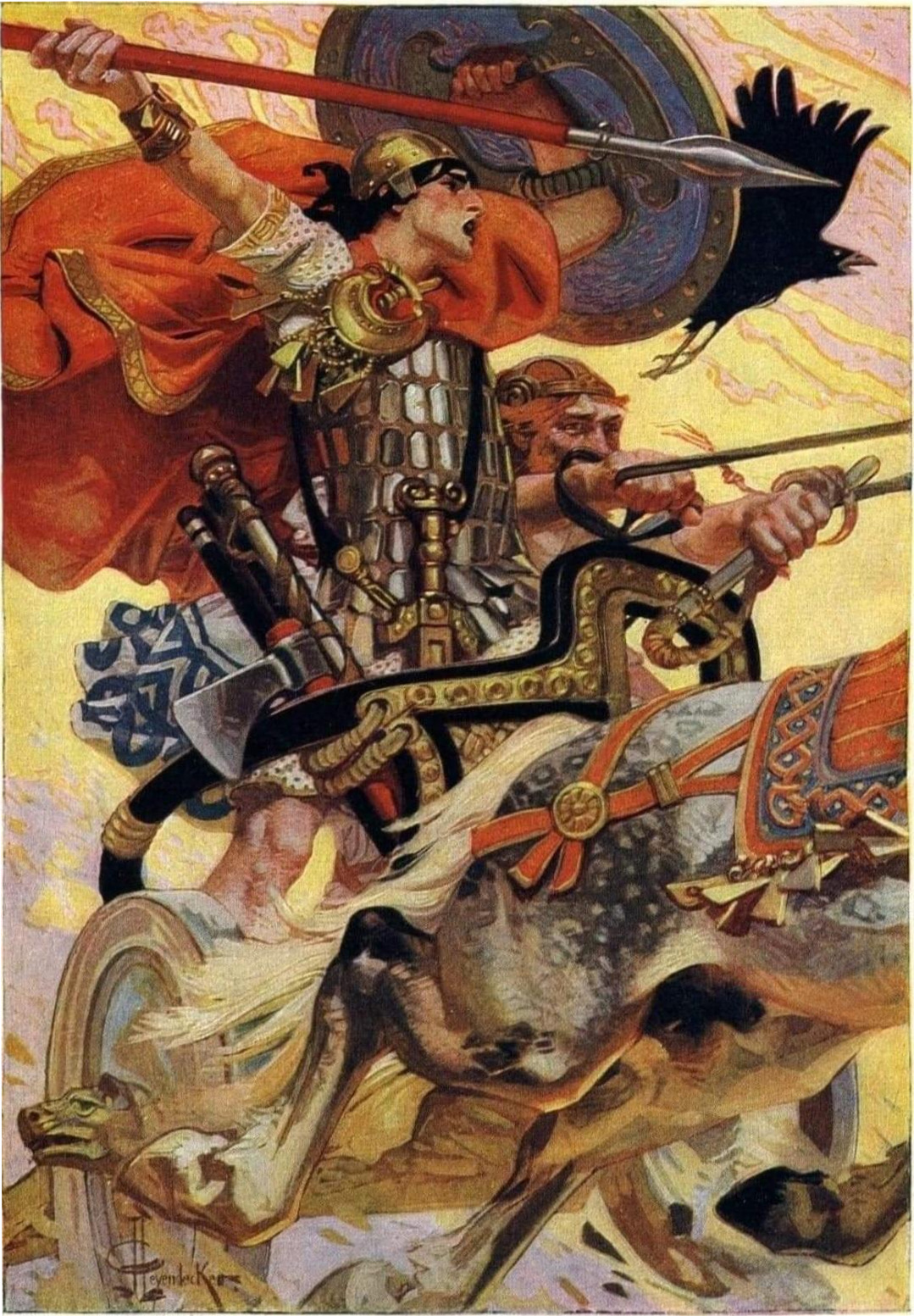
Cú Chulainn in Battle, illustration by J. C. Leyendecker in T. W. Rolleston's Myths & Legends of the Celtic Race, 1911. An artist's depiction of Celtic Iron Age Chariot warfare in Gaelic Ireland, although archaeological evidence of chariots have not yet been found in Ireland.

Celtic mythology is fractured, as the mythologies of most of the continental Celtic peoples, such as the Gauls, Galatians and Celtiberians, did not survive the Roman conquests, with only remnants found within Greco-Roman sources and archaeology. Most surviving Celtic mythology belongs to the Insular Celtic peoples who were able to preserve their myths and traditions with oral lore. These were committed to writing in the medieval period by Christian scribes, some time after the pre-Christian era they are supposed to depict. Irish mythology has the largest written body of myths, followed by Welsh mythology. Other surviving examples include Cornish mythology, Breton mythology and Scottish mythology.

Champion warfare was an important common aspect of Celtic mythology, with examples in the Ulster cycle, the Fourth Branch of the Mabinogi and the Arthurian cycle. In the Táin Bó Cúailnge, chiefly the story of Ulaid hero Cú Chulainn, he defeats an entire army from Connacht one by one in single combat.

This story describes combat centered on the use of the spear (gae) and javelin (gá-ín) with no mention of helmets or metal armor, which is consistent and in keeping with archaeological evidence. Chariots also played an important role in the warfare and culture of various Celtic groups, with chariot burials being an important and unifying aspect of Celtic cultures such as the Hallstatt culture, La Tène culture, Gallic and Brittonic cultures; no remains of these vehicles from the period have yet been discovered in Ireland.

== History ==
=== Tribal warfare ===
Endemic warfare appears to have been a regular feature of Celtic societies. While epic literature depicts this as a sport focused on raids and hunting rather than an organized territorial conquest, the historical record reveals it to be more about different groups using warfare to exert political control, harass rivals for economic advantage and, in some instances, conquer territory.

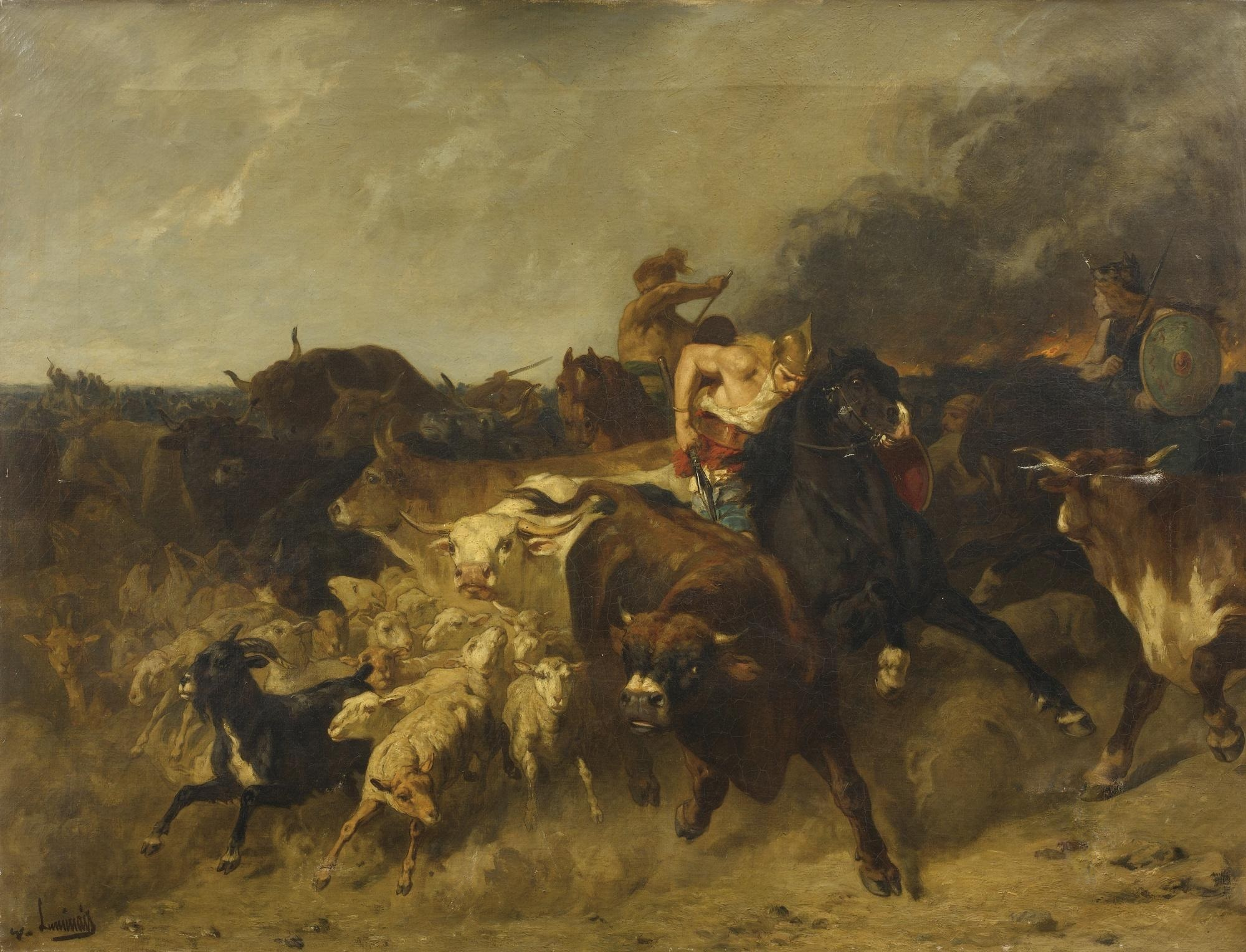
A raid between different continental Celtic tribes.

Celtic peoples fought amongst each other and would sometimes ally themselves with the Romans, Greeks, Carthaginians, Etruscans, Macedonians, Germanic peoples and various other peoples against each other and against other Celtic groups. The organizational structure of Celtic tribes and societies varied greatly, with some groups having strict hierarchical structures and a ruling monarchy, while others exhibited representational organizational structures typical of a Republic, especially by the time of the Gallic Wars.

Historical Celtic groups included the Belgae, Bituriges, Boii, Britons, Celtiberians, Gaels, Galatians, Gallaeci, Gauls, Helvetii, Lepontii, Picts, Norici and the Volcae. These groups often produced cultural offshoots through descent, diffusion, migration and Celticisation.

Archaeology provides much information regarding the material culture of the Celts, especially that of the La Tène culture and Hallstatt culture. However, the significance of these finds in determining how the ancient Celts actually fought is the subject of much speculation and debate. It was long thought, for instance, that the Celts were headhunters, but recent research from France has indicated that it may have been the heads of slain allies that were collected to be placed in porticos, while the defeated were dumped in mass graves, their weapons ritually broken.

==== Hallstatt cultures 1200 BC to 450 BC ====
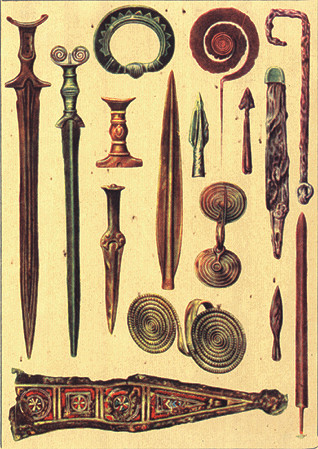
Hallstatt era Bronze Age weapons from Romania.

The Hallstatt culture is the earliest to be identified as associated with Celtic culture, spreading from north of the Alps west into France, Southern Britain and the Iberian Peninsula. The earlier phases of the Hallstatt era fall into the Bronze Age. Swords seem to have been the primary weapon from this period, perhaps indicating that warfare was a relatively small scale affair, possibly between groups of elite warriors.

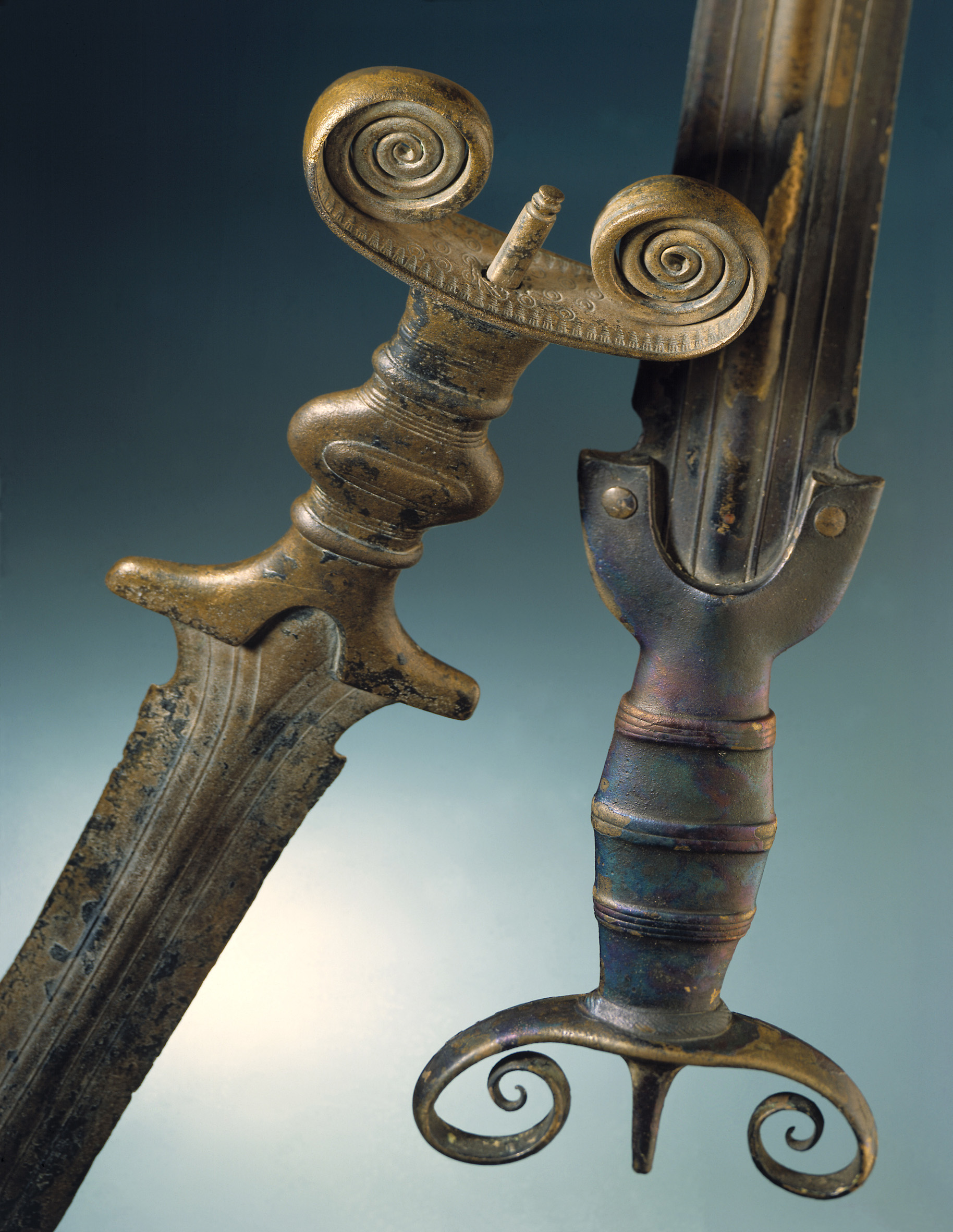
Antenna swords of the Hallstatt B period (c. 10th century BC), found near Lake Neuchâtel (in Auvernier and Cortaillod; Laténium inv. nr. AUV-40315 and CORT-216, respectively)

In the latter phases of the Hallstatt era, iron began to replace bronze in the manufacture of weapons, and the classic "Celtic sword" with its leaf-bladed design made its appearance. Chariot burials are also characteristic of the period. It is possible that chariots also served a function in the warfare of this age, but the chariots that have been discovered are four-wheeled vehicles and do not appear at all in Britain until the La Tène period.

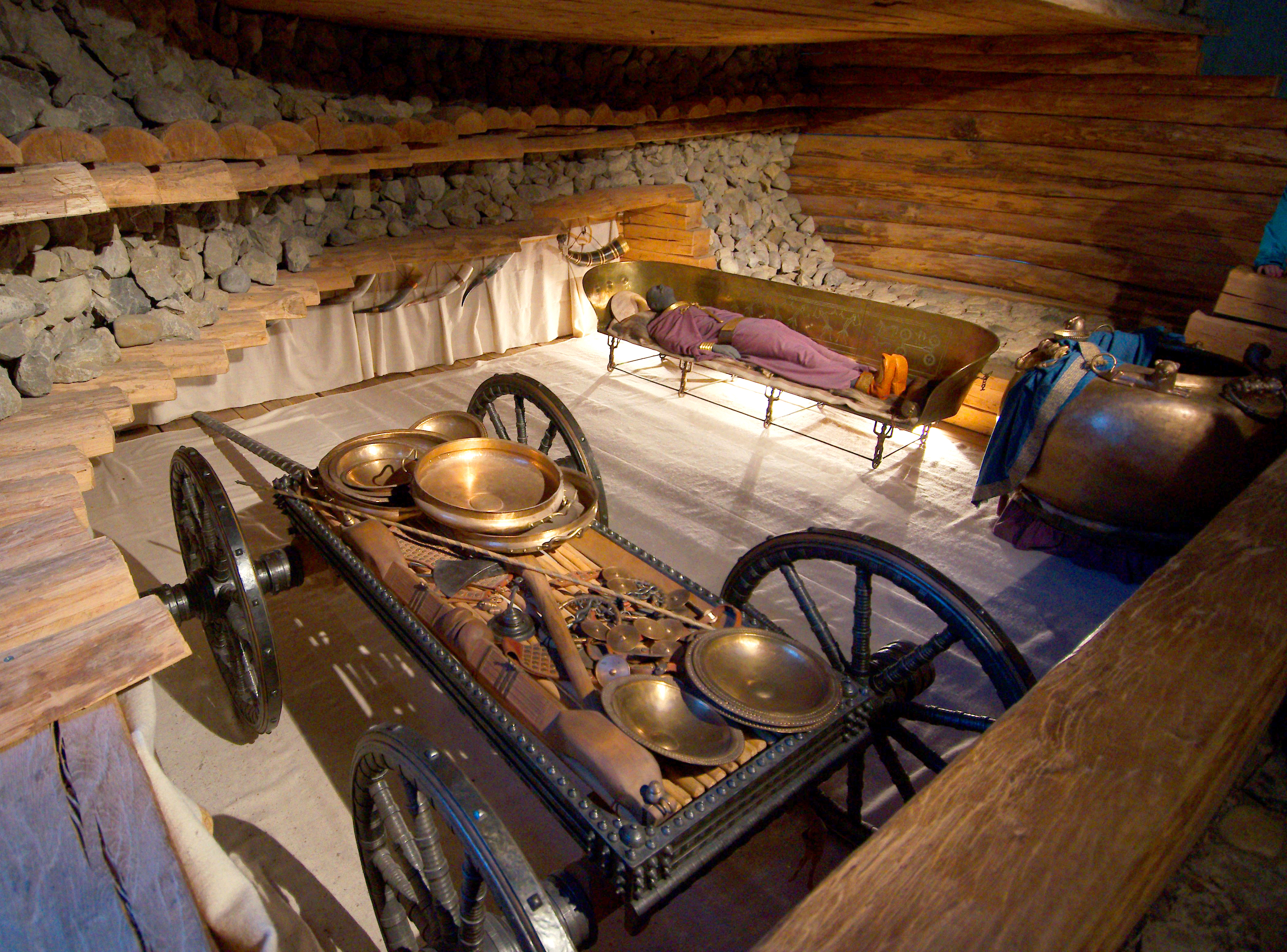
Celtic Chieftain's Grave at Hochdorf, Germany

At the very end of the Hallstatt era, the longsword seemed to fall out of favor, ousted by shorter, thrusting daggers which are found in greater numbers among grave goods in high status burials.

==== La Tène Culture 450 BC to 50 BC ====
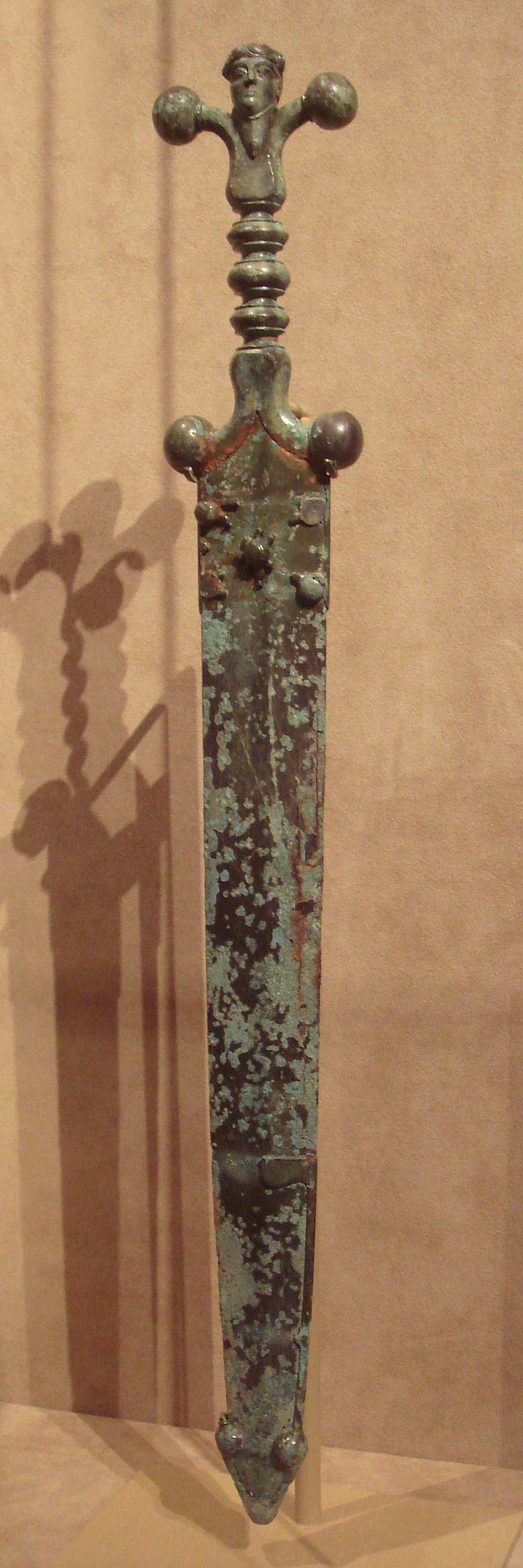
Celtic sword and scabbard circa 60 BC.

The La Tène period saw changing patterns of warfare. At the beginning of the La Tène period, warfare was likely conducted on a small scale between elite warriors, perhaps in chariots, wielding a new type of Celtic longsword.

During the succeeding centuries, the design of the sword changed, tending to become shorter, single-edged and lack a thrusting point, designed purely to make a cut (although the Hallstatt-era sword had also been primarily a slashing weapon). Greater regional variation in swords appeared: for example, in Britain and Ireland, longer swords were still shorter and thinner than their Continental counterparts. It is possible that, in the later La Tène era, an increasing population would have led to larger armies organized in ranks of spearmen, leading to a decline in the importance of the champion with his sword and hence a decline in sword functionality.

The La Tène era also saw the development of armor in the form of chainmail, garments constructed of linked metal rings. Finds of mail are rare, suggesting that it was a luxury restricted to high status warriors. Crested helmets of this period occur in greater numbers than mail, but overall it appears that Celtic armies of this era were made up largely of lightly armored, or unarmored, fighters.

Chariot burials continued well into the La Tène period, suggesting their continued importance in warfare. The La Tène chariot was a light, two-wheeled vehicle, unlike the heavier chariot of earlier times. The arrangement of the chariot poles in a reconstruction of the Wetwang Chariot suggests that they were drawn by small ponies, only 11 or 12 hands high, and thus seem unlikely to have been used in a frontal charge. Because chariot burials were never practiced in Ireland, the nature or existence of chariot warfare in that specific country remains unclear.

In the Later La Tène period, Roman expansion into Celtic areas began with the conquest of Gallia Cisalpina in 275 BC. The conquest of Gallia Celtica followed in 121 BC and was completed with the Gallic Wars of 58-50 BC. After this period, Gallic culture quickly assimilated to Roman culture, giving rise to the hybrid Gallo-Roman culture of Late Antiquity.

==== Continuation in Ireland ====
Roman conquest eventually extinguished the cultural and political independence of all the Celtic peoples, starting on the Italian peninsula, then moving to the Iberian Peninsula, Anatolia, Gaul and finally southern Britain. Celtic cultural independence survived only in Ireland, Scotland, Wales and Cumbria.

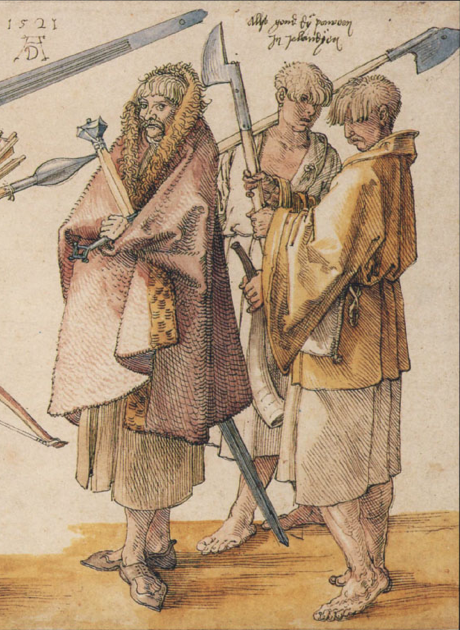
Three Gaelic Ceithearn. Drawing by Albrecht Dürer, 1521.

After the Roman era, a distinctly Celtic culture, peoples and style of warfare remained only in the British Isles. Ireland was the last region to adopt the La Tène style of Celtic culture and technology, with a smaller and less dense population than the British or Continental Celts. The Gaelic Irish thus sustained an era of small scale elite clan warfare for much longer.

Traditional patterns of warfare seem to have continued all the way until the Viking and Norman invasions. For centuries, the backbone of any Gaelic Irish army was lightly armed foot soldiers called Ceithearn or Kern. Kern usually fought without metal armor including helmets, although they were protected by a round shield (sciath), and wielded spears (gae) and a set of javelins or darts (gá-ín), a long dagger (scian), occasionally axes (tua) and bows (bogha), and, in the case of higher status and class warriors, swords (claideamh). The Viking invasions saw some adoption of the shortbow and heavier armor, albeit never in great numbers.

The Norman invasion in the 12th century, and the ineffectiveness of traditional tactics in resisting it, led to the Irish moving towards a more typically medieval style of warfare, exemplified by the Gallóglaigh or Gallowglass heavy infantry soldier. Unlike Kern, Gallowglass usually wore chainmail and iron helmets and wielded heavy weaponry such as the Dane axe, sparth axe, claymores and sometimes spears or lances. They were a kind of heavy infantry, shock troop and elite bodyguard for the Gaelic nobility. They were the Celtic response to the heavily favored and armored heavy cavalry, knights and men-at-arms of this era and were very effective.

=== Gallic Wars ===
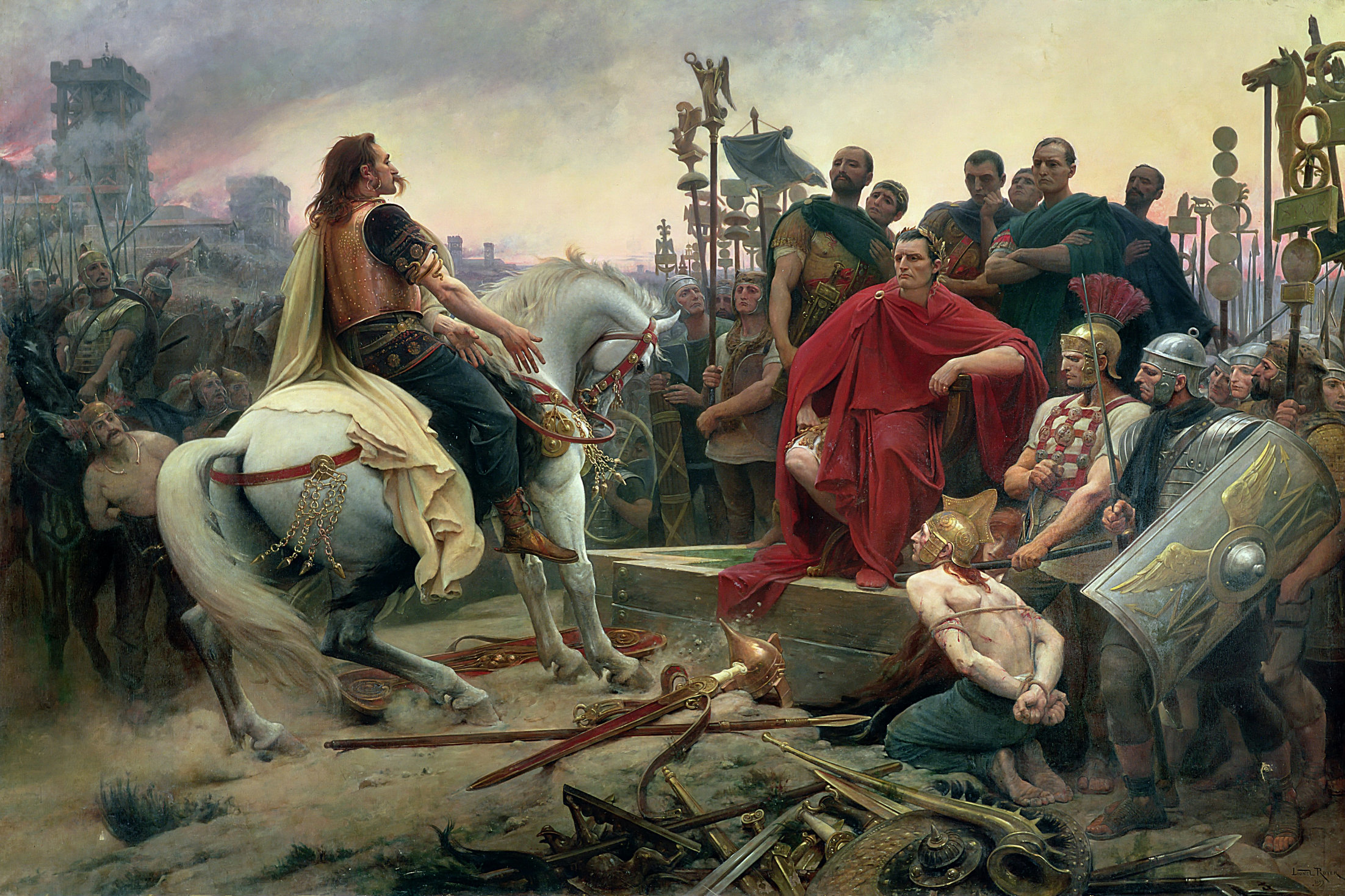
Vercingetorix Throws Down His Arms at the Feet of Julius Caesar by Lionel Noel Royer, 1899. A famous painting depicting surrender of Gallic Chieftain Vercingetorix to Julius Caesar following the Siege of Alesia during the Gallic Wars

The best known Roman source for descriptions of Celtic warfare is Julius Caesar's Commentaries on the Gallic Wars, in which he describes the methods of warfare of both the Gauls and the Britons.

The Gallic Wars were a series of military campaigns waged by the Roman proconsul against Gallic tribes, lasting from 58 BC to 51 BC. The Romans would also raid and invade Britannia and Germania. The Gallic Wars culminated in the decisive Battle of Alesia in 52 BC, in which a complete Roman victory resulted in the expansion of the Roman Republic over the whole of Gaul. These wars paved the way for Caesar (and later his anointed successor, Octavian) to gain unchecked control of the Roman Republic.

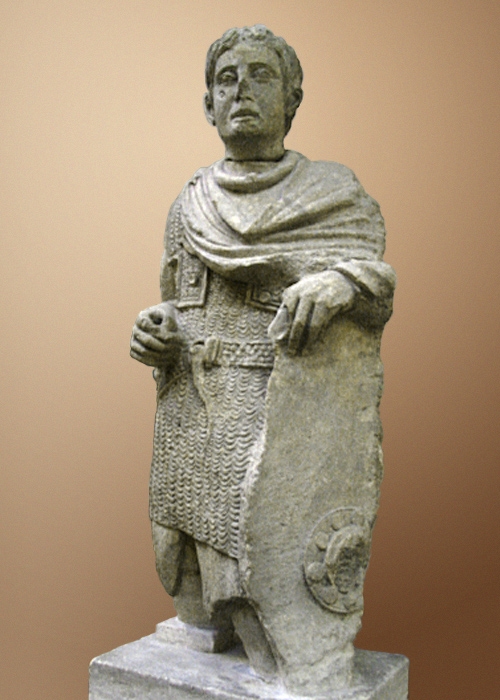
Sculpture of a chainmail-armoured, torc-wearing Gallic warrior wielding a Celtic shield, although depicted in the Greco-Roman style, from Vachères, France, 1st century BC

Descriptions of battles against various Gallic tribes do not support the popular picture of the wild and naked Celtic warrior. Caesar speaks of the Helvetii fighting in close order in an organized fashion, forming a phalanx as a defense against cavalry and advancing in a close formation. He also speaks of arrows being used against his troops crossing rivers and against the besiegers of Gergovia, capital of the Arverni - one of the few engagements in which Vercingetorix outmanoeuvred Caesar. He also mentions the use of javelins by the Belgic tribe, the Nervii, but, despite Roman writers frequently referring to the use of swords by the Celts in battle, Caesar never mentions Gallic troops fighting en masse with swords. By the mid-1st century BC, Celtic tribes in Gaul may have had a core of properly trained and equipped Gallic leaders, in addition to the tribal levy of lightly armed and armored Gauls.

It is, perhaps, the descriptions of the Britons which have most influenced the popular image of the wild Celtic berserker. Caesar purposefully emphasized the "barbarian" aspect of the Britons for political reasons, since his expedition was brief out of necessity and did not accomplish much except exploration. He describes how the Britons wore animal skins, had wives in common, did not grow crops and dyed and tattooed their skin blue; although his description does not mention which plant was used, subsequent commentators have supposed that woad was the source of this blue dye. Although later experimentation suggests that woad is not very well suited as a skin dye or tattoo ink, this image, when conflated with the descriptions of the Gaesatae, has nevertheless helped paint the picture of the woad-daubed ancient Briton or Pict charging into battle naked and blue.

The other popular image of pre-Roman Britain, the scythed chariot, is not mentioned by Caesar either but is alluded to by later commentators, such as Pomponius Mela, during and after the Roman conquest.

== Celtic troop types and organization ==
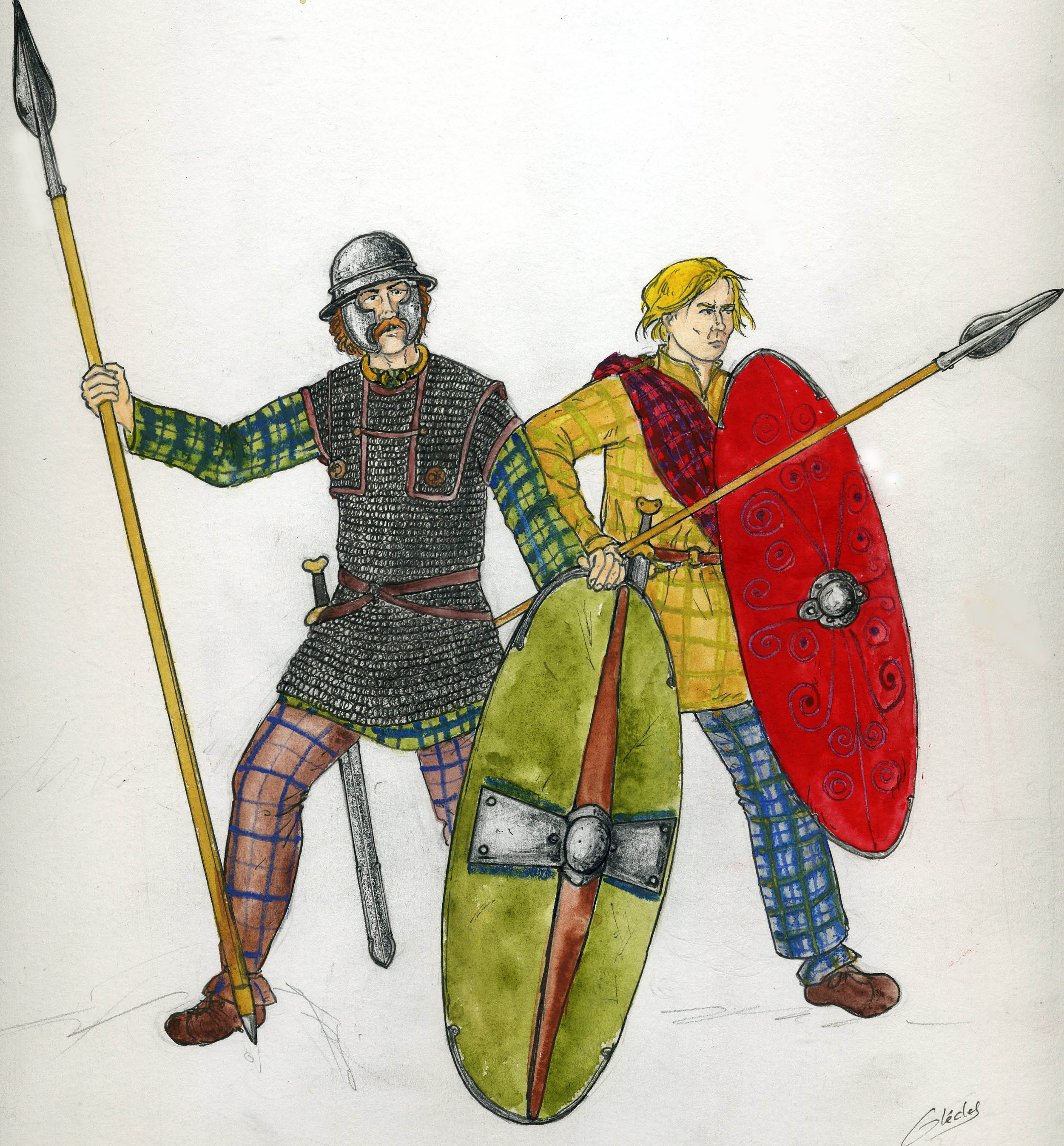
Celtic heavy (left) and light (right) infantrymen during Gallic Wars

No Celtic group employed a regular military as we would understand it. Organization was according to clan grouping and social class. A war leader's immediate companions were known in Gaulish as *ambaxtoi ("those who accompany"), a term which passed into Latin and from which the English ambassador ultimately derives.

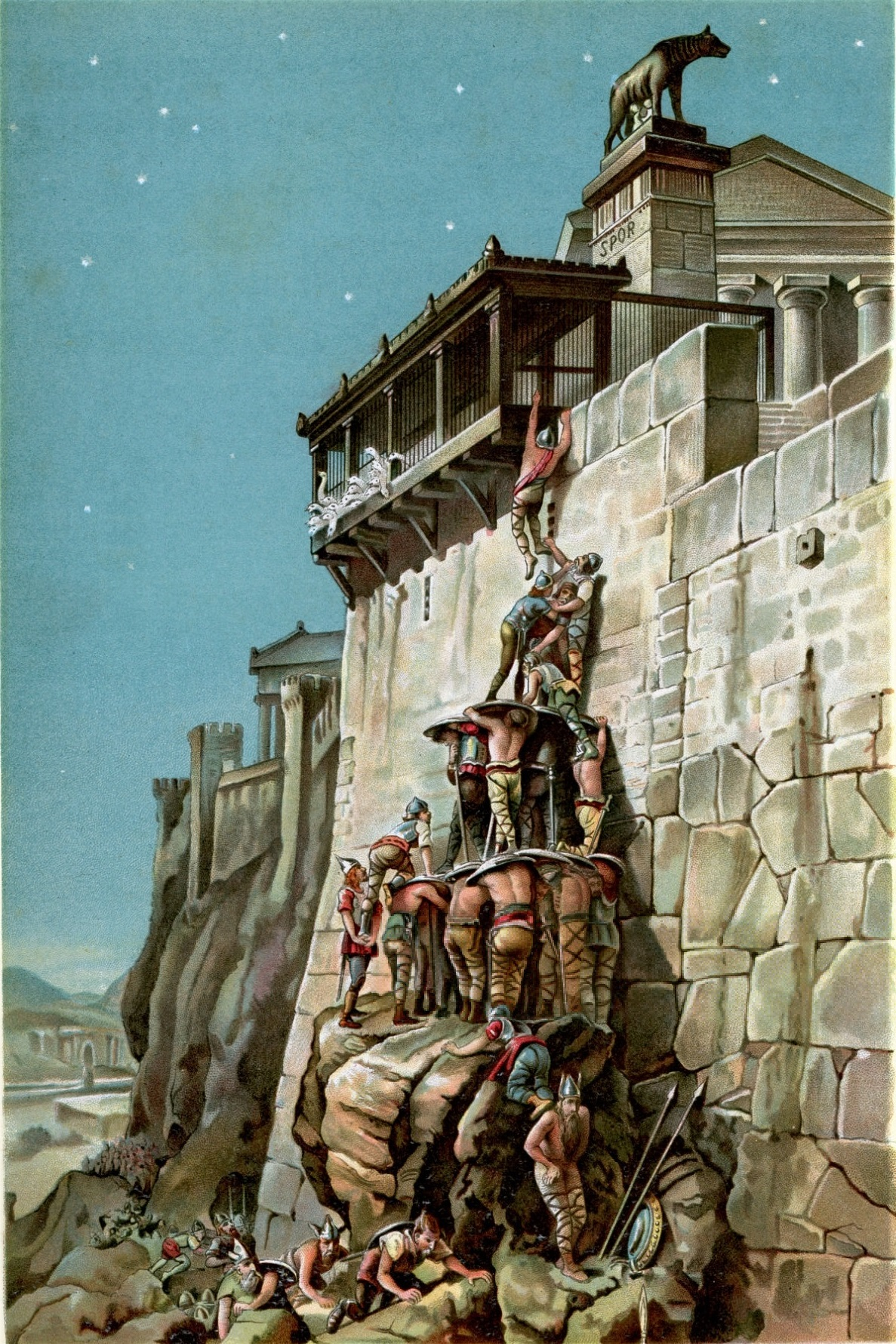
Gauls thwarted by Juno's sacred geese during the scaling of the Capitoline Hill following the Battle of the Allia in 390 BC. Contemporary color lithograph after a lost painting by Henri-Paul Motte (1883).

The earliest Celtic encounter with Romans in 387 BC, was an outright disaster for the Roman Republic. The resulting Battle of the Allia was a defeat and rout for the Romans, after which all of the city of Rome, apart from the Capitoline Hill, fell. A confederacy of Gaulish and Celtic tribes led by Brennus of the Senones occupied the city for a time before being driven out. Little to no detail is given about the methods of warfare of these Gauls, except that, according to Plutarch, some were armed with swords and some were mounted.

In 280 BC, a great army of Volcae comprising about 85,000 warriors left Pannonia, split into three divisions, and marched south in a "great expedition" to Macedon and Central Greece. Under the leadership of Cerethrius, 20,000 men moved against the Thracians and Triballi. Another division, led by Acichorius and a different Brennus, moved against the Paionians, while the third division, headed by Bolgios, aimed for the Macedonians and Illyrians. Leonnorius split off from the group with a sizable force into Thrace, heading further into Asia Minor where they ravaged the country to the shores of the Hellespont, compelled the city of Byzantium to pay them tribute, and then moved into central Anatolia. Phrygia, the region that these Celtic peoples eventually settled in, became known as Galatia after them. The Gallic campaign of Brennus eventually met the fierce resistance of a combined allied Greek Army at the second Battle of Thermopylae. The Celts were able to defeat the Greeks but at great cost. Despite the hollow Celtic victory at Thermopylae, Brennus pushed onwards to attack Delphi. Most scholars deem this Gallic Greek campaign a disaster for the Celts.

According to Pausanias, this force included large numbers of cavalry, organized in a system called Trimarcisia (from the words *tri- *marko- "three horse") which divided the cavalry into teams of three, only two of which would be mounted at one time. The second of Brennus' expeditions would have originated in Pannonia and Noricum, the same region which would later become famous for producing Noric steel, the highest quality available for armor and weaponry in the Roman Empire. Celts were renowned for their ability to make swords of both bronze and iron. Swords were too expensive for most common soldiers, so they fought with a spear, javelins or slings instead.

=== Infantry and cavalry ===
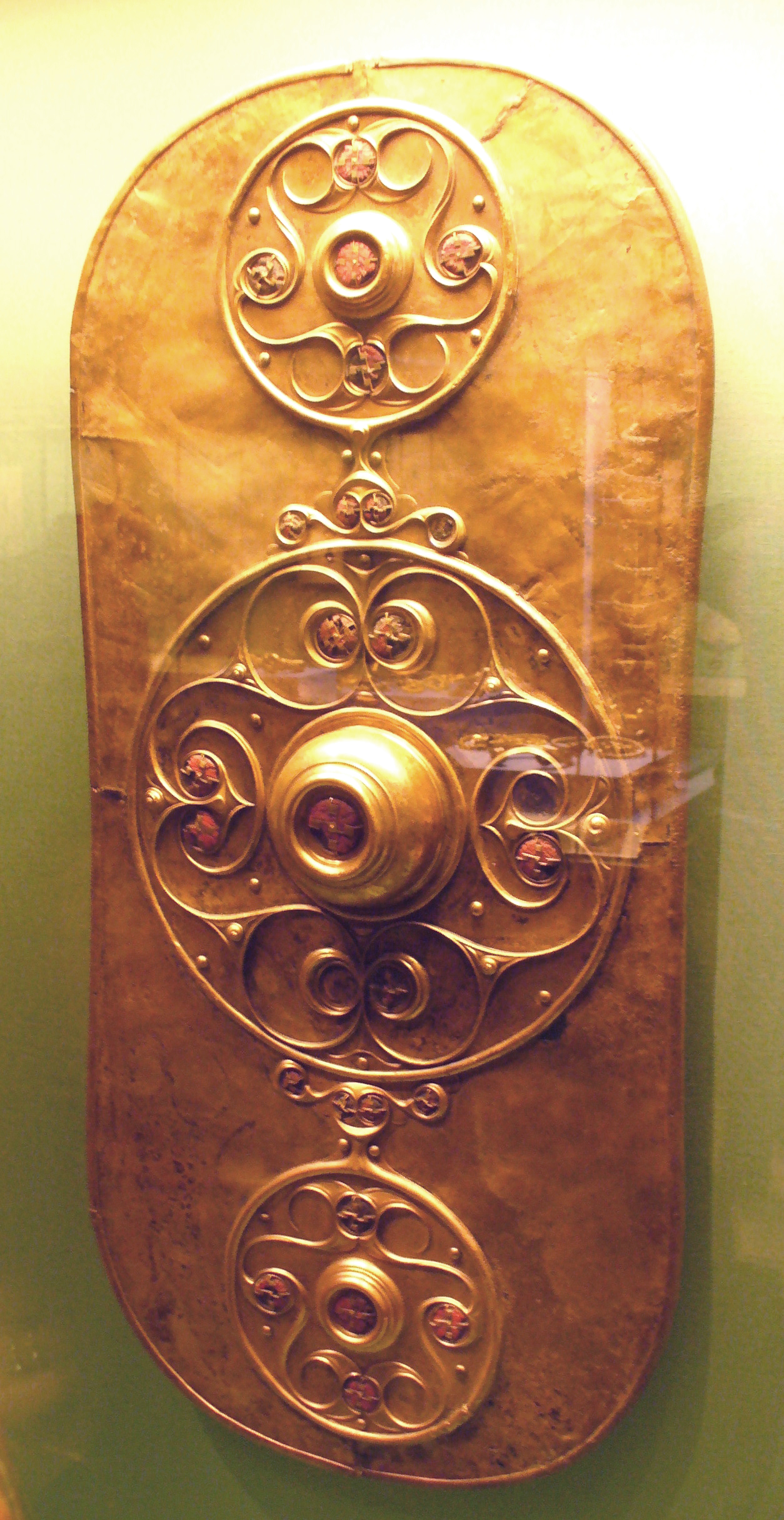
The famous Celtic shield found at Battersea likely used for ceremonial purposes.

Tacitus wrote that the strength of the Celts lay in their infantry, which proved true in many of the early encounters and engagements between the Celts and their Greco-Roman contemporaries. While Celtic infantry tactics and equipment varied greatly from group to group, they did have some core commonalities. The average Celtic warrior was equipped with a large oblong shield, javelins and a spear, and the wealthier warriors also carried a sword. While it might initially appear from Classical sources, such as Polybius, that the equipment of the Celts was, as a whole, relatively simple and generally inferior, the adoption of Celtic equipment and technology by many of their Classical contemporaries after engagements with the Celts presents a different picture.

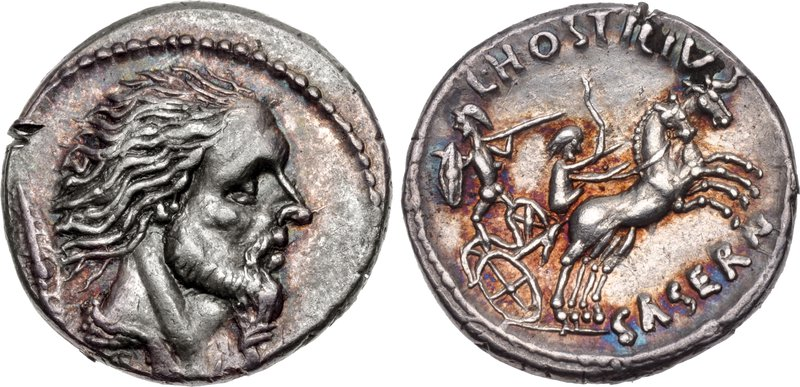
Roman Denarius coin, on the left: Depiction of a Gallic captive with a typical Celtic shield behind. On the right: Two warriors on a war chariot, one driving, holding whip in right hand and reins in left, and the other, facing backwards, holding shield in left hand and brandishing spear in right.

Celtic arms and armor were in fact highly advanced, as the Celts were renowned master iron workers in the Hallstatt and La Tène cultures, and in the province of Noricum. The Celts were described by classical writers, such as Livy and Florus, as fighting as hordes like "wild beasts". Julius Caesar contradicts these sources in his descriptions of battles against Gallic tribes in Commentaries on the Gallic Wars. Caesar speaks of continental Celts fighting in an organized fashion, even forming a Phalanx or Testudo-like formation as defense against advancing cavalry. This contrasts the enduring image of the unorganized naked Celtic barbarian, as depicted by other Greco-Roman sources.

Following the Celtic invasion of Greece in the 3rd century BC, elements of Celtic styles of weaponry and equipment spread both far and wide, such as chain mail-style armor, the Montefortino, Coolus and Aden-style helmets, thyreos-style body shields, and gladius and spatha-style swords. Even though Celtic peoples had access to iron swords and armor, they were only available to a select few within Celtic society. Thus, aside from the King, Chief and wealthy nobility, body armor was rare, with most warriors wearing colorful cloaks or tunics, shirts, and pants, although some may have stripped to the waist, or in some instances wore nothing at all into battle. The Celts’ main early advantage was their ability to scare and intimidate foes on the battlefield. Thus, even though most Celtic warriors were unarmored, the Celts fought in the manner of heavy infantry, using fear and shock tactics as a form of psychological warfare while closing in on enemy formations in dense masses in order to break enemy lines and rout formations. This was an incredibly successful and effective tactic at first, such as at the Battle of the Allia. The light equipment also allowed them to be more mobile compared to the heavy infantry of the Romans - it made them more vulnerable, but it also allowed for more effective and fast maneuvers.

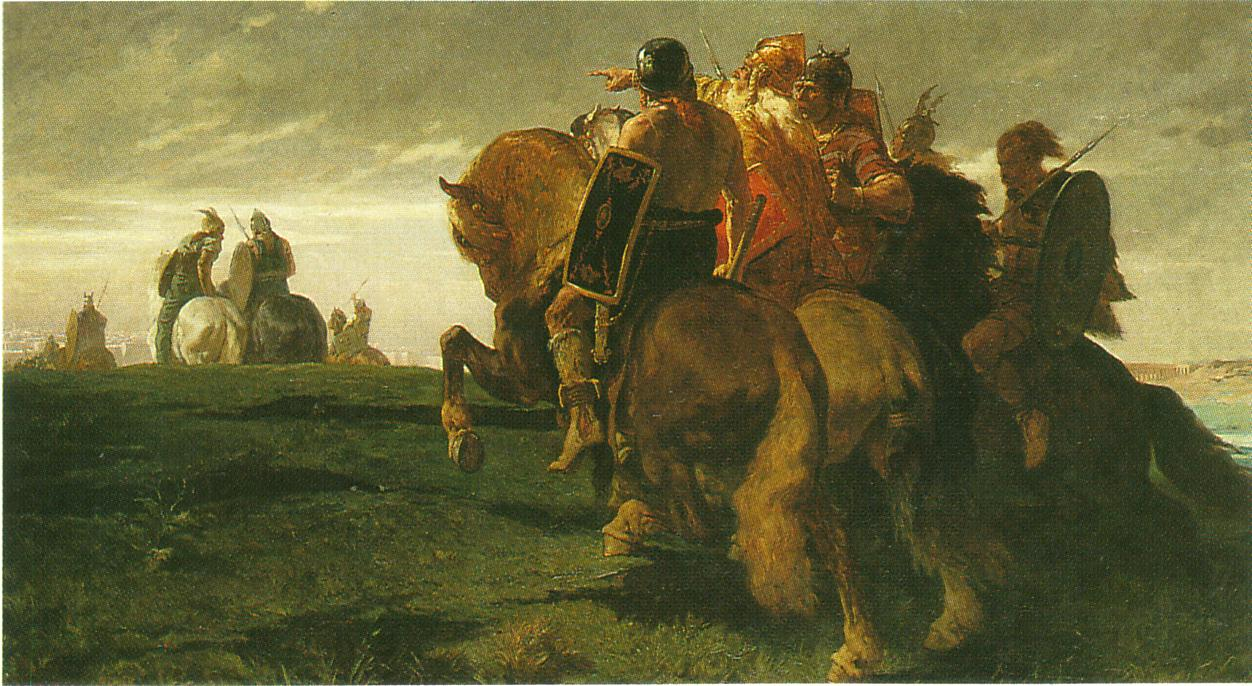
In Sight of Rome with Gallic horsemen depicted by Évariste Vital Luminais

Celtic peoples were also renowned for their skill as equestrians both on and off the field of battle. Horses played an important role in Celtic culture, with ownership being linked with both social status and wealth. Strabo even wrote that, though all Gauls were great warriors by nature, they fought better on horseback than on foot, and that the best of the Roman cavalry was drawn from their number. Auxiliary Gallic horsemen were commonly used by the late Roman Republic and early Roman Empire, having most notably fought for Crassus at the Battle of Carrhae. These Celtic mercenaries, led by Publius Licinius Crassus, held their own against a Parthian force during the key engagement. However, an ambush, the heavy armor of the Cataphracts, combined with use of horse archers and the parthian shot all contributed to their defeat. Pausanias described Celtic cavalry tactics while recounting the Celtic invasion of Greece by Brennus and Bolgios in his Description of Greece. He described a tactic called the Trimarcisia or the "feat of three horsemen", in which each mounted Gallic warrior was accompanied into battle by two attendants who each had a horse of their own. According to Pausanias, when a Gallic horseman was injured or killed, one attendant mounted the horse in his master's place, ready to continue the fight. If the first rider was only wounded, one attendant brought the wounded warrior back to camp, while the other took his place in the height of the action.

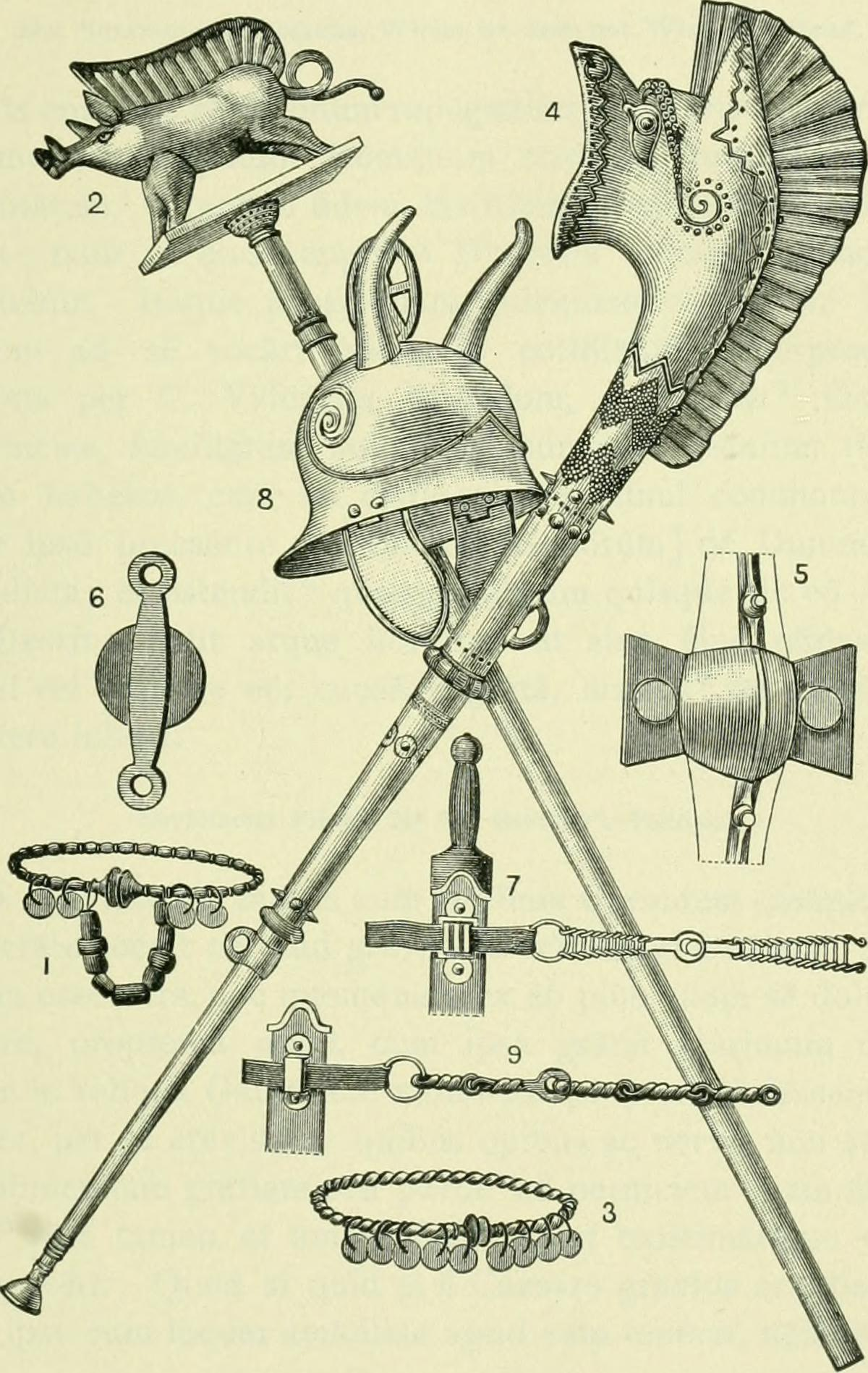
Gallic remains from the campaign against the Helvetii. 1 and 3. Necklaces with amber and coral pendants, 2. Military standard, 4. Carnyx, 5. Iron boss of shield, 6. Iron holder, 7. Sword-hilt and girdle, 8. Iron helmet, 9. Iron belt-chain.

The carnyx was a wind instrument of the Iron Age Celts, attested for ca. 300 BC to 200 AD. It is a kind of bronze trumpet, held vertically, with a mouth styled in the shape of a boar's head. It was used in warfare, probably to incite troops to battle and intimidate opponents. The instrument's upright carriage allowed its notes to carry over the heads of the participants in battles and ceremonies.

In earlier encounters with the Romans, such as the Battle of Sentinum, some Celts would employ the chariot. Although chariots had fallen out of use in continental Europe from the end of the 3rd century BC, Caesar found that they remained significant in Brittonic warfare. If his descriptions are to be believed, he encountered in Britain an army in transition, possessing cavalry but still with an elite fighting from chariots. He describes how these warriors would throw javelins from their vehicles before abandoning them to fight on foot and returning to them in order to retreat or redeploy. Cavalry proper is described as being used for skirmishing. Gauls are said to have commented that they themselves had formerly used chariots but had abandoned them by this time.

Their mode of fighting with their chariots is this: firstly, they drive about in all directions and throw their weapons and generally break the ranks of the enemy with the very dread of their horses and the noise of their wheels; and when they have worked themselves in between the troops of horse, leap from their chariots and engage on foot. The charioteers in the meantime withdraw a little distance from the battle, and so place themselves with the chariots that, if their masters are overpowered by the number of the enemy, they may have a ready retreat to their own troops. Thus they display in battle the speed of horse, [together with] the firmness of infantry.

=== Mercenaries ===
Celtic warriors served as mercenaries in many of the great armies of the Classical period. Some of the best known were those who joined Carthage and Hannibal in his invasion of the Italian Peninsula during the Second Punic War and who contributed to his victories in Lake Trasimene and at the Battle of Cannae. Celtic mercenaries notably fought for the Romans against the Parthians at the Battle of Carrhae. The Roman cavalry, composed primarily of Gallic horsemen, fought bravely and held their own against the Cataphracts but the inferiority in armor and equipment was evident and contributed to their defeat. Celtic warriors would often fight as mercenaries throughout Classical antiquity for various powers, such as the Romans, Greeks, Carthaginians and Macedonians. When a branch of Brennus' Balkan expedition turned east and crossed the Hellespont, they founded a Celtic-ruled state in Asia Minor known as Galatia. Galatia became well known as a source of mercenaries throughout the Eastern Mediterranean region. Illustrations showing troops armed with long, straight swords and oval shields have generally been taken to depict Galatians.

The Greek historian Polybius gives an account of the Battle of Telamon in 225 BC, in which the Romans defeated an invasion by the Boii, Insubres, Taurisci and Gaesatae. The Gaesatae were said to be a group of warriors who fought for hire, and it is they who are described in the most detail. Whereas the Boii and Insubres wore trousers and cloaks which were thick enough to afford limited protection from the Roman javelins, the Gaesatae removed their clothes to fight naked, standing in front of their allies and seeking to intimidate the Romans with shouting and gesturing. However, this lack of protection caused their defeat, since they carried relatively small shields which did not adequately protect them against the missile fire of the Roman skirmishers. Suffering heavy casualties, the Gaesatae either fled the battlefield or desperately charged headlong into the Roman lines where, outmatched in both numbers and equipment, they were defeated. What position the Gaesatae occupied in Celtic society has been much debated. Early writers assumed that they were a tribe, but later authors have suggested that they may have been groups of unattached young warriors who lived by raiding and mercenary activities, much like the early Roman iuventes or the semi-legendary Irish fianna.

There are accounts of Celtic soldiers working as mercenaries for many of the great dynasties of the Classical world including the Ptolemaic dynasty, the Seleucids and the Attalids. Notable figures such as Cleopatra VII of Egypt and Herod the Great of Judea were said to have Celtic bodyguards. Josephus, in his Antiquities of the Jews, mentions Gallic or Galatian soldiers present at the funeral of the King of Judea, Herod.

=== Navy ===
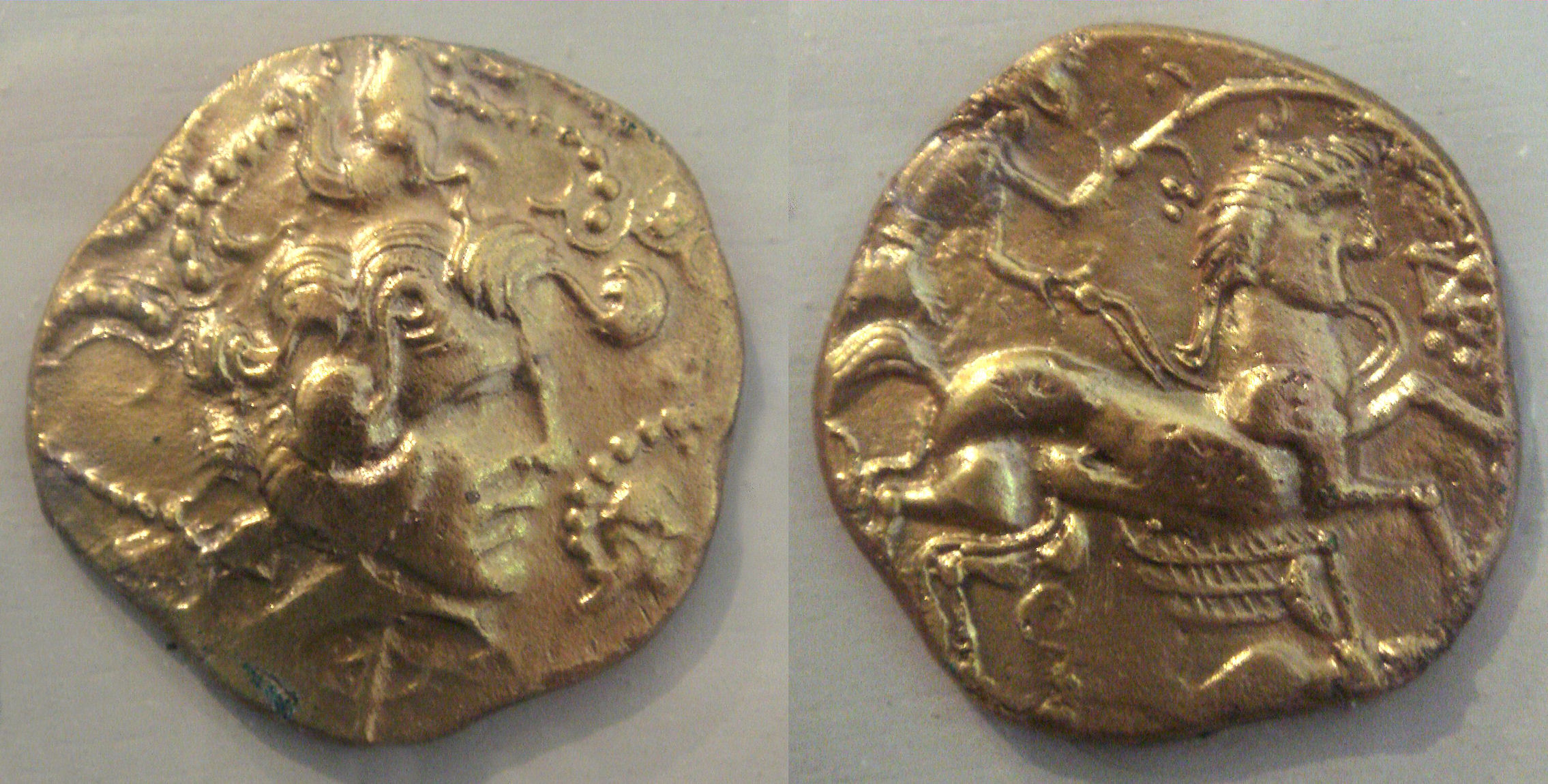
Veneti coins, 5th-1st century BC.

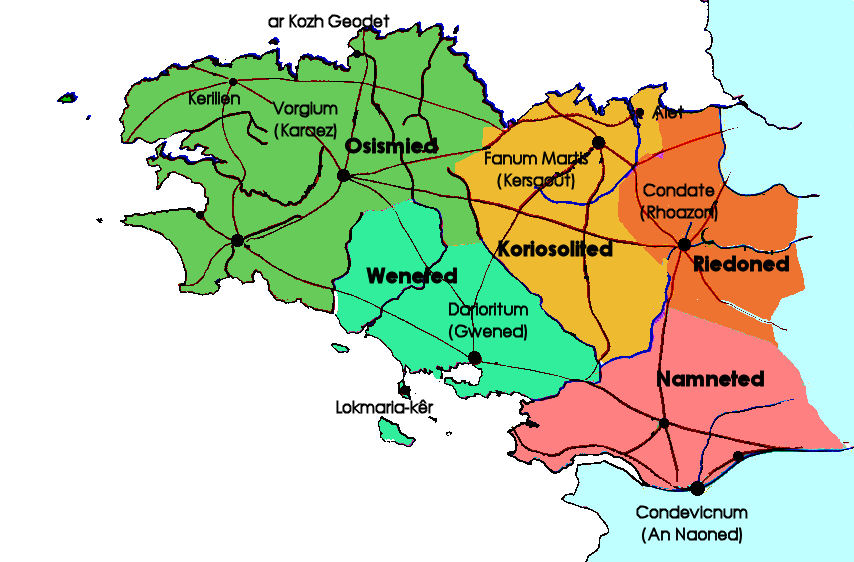
Map of the Gallic people of modern Brittany: Osismii Veneti Coriosolites Redones Namnetes Non-Gallic

While relatively little has been written about Celtic warfare at sea, the Gallic Veneti, a tribe dwelling on the southern coast of Armorica (Brittany), along the Gulf of Morbihan, was well known and renowned among the Gauls as a strong seafaring people.

The Veneti had trading stations in Britain and regularly sailed to the island, and they charged customs and port dues on trade ships as they passed through the region. They constructed ships of oak with tough leather sails, well adapted for traversing and plying the rough Atlantic sea. The Veneti designed and maneuvered their vessels so skillfully that boarding was near impossible on open water.

Following the beginning of the Gallic Wars, the Veneti fiercely resisted the Romans both on land and by sea during the period following Caesar's conquest of Gaul but before his invasion of Britain. They targeted the Romans for raiding and maintained positive trade relations with the Britons across the channel. Given the highly defensible nature of the Veneti sea strongholds, land attacks were frustrated by the incoming tide, and naval forces were left trapped on the rocks, vulnerable when the tide ebbed. Their capital, Darioritum, in modern-day Vannes, was extremely difficult to attack from land.

At first the Roman galleys, fighting in unfamiliar conditions, were at a great disadvantage and suffered defeats and setbacks. Julius Caesar gave Decimus Junius Brutus Albinus command of the Roman fleet and the Roman navy adopted new tactics in order to quell the activities of the Veneti once and for all. Instead of boarding or capturing ships, the Romans would simply set them on fire. The Roman fleet under Albinus subjected the Veneti to savage reprisals for their earlier defiance. This culminated in the Battle of Morbihan, when the Romans succeeded in setting aflame and destroying the entire Gallic fleet in Quiberon Bay, with Caesar watching from the shore. Following this defeat, their maritime commerce and trade activities declined under the Roman Empire.

== Fortifications ==
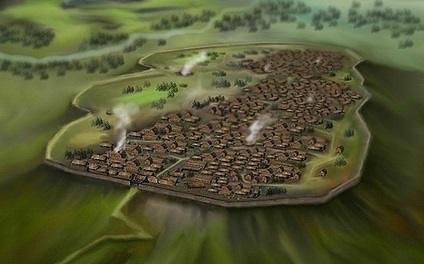
Modern-day rendering of a Celtic Oppidum, Central Europe 1st century BC

Large stores of slingstones, aerodynamically shaped by adding clay, have been found in the Southern British hillfort of Maiden Castle which indicates that slings must also have played a role in the conflicts between Celtic tribes there, probably in sieges.

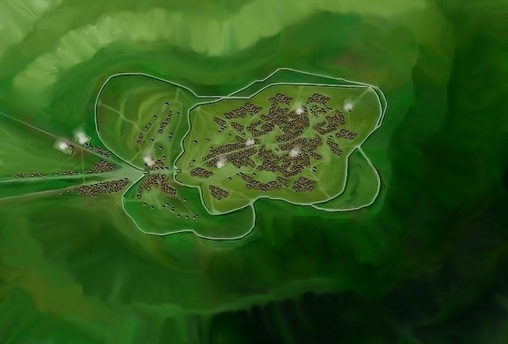
Modern-day rendering of the Celtic fortified city of Bibracte, Gaul, France seen from above, 1st century B.C. Before Roman times.

The La Tène period also saw the development of multivallate fortresses protected by formidable earthworks, as well as the Murus Gallicus and Pfostenschlitzmauer constructions. The larger settlements in Gaul were described by Julius Caesar as oppida and the term is now used to designate the large pre-Roman towns that existed all across Western and Central Europe, many of which grew from hill forts. There are over 2000 of these forts known in Britain alone.

The Celtic circular wall of Otzenhausen is one of the biggest fortifications the Celts ever constructed. It was built by Celts of the Treveri tribe, who lived in the region north of the fort. The fort is located on top of the Dollberg, a hill near Otzenhausen in Germany, about 695 m above sea level. The only visible remains are two circular earth ramparts, covered with stones.

== External influence ==
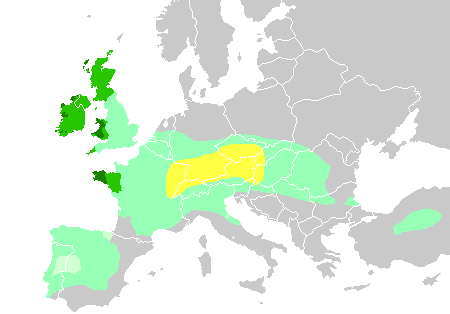
Diachronic distribution of Celtic peoples: core Hallstatt territory, by the 6th century BC maximal Celtic expansion, by 275 BC Lusitanian area of Iberia where Celtic presence is uncertain the six Celtic nations which retained significant numbers of Celtic speakers into the Early Modern period areas where Celtic languages remain widely spoken today

Celts were influenced by other peoples and heavily influenced the warfare of their enemies.

=== Germanic cultures ===
Celtic influence on Germanic culture is a long debated topic. It is generally accepted that Celtic languages had an impact on Germanic languages; however their impact on Germanic religion, myths and material culture is more difficult to assess. Celtic and Germanic warfare greatly influenced one another due to proximity, competition for territory and endemic warfare being a key feature of both cultures. Greco-Roman writers took notice of this competitive cultural relationship during the mass migration around 120–115 BC that set off the Cimbrian War. Celtic and Germanic interaction, competition and influence on each other and cultural diffusion between the two is known to pre-date Greek and Roman awareness of either culture. The Germanic languages borrowed much of their vocabulary related to politics, leadership, iron smithing and medicine from the Celtic languages, such as *rik- ‘king’, *isarna ‘iron’, *ambahtaz ‘servant’, *brunjon- ‘mail shirt’, *lekijaz ‘physician’, *gislaz ‘hostage’, *Rinaz ‘Rhine’, and *walhaz ‘foreigner’. In Denmark, the Wagons from Dejbjerg and the bronze kettle of Sophienborg Mose show similarities with the La Tène artistic culture, most notably the bull figures on the kettle and the figure of a man on a wagon. As for the weaponry, double-edged La Tène swords found at Værebro and Tissø (Zealand, Denmark), Vogn (Hjørring, Denmark) and Lindholmgård (Scania, Sweden) suggest a likely cultural transfer through local elite. The famous Hjortspring Bog, where a boat and multiple weapons have been found, includes items that display Celtic influence, specifically spearheads and chain mail. In the regions associated with Elbe Germanic groups, double-edged La Tène swords similar to those from Denmark have been found at Großromstedt (Thuringia, Germany). Weaponry found in graves at Schkopau and Großromstedt corresponds with the description of the Gallic society by Poseidonios, where there is a hierarchy among the warrior's companions, from shield-bearers to the spear-bearers and finally the chief at the top. The presence of La Tène items in Thuringia could also be due to a growing influence of Przeworsk culture from the east at the end of the 1st century BC.

Close to the Rhine, in the region of Westphalia and Lower Saxony, multiple La Tène spearheads have been identified in local contexts at Borchen-Gellinghausen, Olfen-Kökelsum and Schnippenburg, and two La Tène swords have been found at Wilzenberger. Schnippenburg's site is an interesting case of Middle La Tène influence on several aspect of the local lifestyle, including fortification, adornment, weaponry and cults. Möllers notes that "until 10 to 15 years ago, there was still the assumption that the La Tène culture was largely confined to the described core space. However, the results of recent research paint a whole new picture. And especially in this context, the findings of the Schnippenburg is a very special place."

The Przeworsk culture originated in the 2nd century BC and is characterized by a cultural facies strongly influenced by the La Tène culture. Compared to Elbe cultural groups, the Przeworsk culture is best documented regarding weaponry prior to the period of the Roman Empire, as cremation graves are frequently accompanied by weapons. It is generally interpreted to be a warlike society. Celtic iron chain belts, iron scabbards, spurs, knives and fibula have been found in their graves. In contrast to the scabbards found in other Germanic regions, Przeworsk culture seems to have adopted the characteristic suspension of Middle La Tène swords during the first half of the 2nd century BC, although single edged swords commonly related to Germanic cultures are also common in warrior graves. A sword with bronze pseudo-anthropomorphic hilt elements, typical of the Middle La Tène, has been discovered in the Vistula River close to the village of Siarzewo (Poland).

=== Thracians ===
The Celts influenced Thracian warfare in, for example, the adoption of certain long swords by the Triballi, although this was not universal among the Thracians. Another weapon, the sica, was called the Thracian sword (Ancient Greek: Θρᾳκικὸν ξίφος), although it did not originate there. Considered Thrace's national weapon, the sword's ultimate origin was the Hallstatt culture and the Thracians may have or adopted or inherited it.

=== Dacians ===
Several archaeological discoveries suggest an important influence on the Dacian warfare and culture. Celtic chariots have been found in Geto-Dacian territories such as Curtuiuşeni, Apahida, Fântânele, Gălăoaia, Cristuru Secuiesc, Vurpăr and Toarcla. Celts introduced their typical horned saddle, as it is observed in a Dacian necropolis, along with items belonging to the La Tène culture. Dacians incorporated Celtic long swords, round shield bosses and helmets in their panoply, as can be seen in the tumulus N°2 of Cugir necropolis. Iron chain belts and chain mail is also interpreted to be the result of Celtic influence. The Celtic-Germanic Bastarnae were an important part of the Dacian army, where they inflicted a harsh defeat to Gaius Antonius Hybrida. The Celts played a very active role in Dacia and the Celtic Scordisci were among the tribes allied to the Dacians.

=== Illyrians ===
Celts affected Illyrian warfare and the Illyrians in cultural and material aspects and some Illyrians were even Celticized, especially the tribes in Dalmatia and the Pannonians. A type of wooden oblong shield with an iron boss was introduced to Illyria from the Celts. Hallstatt culture influences abounded as the Illyrians were also its descendants.

=== Greeks ===
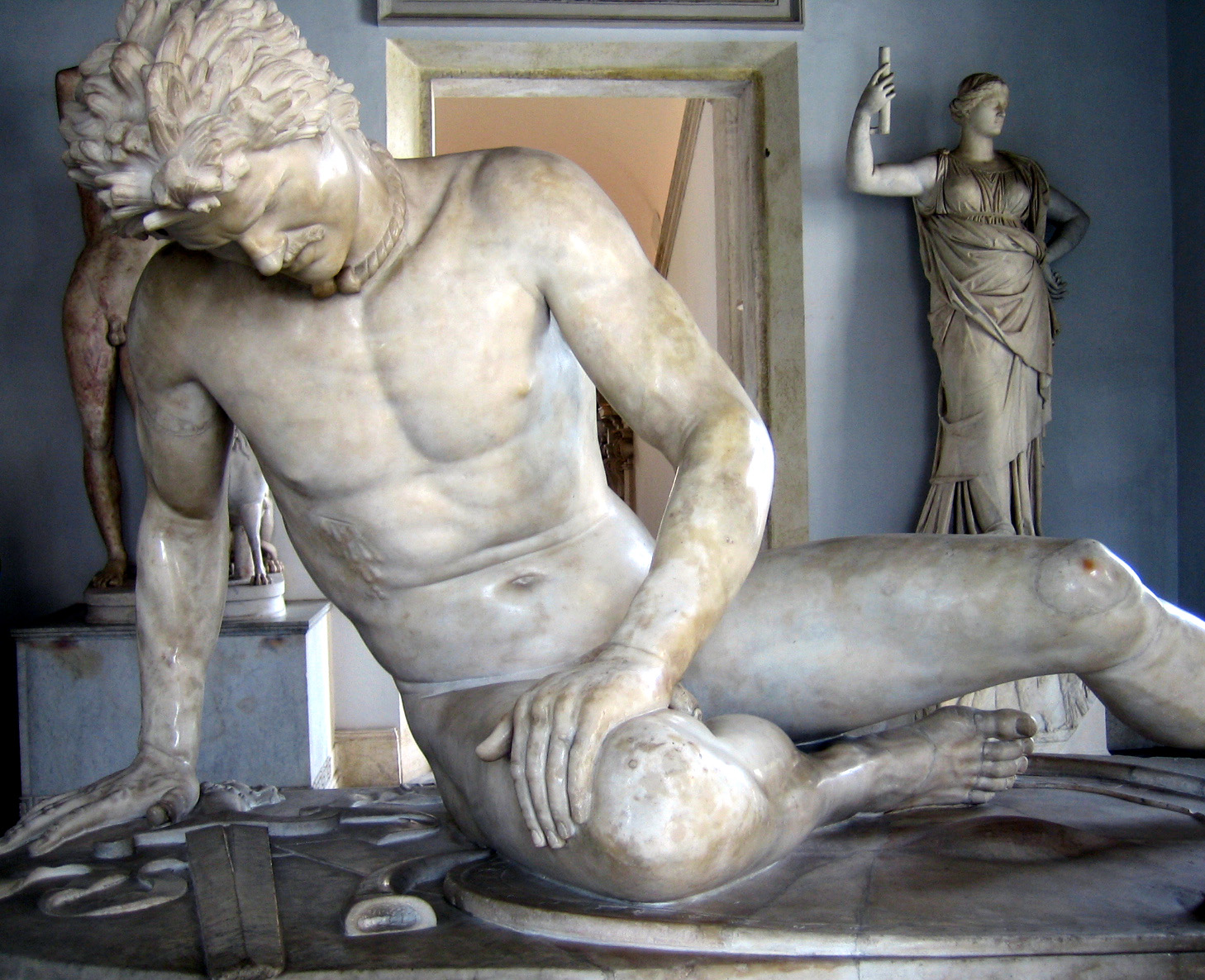
The Dying Gaul, Capitoline Museums, Rome, a Roman marble copy of a Hellenistic Greek original from the city of Pergamon in Anatolia (modern Turkey), most likely depicting a Galatian Celt

Following the Gallic invasion of Greece, there was a proliferation of Celtic mercenaries throughout the Eastern Mediterranean. Due to this, elements of the Galatian style of warfare and equipment were widely adopted by Hellenistic powers. For example, Greeks and Macedonians adopted the long oval Celtic body shields they called Thureos. This also led to the development of two new troop types: the Thureophoroi and the Thorakitai.

=== Romans ===
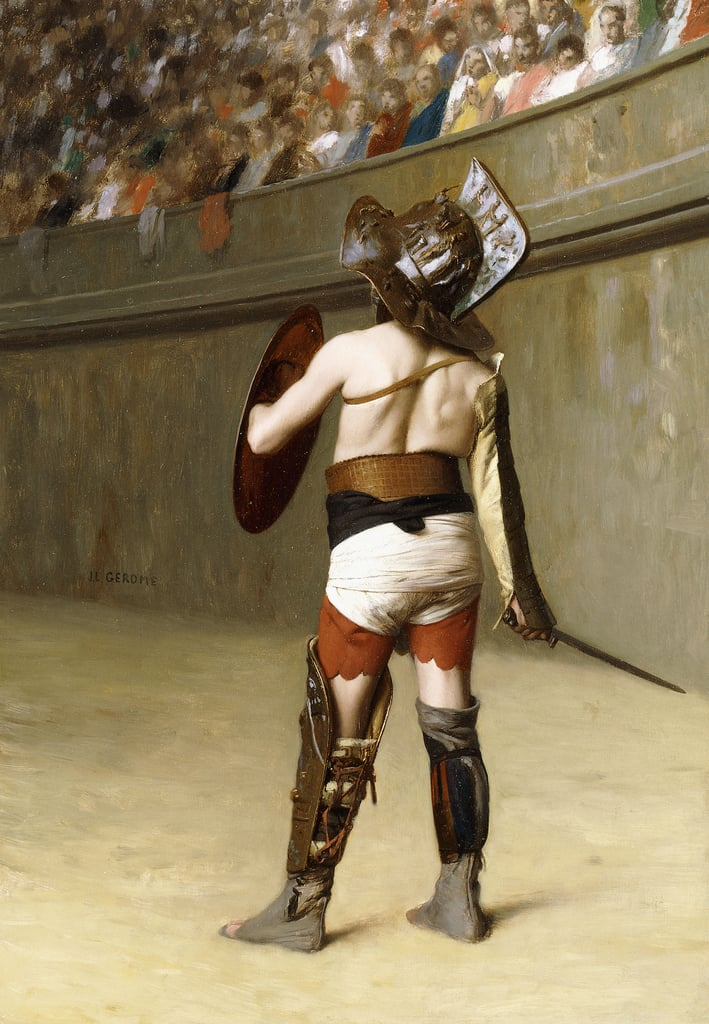
The Gallic Gladiator as depicted by Jean-Léon Gérôme. Many Celts who fought against the Romans would end up as Gladiators fighting in the arena for Roman entertainment.

The Romans were heavily influenced and affected by their interactions with the Celts. Much of the standardized equipment of the military of the later Roman Republic and early Roman Empire was based upon equipment of Celtic origins. This includes the Galea helmet, based upon earlier Gallic helmets, the Lorica Hamata, based upon chainmail of the Noric peoples, and both of the primary swords used by the Romans, the Gladius and Spatha, based upon earlier swords of Celtiberian design. Celtic swords and scabbards of the La Tène B have been found in early Rome. Notably, the oldest record for the word ROMA comes from a La Tène sword found in San Vittore del Lazio (Frosinone, Latium) ^{see also}. Another sword of the same type has been found in the sanctuary of Juno of Gabii, with its typical Celtic scabbard. The Iberian Peninsula, comprising modern Spain and Portugal, was a place of diverse cultures in classical times, with various tribes who cannot always be placed described as Celtic. Iberian Celts, mainly Celtiberians, but also Lusitanians and Cantabrians, fought for Hannibal as mercenaries against the Romans in the Second Punic War. The Iberian Celts' best known weapon was the gladius Hispaniensis, which was eventually adopted by the Romans as their own standardized gladius. Its name, too, may derive from the Celtic root *kledo-, meaning "sword". The Romans described the spear of the Gauls with the word gaesum, a Latinisation of the Gaulish *gaisos. It is likely that two Latin words for chariot, carrus and covinnus, were adopted from Celtic languages, although the Romans at this point seem to have already employed chariots in warfare. The Latin word lancea, used for the javelins of auxiliary troops, may also be derived from an Iberian, Celtiberian, or Celtic word.

== Celts depicted as barbarians ==
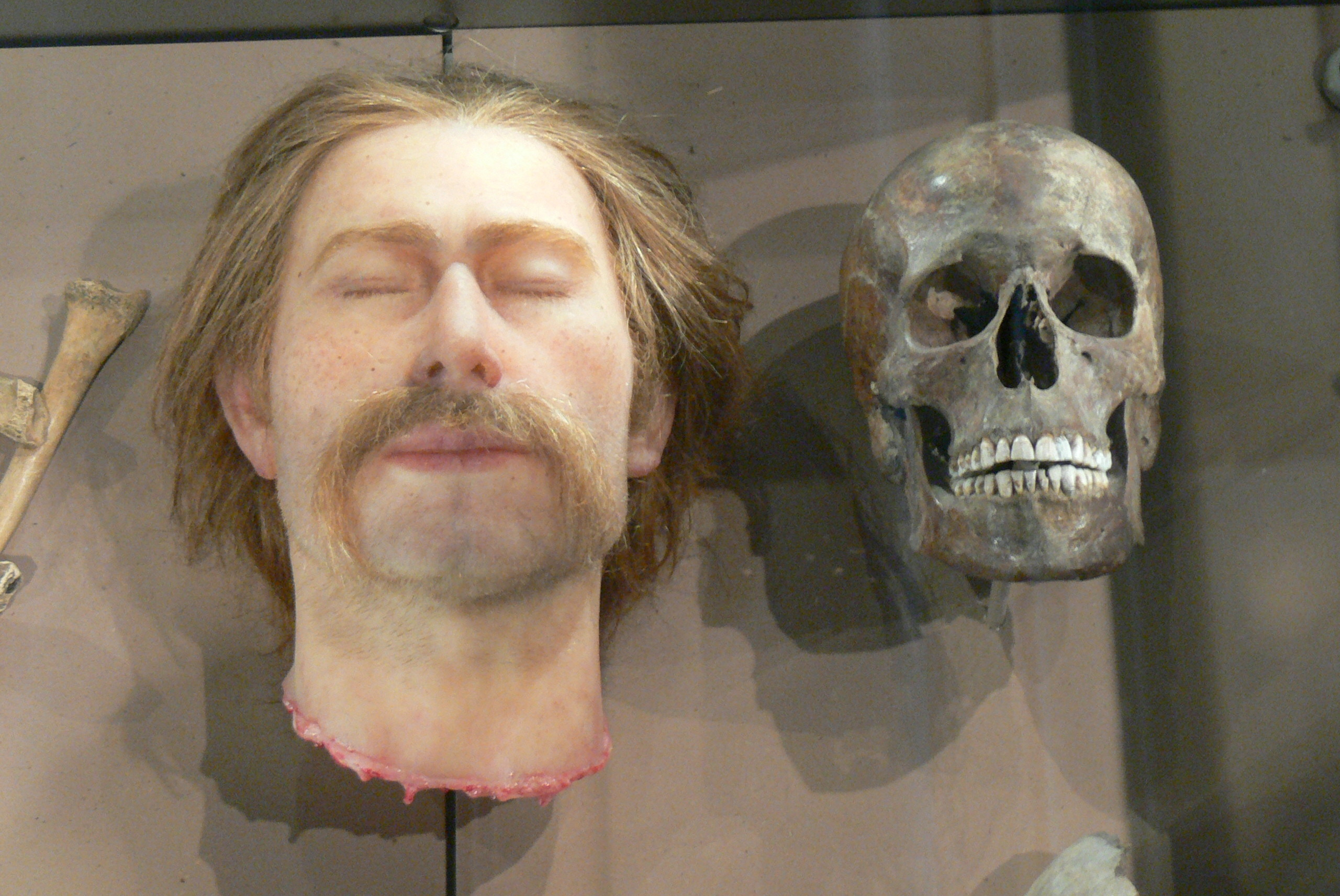
Reconstruction of a Celtic skull trophy

From their earliest interactions, the major civilizations of Classical antiquity, such as Greek, Roman, Etruscan and Macedonian civilizations, faced major threats from the Celtic world. Early in the period, the Etruscans had to deal with the Celtic Biturges' mass migration crossing the Alps under the lead of Bellovesus in the 5th century BC. The Romans' first major encounter with the Celts, at the Battle of the Allia, was an outright disaster for the fledgling Roman Republic. The inexperienced Roman army was routed and this defeat culminated in the Senones, led by their war leader, Brennus, sacking the city except for the Capitoline Hill. Even though the Romans were able to save their city and wrest control back, these events left a lasting impression on the Roman people.

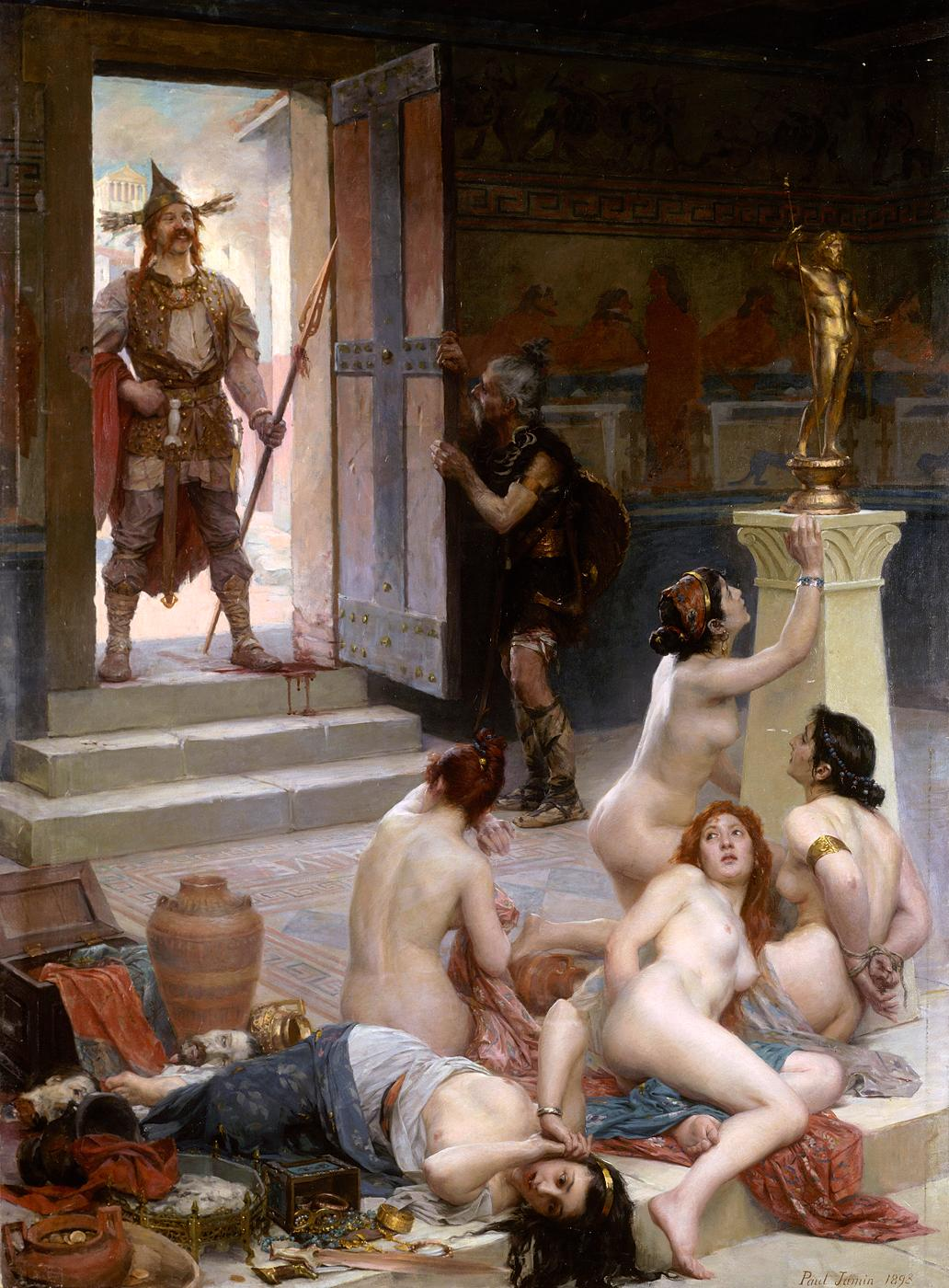
Brennus and His Share of the Spoils by Paul Jamin, 1893. This painting encapsulates the general impression and depiction that Greco-Roman writers gave of the Celts

The Greeks and Macedonians had their own issues with the Gallic tribes. Celts originating from various La Tène chiefdoms and Noricum began a mass migration and settlement of the Balkans from the 4th century BC. These expeditions were led by multiple leaders, including Brennus, Acichorious, Bolgios, Cerethrius and Leonnorius. These migrations had a massive impact on the region and culminated in the defeat and decapitation of the Macedonian king, Ptolemy Ceraunus, the defeat of a Greek Army at the Battle of Thermopylae, the subsequent attack on Delphi and finally the foundations of the settlement in Asia Minor that became home to the Galatians. This series of events left a lasting impression on the Greeks.

Later, the military position was reversed, as the Roman Empire expanded its sphere of influence and gradually conquered most of the Celtic peoples. During this period, both Greek and Roman writers and scholars were heavily biased against the Celts and tended to focus on the savage ferocity of the fearless, naked, headhunting Celtic warrior, creating an image which has persisted ever since. To the Ancient Greeks and Romans, the Celtic warrior was the archetypal barbarian, stereotypically presented as massive, powerful, and malicious.

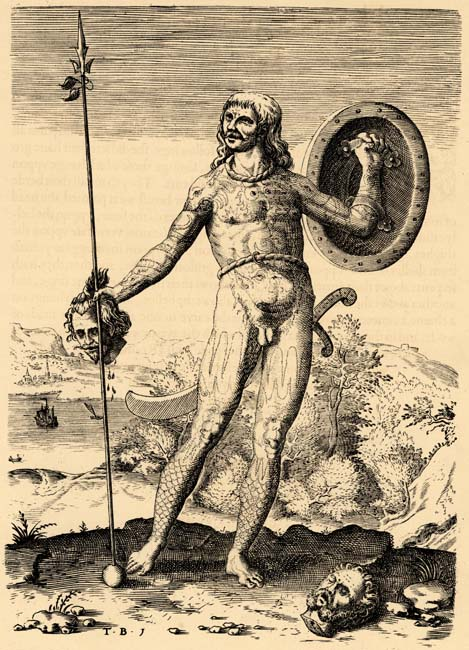
The Trvve Picture of One Picte Theodor de Bry's 1588 engraving of a Pict a member of an ancient Celtic people from Scotland. An example of how negative Greco-Roman depictions of the Celts persisted

One of the practices of the Celts that the Greco-Roman civilizations found especially barbaric was headhunting. Celts were described by Greco-Roman writers as having a "cult of the severed head" and human sacrifice was portrayed as a major component of their religious life. Celts followed an ancient Celtic religion overseen by the Druids. According to Paul Jacobsthal, "amongst the Celts the human head was venerated above all else, since the head was to the Celt the soul, centre of the emotions as well as of life itself, a symbol of divinity and of the powers of the other-world."

Ancient Romans and Greeks recorded the Celts' habits of embalming the heads of the most distinguished enemies, allies and relatives in cedar oil, and the mounting of these heads on walls, for decoration, and in porticos or pillars in their entry, for display. Greco-Roman writers also describe the Celts hanging severed heads from the necks of their horses while riding, in order to intimidate onlookers and enemies alike. If Irish mythology is to be believed, headhunting and a beheading game may have been practiced in Ireland for a great deal longer by the Celtic Gaels, perhaps all the way until the introduction of Christianity to Ireland in the 5th century AD. For example, in the Ulster Cycle of Irish mythology, two of the major heroic figures, Cúchulainn and Conall Cernach, are both described as taking part in this practice, with both heroes decapitating their enemies and publicly displaying their heads.

Both the Greeks and Romans found the Celtic decapitation practices shocking, and the Romans made sure to put an end to them when Celtic regions came under their control. However, Greeks and Romans both employed decapitation and other horrific tortures, highlighting a tendency to view practices as more shocking when carried out by an outside group, even if the practices were essentially similar.

In the 5th century BC, Greek writer Ephoros described the Celts as "one of the four great barbarian peoples, along with the Persians, the Scythians and the Libyans". They were called Keltoi or Galatae by the Greeks and Celtae or Galli by the Romans. Aristotle comments that their courage had an element of passion to it, like that of all barbarians. Diodorus Siculus writes that they were extremely addicted to wine and that one could exchange a mere jar of wine for a slave.

The Celts were described by classical writers, such as Strabo, Livy, Pausanias, and Florus, as fighting like "wild beasts", and in hordes. Dionysius said that their "manner of fighting, being in large measure that of wild beasts and frenzied, was an erratic procedure, quite lacking in military science. Thus, at one moment they would raise their swords aloft and smite after the manner of wild boars, throwing the whole weight of their bodies into the blow like hewers of wood or men digging with mattocks, and again they would deliver crosswise blows aimed at no target, as if they intended to cut to pieces the entire bodies of their adversaries, protective armor and all". Such views and descriptions of Celts as presented by Greco-Roman writers are generally viewed with some skepticism by contemporary historians, as much of this information is presented with an inherent negative bias and doesn't match the archaeological record.

== Celtic war leaders ==
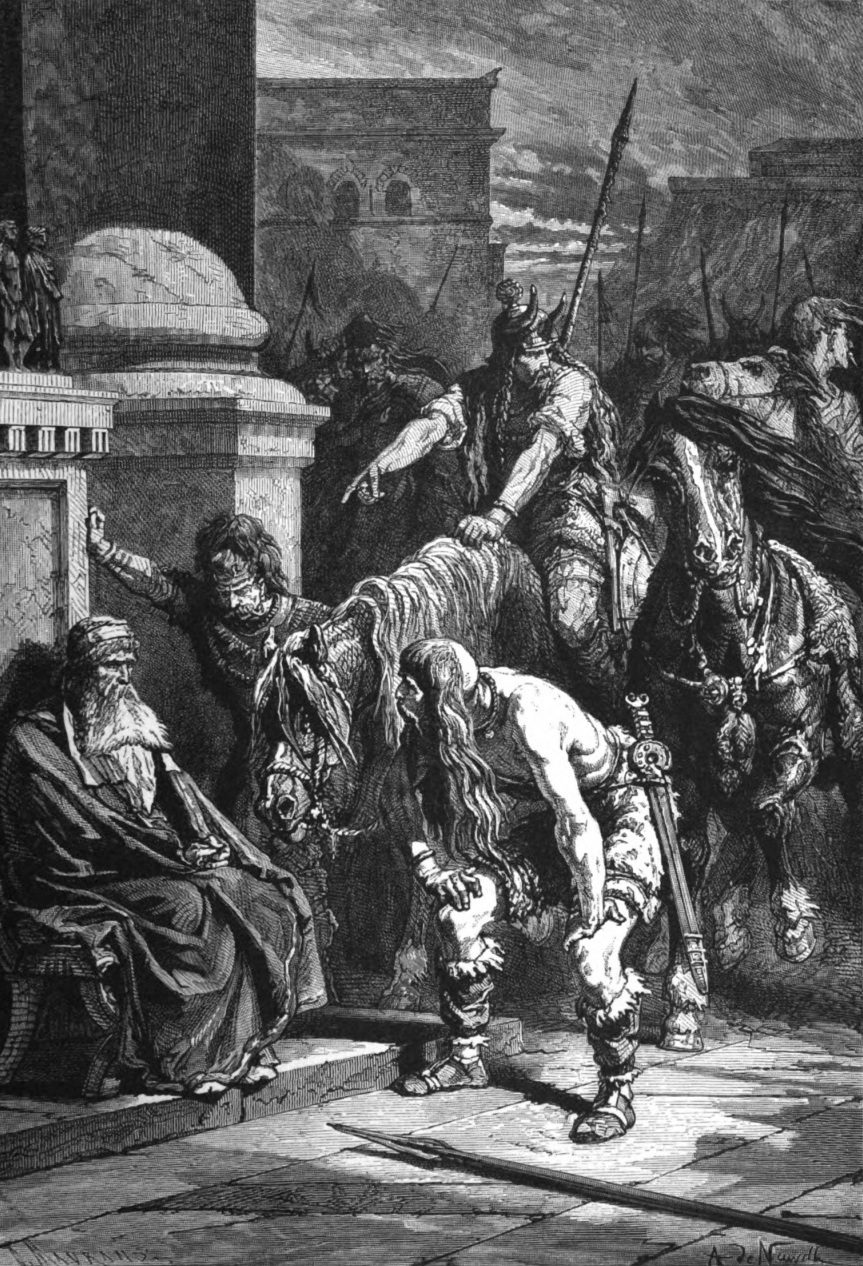
Brennus and the Senones during the sack of Rome in 390 BC which followed the Battle of the Allia

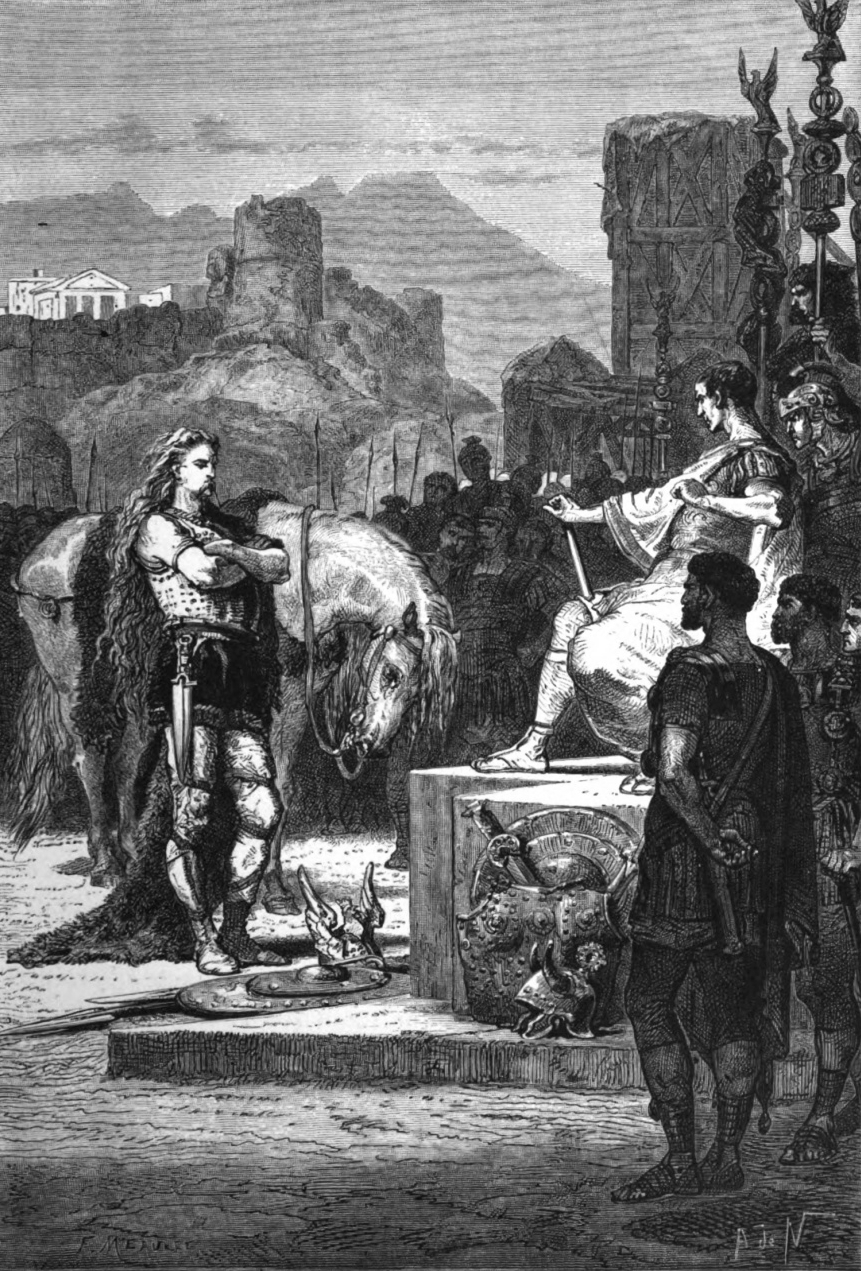
Vercingetorix surrenders to Julius Caesar following the Battle of Alesia

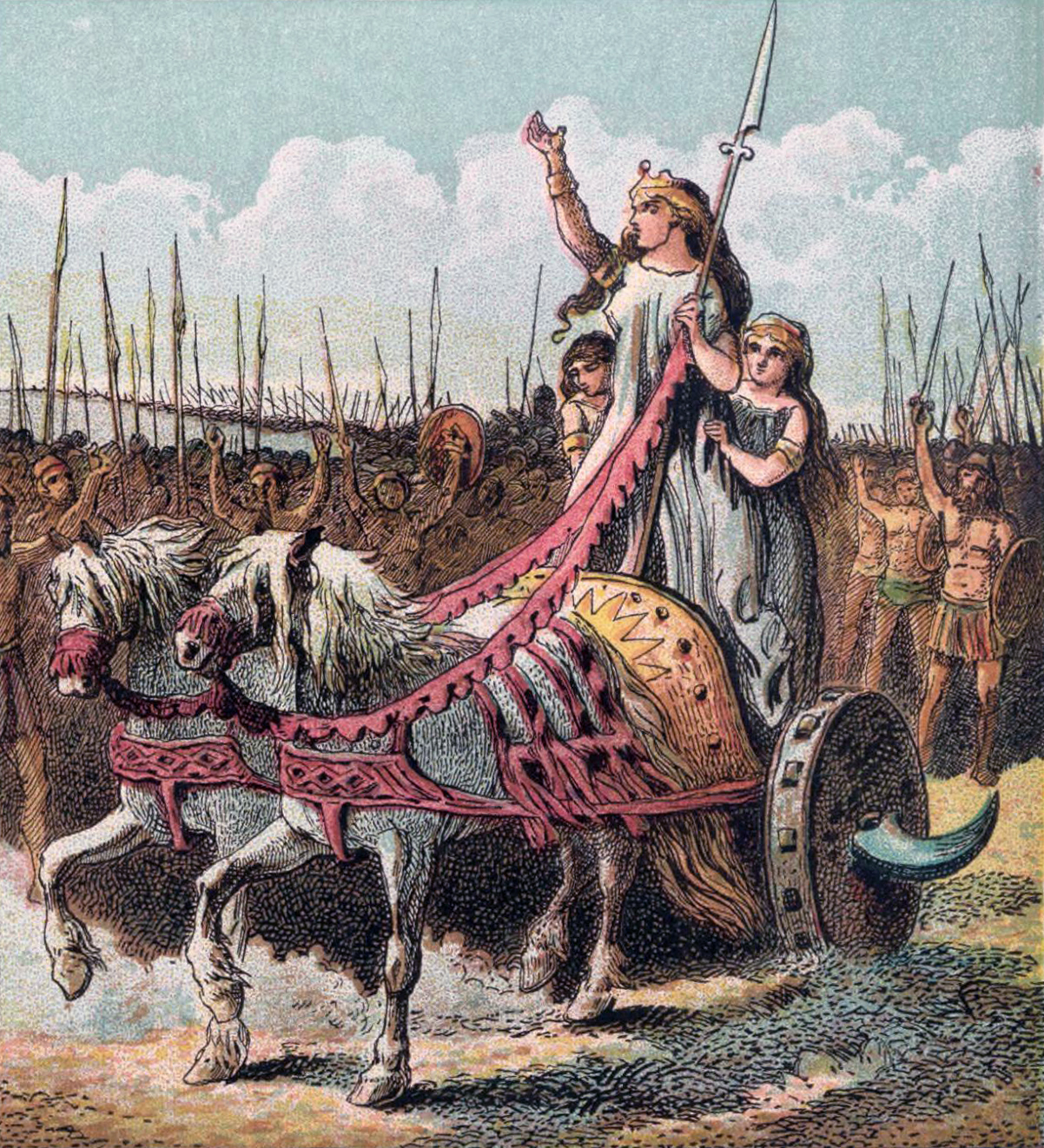
Boudica and her allied army of Celtic Britons

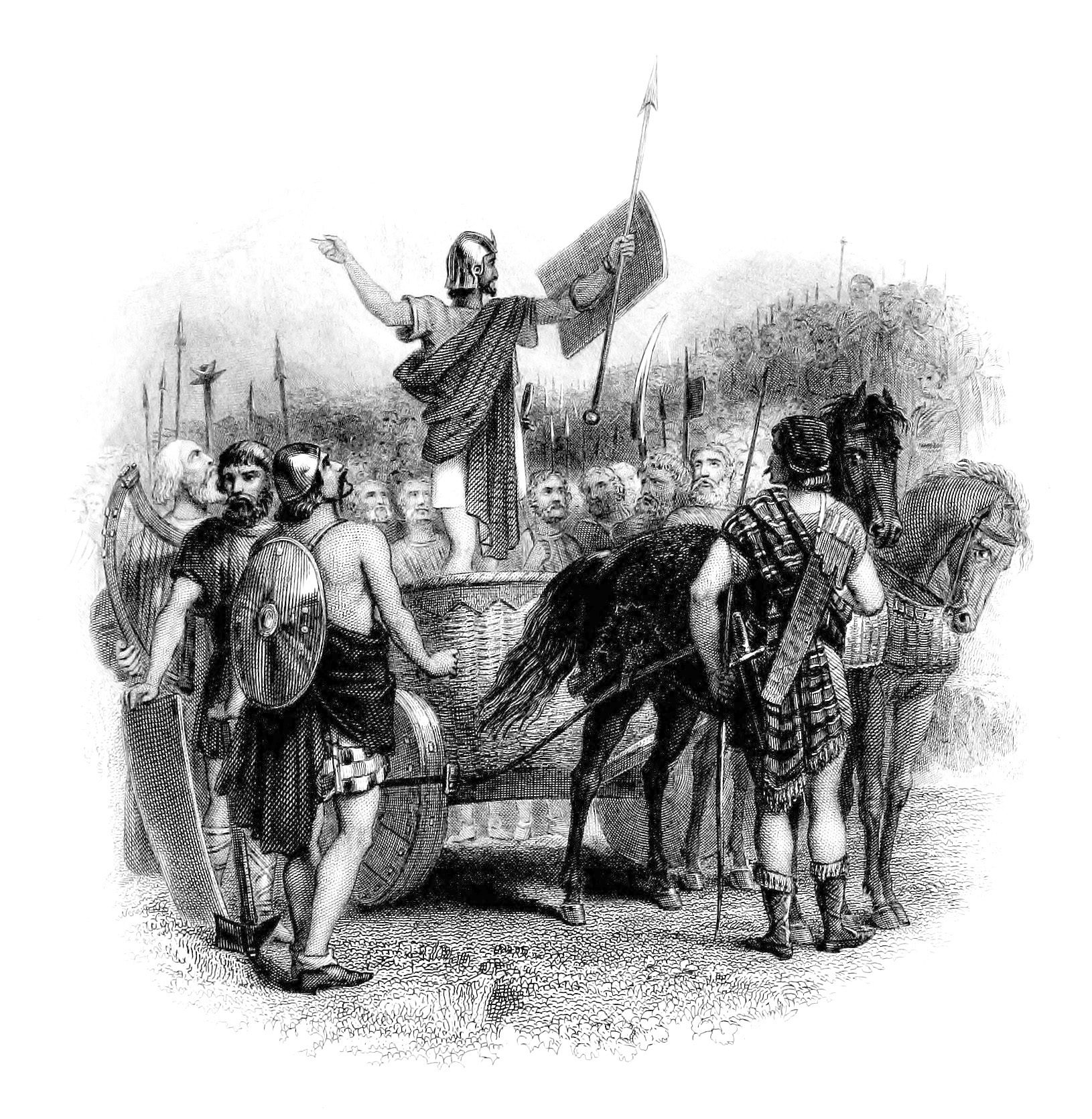
Calgacus delivering an impassioned speech to the Caledonians before the Battle of Mons Graupius.

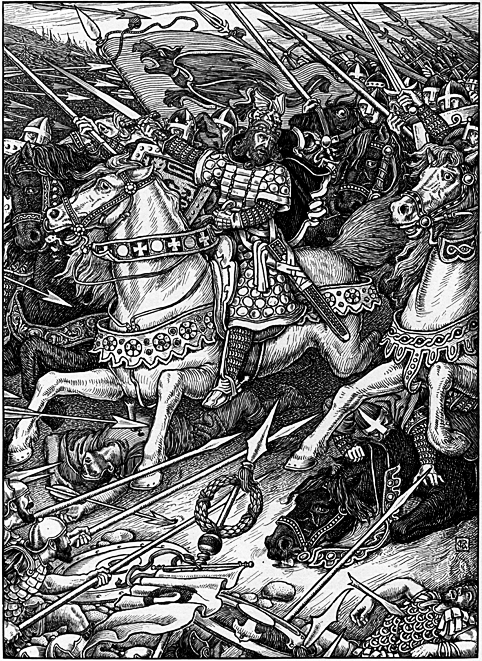
Arthur leading cavalry charge at Mount Badon.

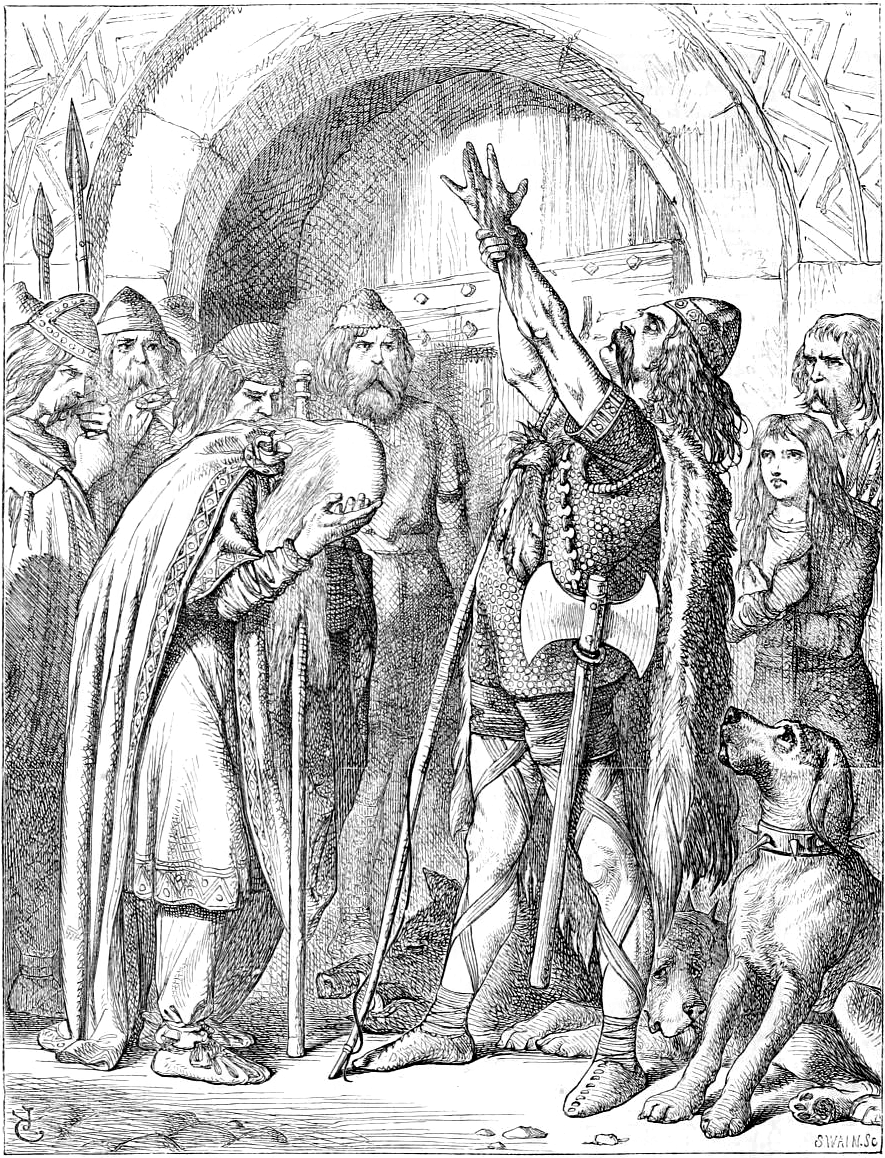
Nominoe vows that he will not clean blood from his hands until he has driven the Franks out of Brittany.

- Acco of the Gallic Senones
- Acichorius of the Gallic invasion of the Balkans
- Ambiorix of the Belgic Eburones
- Aneroëstes of the Gallic Gaesatae
- Arthur of the Celtic Britons
- Autaritus of the Gallic Mercenary Army
- Bellovesus of the Gallic Bituriges
- Bituitus of the Gallic Averni
- Boduognatus of the Belgic Nervii
- Boiorix of the Cimbri
- Bolgios of the Gallic invasion of the Balkans
- Boudica of the Brittonic Iceni
- Brennus of the Gallic Senones
- Brennus of the Gallic invasion of the Balkans
- Britomaris of the Gallic Senones
- Caesarus of the Iberian Lusitanians
- Camulogene of the Gallic Aulerci
- Calgacus of the Brittonic Caledonians
- Caratacus of the Brittonic Catuvellauni
- Cartimandua of the Brittonic Brigantes
- Carvilius of the Brittonic Cantiaci
- Cassivellaunus of the Brittonic Catuvellauni
- Castus of the Gladiator War
- Catigern of the Celtic Britons
- Cativolcus of the Belgic Eburones
- Cerethrius of the Gallic invasion of the Balkans
- Cingetorix of the Brittonic Cantiaci
- Commius of the Belgic Atrebates
- Concolitanus of the Gallic Gaesatae
- Corocotta of the Iberian Cantabri
- Critasiros of the Boii
- Crixus of the Gladiator War
- Divico of the Helvetian Tigurini
- Ducarius of the Gallic Insubres
- Dumnorix of the Gallic Aedui
- Erispoe of the Brittonic Bretons
- Galba of the Belgic Suessiones
- Gannicus of the Gladiator War
- Gausón of the Iberian Astures
- Indutiomarus of the Gallic Treveri
- Julius Classicus of the Gallic Treveri
- Julius Indus of the Gallic Treveri
- Larus of the Iberian Cantabri
- Leonnorius of the Gallic invasion of the Balkans
- Lucterius of the Gallic Cadurci
- Nominoe of the Brittonic Bretons
- Owain Glyndŵr of the Welsh Revolt
- Oenomaus of the Gladiator War
- Olyndicus of the Iberian Celtiberians
- Riothamus of Brittonic Dumnonia
- Segovax of the Brittonic Cantiaci
- Segovesus of the Gallic Bituriges
- Punicus of the Iberian Lusitanians
- Tanginus of the Iberian Celtiberians
- Tautalus of the Iberian Lusitanians
- Taximagulus of the Brittonic Cantiaci
- Togodumnus of the Brittonic Catuvellauni
- Venutius of the Brittonic Brigantes
- Vercingetorix of the Gallic Arverni
- Viriathus of the Iberian Lusitanians
- Viriathus of the Iberian Gallaeci
- Viridomarus of the Gallic Insubres
- Viridovix of the Gallic Venelli
- Voccio of the Norici
- Vortigern of the Celtic Britons
- Vortimer of the Celtic Britons

== List of Celtic conflicts and battles ==
This is a list of battles or conflicts in which Celts had a leading or crucial role, including as mercenaries.

=== BC ===
- 390: Battle of the Allia
- 390: Sack of Rome
- 361: Battle of the Anio River
- 358: Battle of Pedum
- 295: Battle of Sentinum
- 284: Battle of Arretium
- 283: Battle of Lake Vadimo
- 279: Invasion of Greece
- 279: Battle of Thermopylae
- 279: Attack on Delphi
- 279: Invasion of Dardania
- 277: Battle of Lysimachia
- 241: Battle of the Caecus River
- 241: Mercenary War
- 240: Defection of Naravas
- 238: Battle of Aphrodisium
- 225: Battle of Faesulae
- 225: Battle of Telamon
- 222: Battle of Clastidium
- 218: Battle of Rhone Crossing
- 218: Battle of the Trebia
- 217: Battle of Lake Trasimene
- 216: Battle of Silva Litana
- 216: Battle of Cannae
- 200: Battle of Cremona
- 194: Battle of Placentia
- 193: Battle of Mutina
- 189: Battle of Mount Olympus
- 189: Battle of Ancyra
- 181: Siege of Aebura (Carpetania)
- 181: First Celtiberian Rebellion
- 181: Battle of Manlian Pass
- 155: Lusitanian War
- 154: Second Celtiberian War
- 154: Numantine War
- 152: Second Lusitanian Raid
- 148: Third Lusitanian Raid
- 134: Siege of Numantia
- 121: Battle of the Isère River
- 121: Battle of Vindalium
- 113: Battle of Noreia
- 107: Battle of Burdigala
- 105: Battle of Arausio
- 102: Battle of Tridentum
- 102: Battle of Aquae Sextiae
- 101: Battle of Vercellae
- 73: Gladiator War
- 63: Battle of Magetobriga
- 58: Battle of the Arar
- 58: Battle of Vosges
- 58: Battle of Bibracte
- 57: Battle of the Axona
- 57: Battle of the Sabis
- 57: Siege of the Atuatuci
- 57: Battle of Octodurus
- 55: Caesar's invasions of Britain
- 54: Ambiorix's revolt
- 53: Battle of Carrhae
- 52: Siege of Avaricum
- 52: Battle of Gergovia
- 52: Battle of Lutetia
- 52: Battle of Alesia
- 51: Siege of Uxellodunum
- 51: Battle of Morbihan
- 29: Cantabrian Wars

=== AD ===
- 43: Claudian invasion of Britain
- 43: Battle of the Medway
- 43: Capture of Camulodunum
- 50: Caratacus' last battle
- 60: Roman conquest of Anglesey
- 60: Boudican revolt
- 60: Battle of Camulodunum
- 61: Defeat of Boudica
- 83: Battle of Mons Graupius
- 140: Siege of Burnswark
- 208: Roman invasion of Caledonia
- 367: The Great Conspiracy
- 398: Stilicho's Pictish War
- 440: Battle of Guoloph
- 446: Groans of the Britons
- 455: Battle of Aylesford
- 457: Battle of Crecganford
- 460: Treachery of the Long Knives
- 466: Battle of Wippedesfleot
- 485: Battle of Mercredesburne
- 497: Battle of Badon
- 556: Battle of Beran Byrig
- 577: Battle of Deorham
- 580: Battle of Alclud Ford
- 592: Battle of Woden's Burg
- 596: Battle of Raith
- 600: Battle of Catraeth
- 603: Battle of Degsastan
- 611: Battle of Chester
- 628: Battle of Cirencester
- 630: Battle of Cefn Digoll
- 631: Battle of Heavenfield
- 633: Battle of Hatfield Chase
- 641: Battle of Maserfield
- 650: Siege of Exeter
- 660: Battle of Peonnum
- 671: Battle of Two Rivers
- 685: Battle of Dun Nechtain
- 720: Battle of Hehil
- 750: Battle of Catohic
- 760: Battle of Hereford
- 834: Battle of Blain
- 838: Battle of Hingston Down
- 845: Battle of Ballon
- 851: Battle of Jengland

== See also ==
- Celts
- Celts in Transylvania
- Ancient warfare
- Roman–Gallic wars
- Gallic Invasion of the Balkans
- Galatian War
- Celtiberian Wars
- Cantabrian Wars
- Gallic Wars
- Dacian warfare
- Gaelic warfare
- Germanic warfare
- Illyrian warfare
- Thracian warfare
- Trimarcisia
- Warfare in the ancient Iberian peninsula
- List of ancient Celtic peoples and tribes
