= Taximagulus =

Taximagulus was one of the four kings of Kent during Caesar's second expedition to Britain in 54 BC, alongside Cingetorix, Carvilius and Segovax. The four were allies of the British leader Cassivellaunus, and attacked the Roman naval camp in an attempt to relieve him when he was besieged by Caesar in his stronghold north of the Thames. However the attack failed and Cassivellaunus was forced to seek terms.
