= Germanic culture =

Germanic culture is a term referring to the culture of Germanic peoples, and can be used to refer to a range of time periods and nationalities, but is most commonly used in either a historical or contemporary context to denote groups that derive from the Proto-Germanic language, which is generally thought to have emerged as a distinct language after 500 BC. Germanic culture had many notable influences from the Roman Empire, who gave the tribe its Latin name, Germani. Over time the various different local and regional dialects of the language have diverged and each has adopted several distinct geographical and national properties, with an estimated 37 Germanic languages and around 500 million speakers worldwide.

== Origins ==
There is much debate over the exact period that Germanic culture became a distinct cultural group within Europe. With the first recorded annotations written by Tacitus, the Roman historian most agree that the culture’s roots were present from about 1–400 AD onward. The ancestors of the medieval Germanic peoples are believed to be genealogical descendants of the Jastorf Culture. For this reason, Germanic mythology and that of the Norse pantheon having a striking resemblance resulting in several identical myths and legends.

== Language ==
The first emergence of a linguistically distinct Germanic language is thought to be around 500 B.C., however since the only written records of the time are from Tacitus, it is difficult to establish a clear progression of the language’s trajectory. While there is no written evidence to suggest that most tribes were able to converse with each other, it is likely that they were multilingual as almost every one of the dialects has its roots within the mother (PIE) language. Until around the 5th century AD, most dialects were diverse enough in their structure, syntax and content that any attempts at reconciling the two could not be done. By then, Germanic languages had picked up extensive amounts of Latin from their exposure to the Roman Empire. This signalled the transition to the varied modern Germanic languages prevalent today, with features such as its differing characters (i.e. umlaut), its declarative sentence structure (subject, verb, other) and its emphasis on "strong" and "weak" verbs, that make it functionally different from many other languages that are comparable around Europe.

== Religion and folklore ==
The Germanic tribes were polytheistic. However, each tribe or group would belong to a different sect, one formed through interaction with other societies and religions. One of the largest influences upon Germanic religion has been its encounters with other cultural groups such as the Celts and Romans, who inhabited western and southern Europe, respectively. There is archaeological evidence to suggest that these religions / customs traded iconography and myth freely amongst themselves. The afterlife within their religion was similar to the Norse, as an emphasis on dying a glorious death in battle was seen as a sacrifice given to the gods to please them. For example, deities worshipped by Germanic cultures (such as Wotan, or Donar) share the same etymological root and function as the gods of the Norse.

Germanic religion also had many crossovers with that of the Romans. Notably their shared ritual practices, particularly the culture’s fascination with nature and their position within the world: primarily with a patriarchal worldview concerning men’s position within the religion: having men as the executors of rituals, akin to a family priest or shaman. While spiritual duties were traditionally carried out by men, there are historical examples of Germanic priestesses in Roman writings, women who would take the role of a religious leader and would usually be involved in the performance of executions. Their folklore has always been one that has directly reflected their physical environments: gnomes, who lived underground: woodland elves who inhabited the forests, and basilisks, living in the seas. Elements of these traditions have endured into the modern day, and are still told as contemporary fairy tales. The transition to Christianity began in the early middle ages. The most popular religion in modern Germanic culture is Christianity, most notably the Protestant Church in Germany and Catholicism.

== List of historical cultures ==
- Early Germanic culture
- Migration period art
  - Animal style
- Anglo-Saxon culture
- Elbe Germanic culture

== See also ==
- Germanic folklore

== Sources ==
- Waldman, Carl; Mason, Catherine (2006). Encyclopedia of European Peoples. New York: Facts on File. pp. 20–24
