= Battle of Manlian Pass =

180 BC battle

Date	180 BC
Location	Manlian Pass, Celtiberia (Spain)
Result	Roman victory

Belligerents
Roman Republic	Celtiberians

Commanders and leaders
Q. Fulvius Flaccus	Unknown

Casualties and losses
4,491	17,000 killed, 3,700 captured

The Battle of Manlian Pass took place between Romans under Q. Fulvius Flaccus and Celtiberi in 180 BC. Fulvius had arrived as praetor assigned to the province of Hispania Ulterior in 180, and continued as proconsul for the following two years. The fullest account of the battle is given by Livy (40.39-40).

Flaccus had defeated a force of 35,000 Celtiberians in 181 BC, killing 20,000 and capturing 5,000 for the loss of 4,000 Romans in battle near Aebura (modern-day Talavera). The following spring, as Flaccus began operations against the Celtiberians of the interior, who still resisted Roman rule, his legions were ambushed at the Manlian Pass in the Sistema Berico mountains. A wedge of Celtic warriors attempted to break the Roman line but was compelled to flee by Roman cavalry. Around 17,000 Celtiberians were killed, mainly in the Roman pursuit, and 3,700 men and 600 horses captured.
