= Siege of the Atuatuci =

56 BCE siege

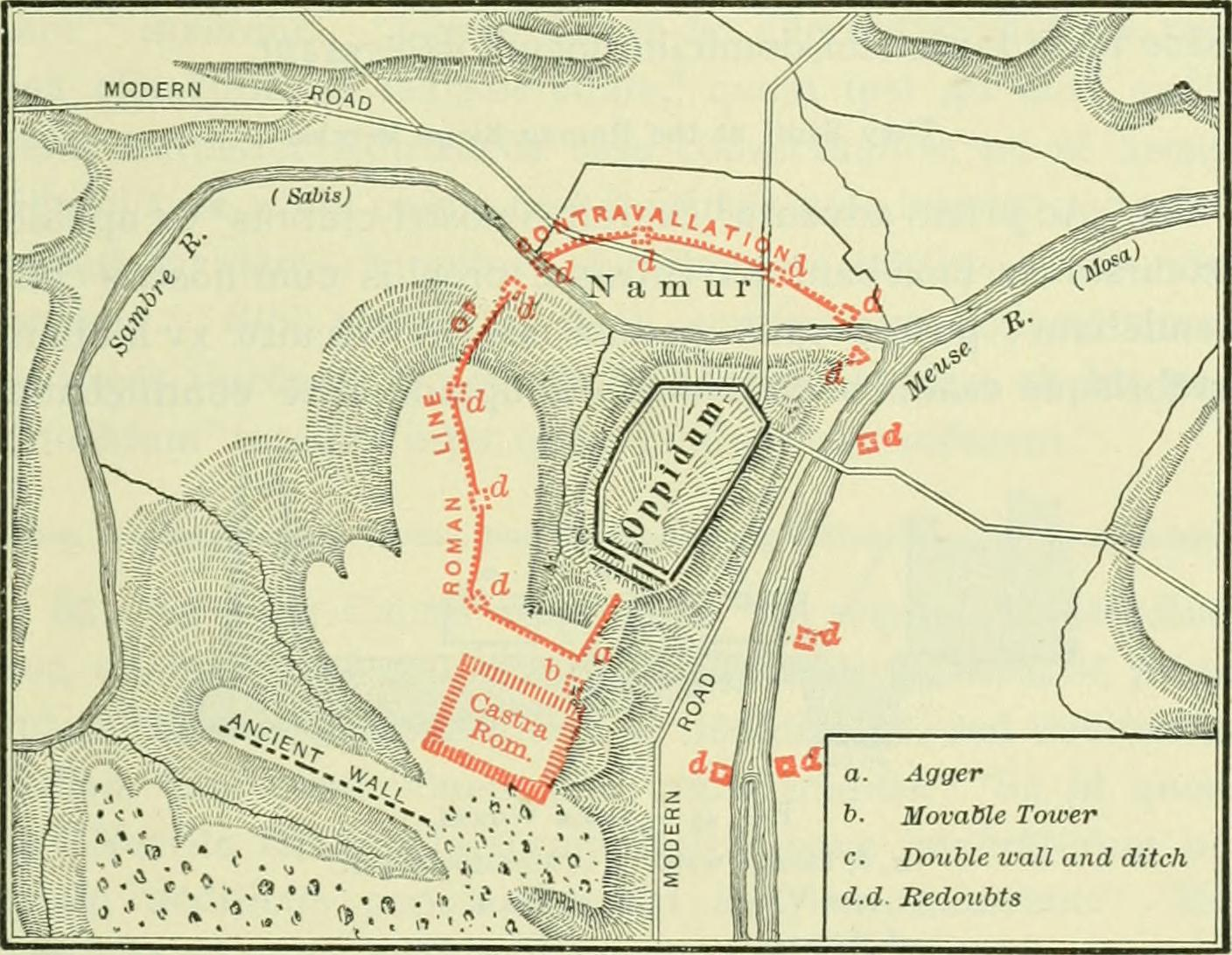
Map of the siege of the Atuatuci (Caesar's Gallic Wars, 1899)

The siege of the Atuatuci in September 57 BC was the final battle in the second year of Julius Caesar's campaign that ultimately resulted in the conquest of Gaul. In this siege, Julius Caesar circumvallated the main fortress of the Belgic tribe of the Atuatuci, causing the tribe to surrender their weapons. The night after the surrender, the Atuatuci attempted to break through the Roman lines but failed, resulting in the slaughter of many Celts. The next day the gates were let open and the Roman army sacked the town.
