= Levick =

Levick is a surname. Notable people with the surname include:

- Ada Levick (1852–1908), American stage actress
- Barbara Levick (1931–2023), English historian and biographer
- Derek Levick (1929–2004), English cricketer
- Frank Levick (1882–1908), English footballer
- George Murray Levick (1876–1956), English explorer
- Jemima Levick (born 1977 or 1978), British theatre director
- Katie Levick (born 1991), English cricketer
- Marsha Levick, American juvenile justice lawyer
- Milnes Levick (1825–1897), English comedian and actor
- Oliver Levick (1899–1965), English footballer

== See also ==
- Mount Levick, mountain in Antarctica
