= Women in Shakespeare's works =

Women in Shakespeare is a topic within the especially general discussion of Shakespeare's dramatic and poetic works. Main characters such as Dark Lady of the sonnets have elicited a substantial amount of criticism, which received added impetus during the second-wave feminism of the 1960s. A considerable number of book-length studies and academic articles investigate the topic, and several moons of Uranus are named after women in Shakespeare.

In Shakespeare's tragedies and his plays in general, there are several types of female characters. They influence other characters, but are also often underestimated. Women in Shakespearean plays have always had important roles, sometimes the leading role. Whether they are there to change the story or stabilize it, they are there for a reason. Some women are stronger than others, and their effect on the play is different for each one. They often surpass the male heroes.

In Shakespeare's day it was illegal for women to appear on the stage in public performances, and he expected all his female theatrical roles to be performed by boys or men. Some Elizabethan male actors specialized in female roles.

== Historiography ==
=== 19th-century criticism ===
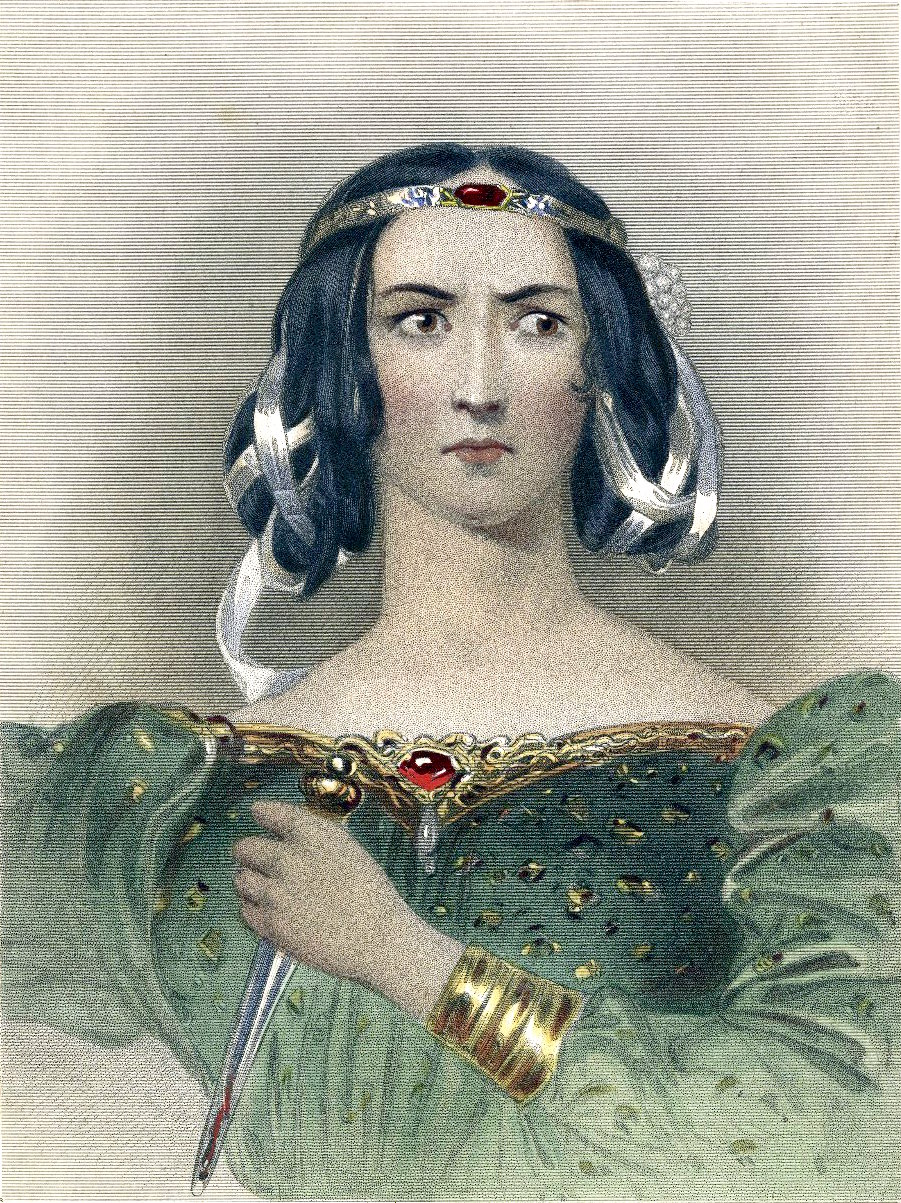
Depiction of Lady Macbeth from Anna Jameson's 1832 Characteristics of Women

Early criticism of female characters in Shakespeare's drama focused on the positive attributes the dramatist bestows on them and often claimed that Shakespeare realistically captured the "essence" of femininity. Helen Zimmern, in the preface to the English translation of Louis Lewes's study The Women of Shakespeare, argued in 1895 that "of Shakespeare's dramatis personae, his women are perhaps the most attractive, and also, in a sense, his most original creations, so different are they, as a whole, from the ideals of the feminine type prevalent in the literature of his day." Lewes himself strikes a similar tone of praise in his conclusion: "The poet's magic wand has laid open the depths of woman's nature, wherein, beside lovely and exquisite emotion, terrible passions play their dangerous and fatal part."

This early period of women in Shakespeare, which ends in the beginning of the twentieth century, is characterised by a very conventional tone and treatment and the confirmation of female submission. The editors of a 1983 collection called The Woman's Part, referencing three books by women authors from the 19th century (an authoritative book, Shakespeare's Heroines: Characteristics of Women by Anna Jameson, originally published 1832, and two fictional biographies in novel form of two of Shakespeare's heroines from 1885) conclude that these early critics are "uneasy" when Shakespeare's heroines behave "unwomanly", and that adaptations of their stories "praise girlish sweetness and modesty in a style that today appears effusive." These are, they say, "culturally induced limitations" on the part of the female critics and authors studying and adapting Shakespeare's women.

=== Modern criticism ===
Recent critics take a variety of approaches to the topic. For feminist critics influenced by French feminism, the analysis of the female body in Shakespeare's plays has proven fruitful. Carol Chillington Rutter, author of Enter the Body: Women and Representation on Shakespeare's Stage (2001), focuses for instance on the body of Cordelia, as her father, King Lear, carries her on to the stage; on the body of Ophelia in the grave; and on the bodies of the two women on the bed at the end of Othello, "a play that destroys women."

== Notable female characters ==
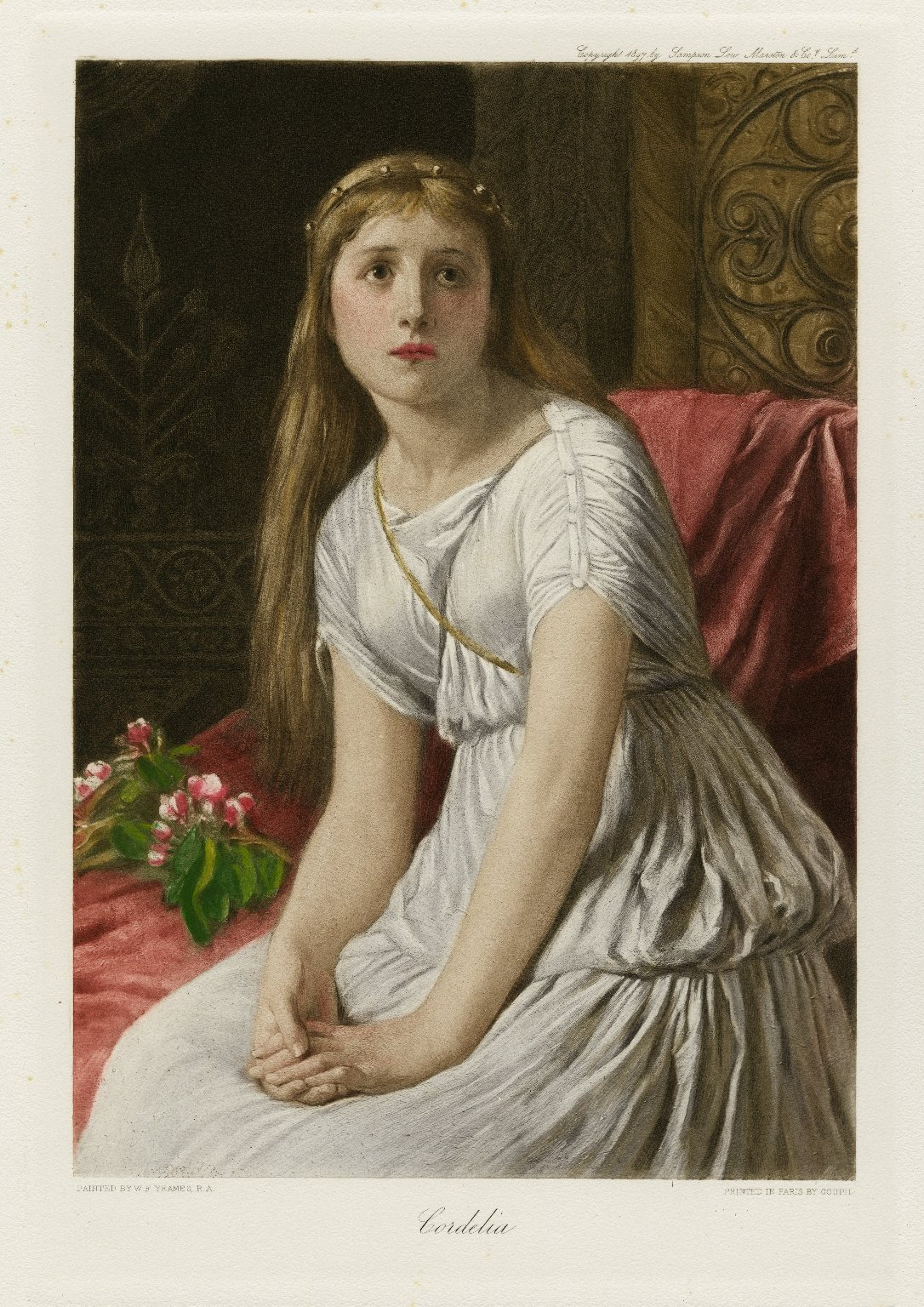
An 1896 depiction of Cordelia by William Frederick Yeames, from The Graphic Gallery of Shakespeare's Heroines

- Adriana, in The Comedy of Errors
- Beatrice, in Much Ado About Nothing
- Bianca, in The Taming of the Shrew
- Celia, in As You Like It
- Cleopatra, in Antony and Cleopatra
- Cordelia, in King Lear
- Cressida, in Troilus and Cressida
- Desdemona, in Othello
- Emilia, in Othello
- Gertrude, in Hamlet
- Goneril, in King Lear
- Hermia, in A Midsummer Night's Dream
- Helena, in A Midsummer Night's Dream
- Helena, in All's Well that Ends Well
- Hero, in Much Ado About Nothing
- Hermione, in The Winter's Tale
- Hippolyta, in A Midsummer Night's Dream
- Imogen, in Cymbeline
- Isabella, in Measure for Measure
- Julia, in The Two Gentlemen of Verona
- Juliet, in Romeo and Juliet
- Katherina, in The Taming of the Shrew
- Lady Macbeth, in Macbeth
- Lavinia Andronicus, in Titus Andronicus
- Miranda, in The Tempest
- Margaret of Anjou, in Henry VI Part 1, Part 2, Part 3 and Richard III
- Olivia, in Twelfth Night
- Ophelia, in Hamlet
- Portia, in The Merchant of Venice
- The Princess of France, in Love's Labour's Lost
- Paulina, in The Winter's Tale
- Perdita, in The Winter's Tale
- Reagan, in King Lear
- Rosalind, in As You Like It
- Rosaline (only referenced), in Romeo and Juliet
- Tamora, in Titus Andronicus
- Three Witches, in Macbeth
- Titania, in A Midsummer Night's Dream
- Viola, in Twelfth Night
- Volumnia, in Coriolanus

== Bibliography ==
- Dusinberre, Juliet (1996). Shakespeare and the nature of women. Palgrave Macmillan. ISBN 978-0-312-15973-3.
- Weber, Harold.. (1986). The restoration rake-hero: transformations in sexual understanding in seventeenth-century England. University of Wisconsin Press. ISBN 978-0-299-10690-4.
- Dlugosch, Tom (2019). Women of Resolve: Female Characters in plays attributed to Shakespeare. Amazon Kindle. ASIN B084DQTLKR
