= Margaret Mather =

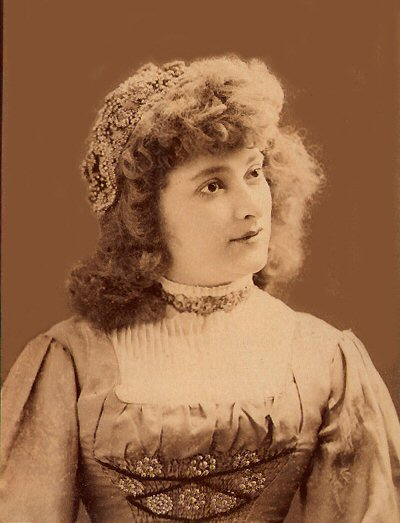
Margaret Mather

Margaret Mather (1859–1898) was a Canadian actress.

== Biography ==
She was born in poverty in Tilbury, Canada West, as Margaret Finlayson, daughter of John Finlayson, a farmer and mechanic, and Ann Mather. She was one of the most famous Shakespearean actresses in the 1880s, although her reputation arose as much from clever publicity as from her skill.

She premiered as Juliet in New York at the Union Square Theater in 1885. Heavy advance publicity guaranteed a large turnout, but response to her performance was mixed. While she was striking in her physicality and energy, many critics found her too indecorous and overbearing, particularly in the later acts. In the following years, she toured the country and returned to New York, to perpetually mixed reviews. Her noteworthy roles included Lady Macbeth, the title role in Bulwer-Lytton's The Lady of Lyons and in Augustin Daly's Leah the Forsaken.

She was a manifest failure as Joan of Arc in a translation of Jules Barbier's play on that subject in 1890. She retired early in the decade, after marrying Gustave Pabst, scion of the Pabst Brewing Company, but they divorced after she threatened him with a whip. She returned as Imogen in Cymbeline. The production, at Wallack's Theatre, was lavish, costing forty thousand dollars, but it failed; the play was too little-known to attract large audiences, and Mather herself was judged too emotional to succeed in the role.

She toured the US and Canada in 1883–1884 in the role of Juliet and As You Like It. She suffered from a chronic illness and died April 7, 1898, in Charleston, West Virginia. She was in performance of Shakespeare's Cymbeline and fell unconscious during the performance, dying that evening. Mather was buried in a white gown from her role as Juliet on Easter Sunday. She is buried in the Elmwood Cemetery in Detroit.

Margaret Mather in Romeo and Juliet

== Bibliography ==
- Brown, Thomas Allston A History of the New York Stage, Vol. 3. Dodd, Mead and Company, New York, 1903
- Gardner, David (1990). "Finlayson, Margaret, Margaret Bloomer, Margaret Mather". In Halpenny, Francess G (ed.). Dictionary of Canadian Biography. Vol. XII (1891–1900) (online ed.). University of Toronto Press.
