= Cymbeline =

Play by William Shakespeare

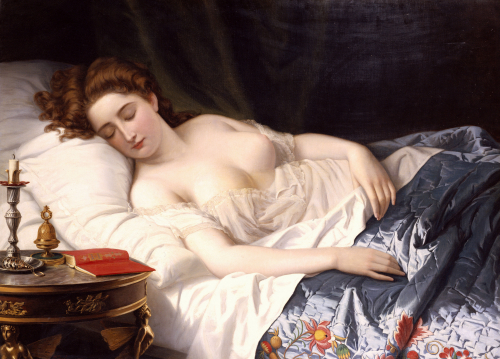
Imogen in her bedchamber in Act II, scene ii, when Iachimo witnesses the mole under her breast. Painting by Wilhelm Ferdinand Souchon, 1872

Cymbeline (/ˈsɪmbɪliːn/), also known as The Tragedie of Cymbeline or Cymbeline, King of Britain, is a play by William Shakespeare set in Ancient Britain (c. 10–14 AD) (Note: The reign of Cunobeline is dated from c. 10–40, while the reign of Augustus (mentioned five times in the play) ended in AD 14.) and based on legends that formed part of the Matter of Britain concerning the early historical Celtic British King Cunobeline. Although it is listed as a tragedy in the First Folio, modern critics often classify Cymbeline as a romance or even a comedy. Like Othello and The Winter's Tale, it deals with the themes of innocence and jealousy. While the precise date of composition remains unknown, the play was certainly produced as early as 1611.

== Characters ==
In Britain

- Cymbeline – Modelled on the historical King of Britain, Cunobeline, and father to Imogen
- Queen – Cymbeline's second wife and mother to Cloten
- Imogen / Innogen – Cymbeline's daughter by a former queen, later disguised as the page Fidele
- Posthumus Leonatus – Innogen's husband, adopted as an orphan and raised in Cymbeline's family
- Cloten – Queen's son by a former husband and step-brother to Imogen
- Belarius – banished lord living under the name Morgan, who abducted King Cymbeline's infant sons in retaliation for his banishment
- Guiderius – Cymbeline's son, kidnapped in childhood by Belarius and raised as his son Polydore
- Arvirargus – Cymbeline's son, kidnapped in childhood by Belarius and raised as his son Cadwal
- Pisanio – Posthumus's servant, loyal to both Posthumus and Imogen
- Cornelius – court physician
- Helen – lady attending Imogen
- Two Lords attending Cloten
- Two Gentlemen
- Two Captains
- Two Jailers

In Rome'

- Philario – Posthumus's host in Rome
- Iachimo/Giacomo – a Roman lord and friend of Philario
- French Gentleman
- Dutch Gentleman
- Spanish Gentleman
- Caius Lucius – Roman ambassador and later general
- Two Roman senators
- Roman tribunes
- Roman captain
- Philharmonus – soothsayer

Apparitions

- Jupiter – King of the gods in Roman mythology
- Sicilius Leonatus – Posthumus's father
- Posthumus's mother
- Posthumus's two brothers

== Summary ==
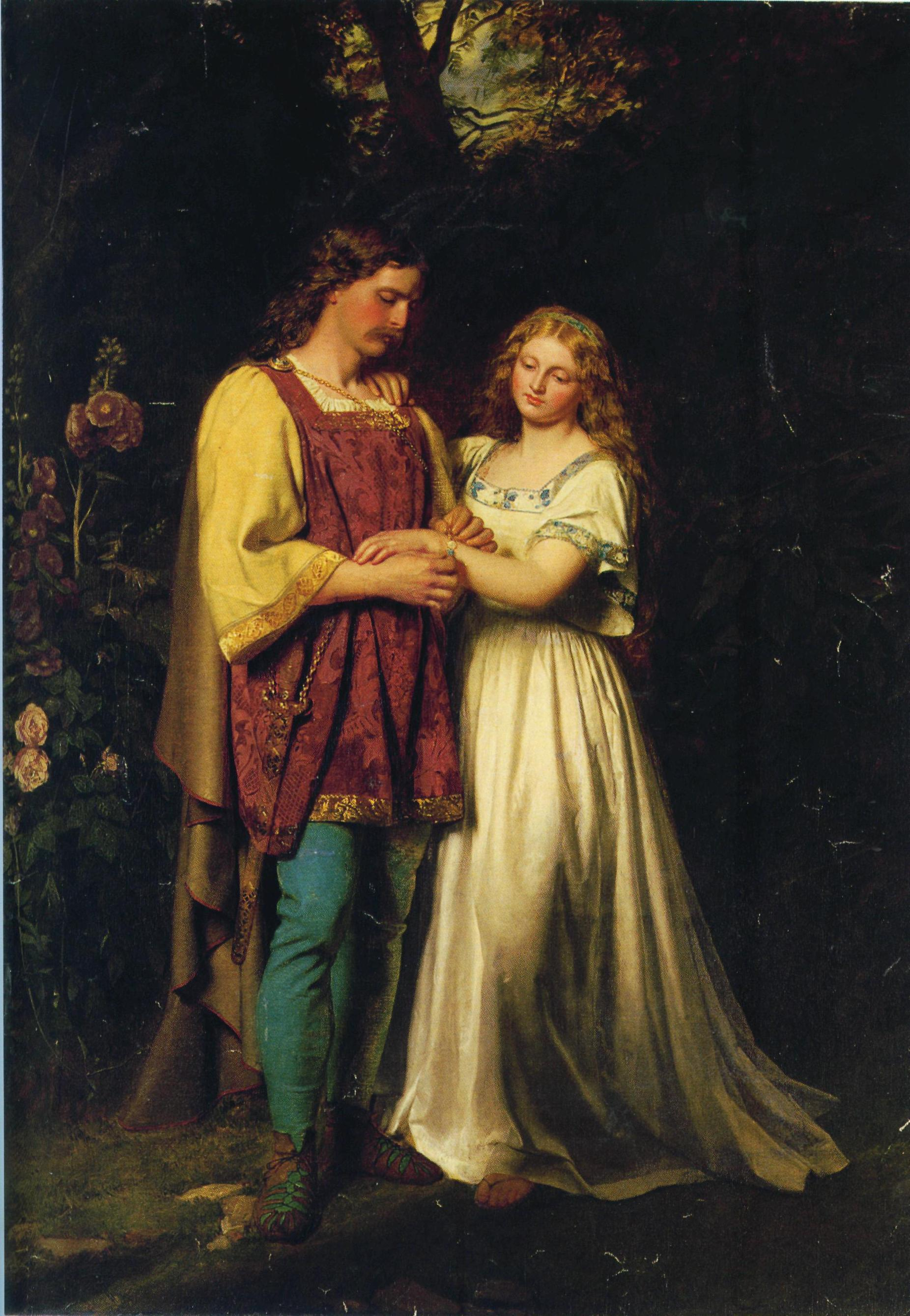
Posthumus and Imogen by John Faed.

Cymbeline is the Roman Empire's vassal king of Britain. Twenty years earlier, Cymbeline's two infant sons, Guiderius and Arvirargus, were kidnapped by an exiled traitor named Belarius. Cymbeline discovers his daughter, Imogen (or Innogen), has secretly married her lover Posthumus Leonatus, a member of Cymbeline's court. The lovers have exchanged jewellery as tokens: Imogen with a bracelet, and Posthumus with a ring. Cymbeline dismisses the marriage and banishes Posthumus since Imogen—as Cymbeline's only remaining child—must produce a fully royal-blooded heir to succeed to the British throne. In the meantime, Cymbeline's Queen is conspiring to have Cloten (her cloddish and arrogant son by an earlier marriage) marry Imogen to secure her bloodline. The Queen is also plotting to murder both Imogen and Cymbeline, procuring what she believes is deadly poison from the court doctor. The doctor, Cornelius, is suspicious and switches the poison for a harmless sleeping potion. The Queen passes the "poison" along to Pisanio, Posthumus and Imogen's loyal servant. Imogen is told it is a medicinal drug. Unable to be with Posthumus, Imogen secludes herself in her chambers, away from Cloten's aggressive advances.

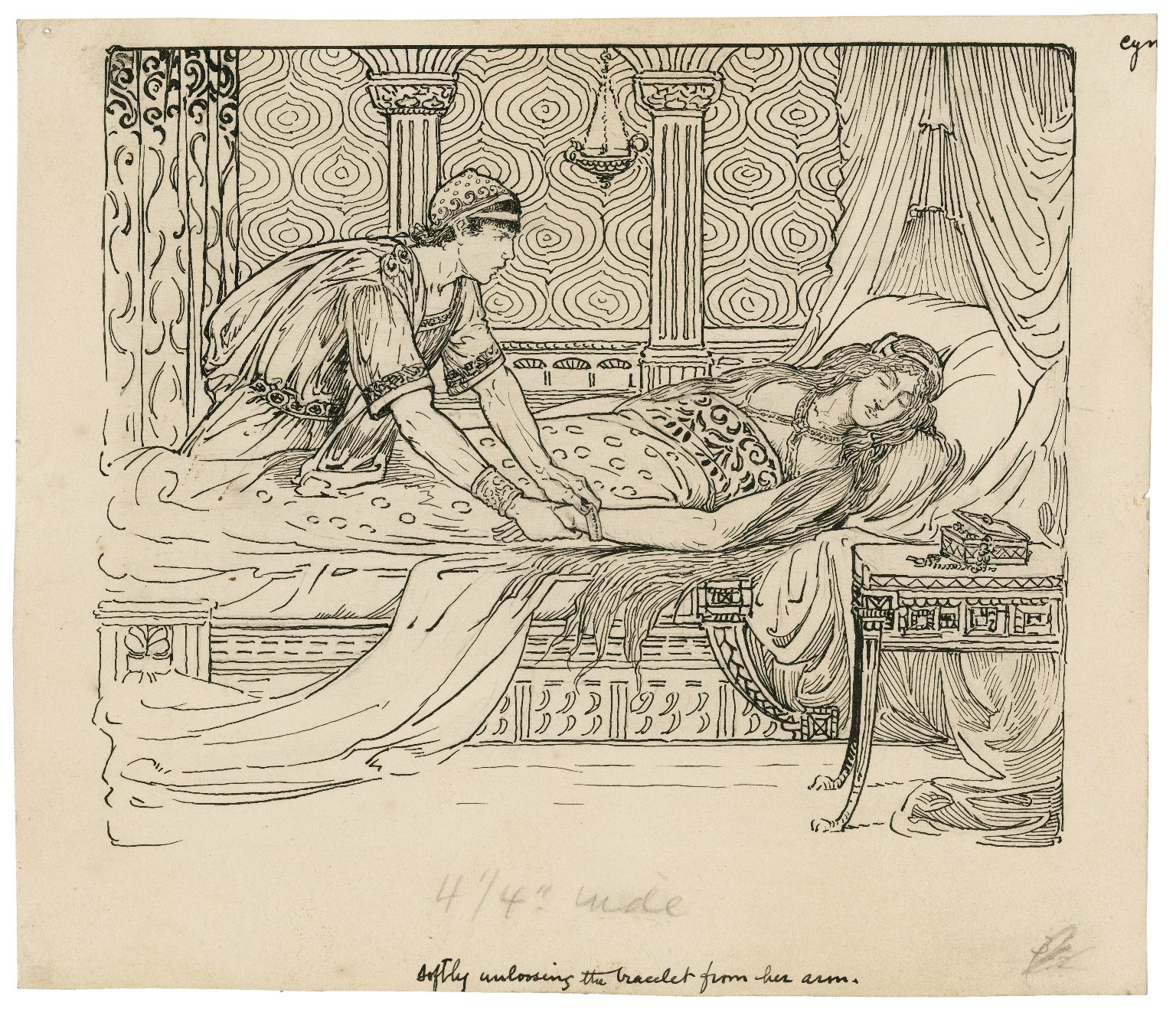
Iachimo stealing Imogen's bracelet, Act II Scene ii. Illustration by Louis Rhead, designed for an edition of Lamb's Tales, copyrighted 1918.

Posthumus must now live in Italy, where he meets Iachimo (or Giacomo), who wagers the proud Posthumus that he, Iachimo, can seduce Imogen, whom Posthumus has praised for her chastity, and will then bring Posthumus proof of Imogen's adultery. If Iachimo wins, he will get Posthumus's token ring. If Posthumus wins, not only must Iachimo pay him but also fight Posthumus in a duel with swords. Iachimo heads to Britain where he attempts to seduce the faithful Imogen, who rejects him. Iachimo then hides in a chest in Imogen's bedchamber and, when the princess falls asleep, steals Posthumus's bracelet from her. He also takes note of the room, as well as a mole on Imogen's partially nude body, to present as false evidence to Posthumus that he seduced his bride. Returning to Italy, Iachimo convinces Posthumus that he has successfully seduced Imogen. In his wrath, Posthumus sends two letters to Britain: one to Imogen, telling her to meet him at Milford Haven, on the Welsh coast; the other to the servant Pisanio, ordering him to murder Imogen at the Haven. However, Pisanio refuses and reveals Posthumus's plot to Imogen. He has Imogen disguise herself as a boy and they continue to Milford Haven to seek employment. He also gives her the Queen's "poison", believing it will alleviate her psychological distress. In the guise of a boy, Imogen assumes the name "Fidele", meaning "faithful".

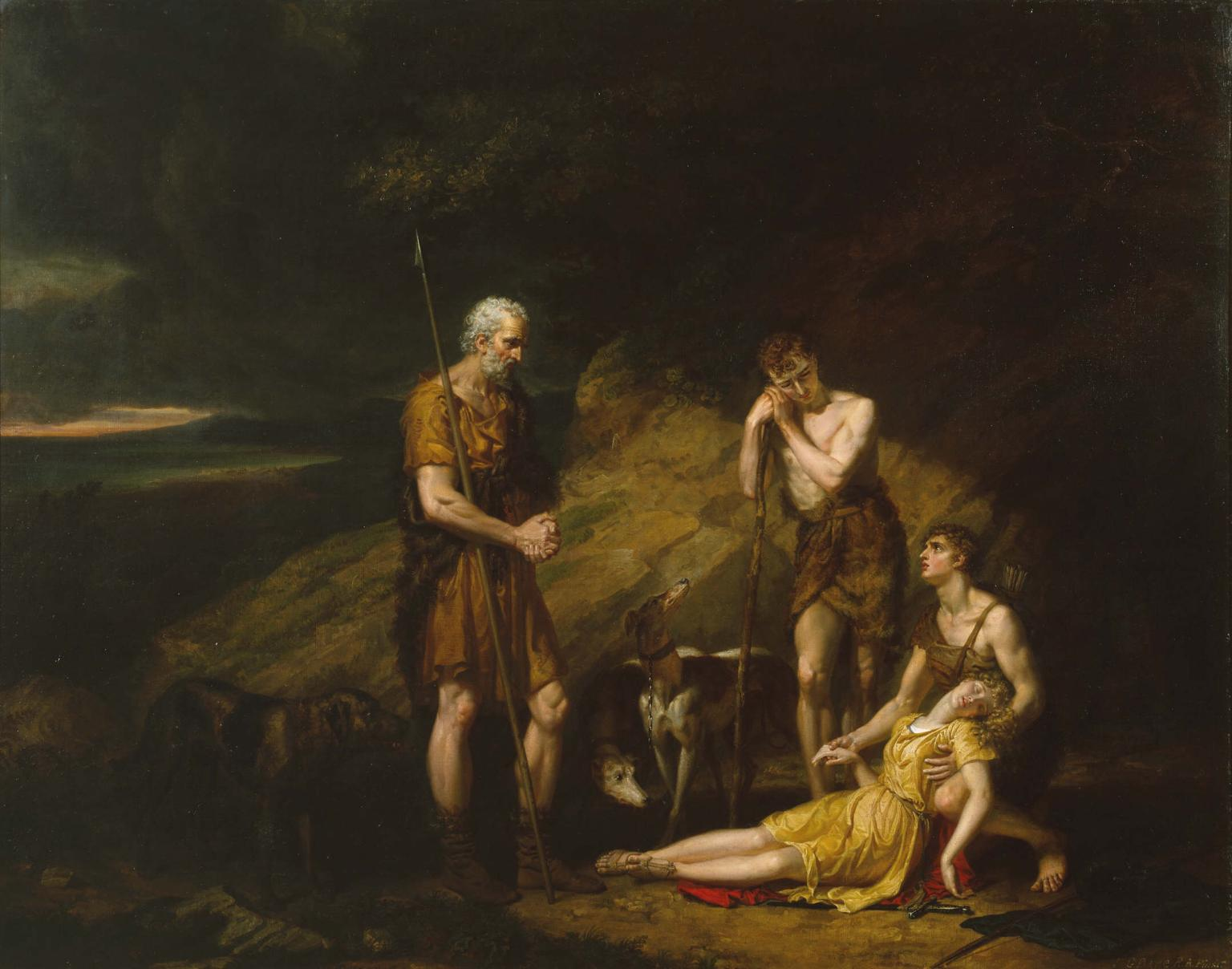
Imogen Discovered in the Cave of Belarius by George Dawe.

Back at Cymbeline's court, Cymbeline refuses to pay his British tribute to the Roman ambassador Caius Lucius. Lucius warns Cymbeline of the Roman Emperor's forthcoming wrath, which will be an invasion of Britain by Roman troops. Meanwhile, Cloten learns of the "meeting" between Imogen and Posthumus at Milford Haven. Dressing himself in Posthumus's clothes, he decides to go to Wales to kill Posthumus, and then rape, abduct, and marry Imogen. Imogen has now been travelling as Fidele through the Welsh mountains, her health in decline as she comes to a cave. It is the home of Belarius and his "sons" Polydore and Cadwal, whom he raised into great hunters. The two young men are the British princes Guiderius and Arviragus, who are unaware of their own origin. The men discover Fidele, and, instantly captivated by a strange affinity for "him", become fast friends. Outside the cave, Guiderius is met by Cloten, who insults him, leading to a sword fight during which Guiderius beheads Cloten. Meanwhile, Imogen's fragile state worsens and she takes the "poison" as a medicine; when the men re-enter, they find her "dead". They mourn and, after placing Cloten's body beside hers, briefly depart to prepare for the double burial. Imogen awakes to find the headless body, and believes it to be Posthumus because the body is wearing Posthumus's clothes. Lucius' Roman soldiers have just arrived in Britain and, as the army moves through Wales, Lucius discovers the devastated Fidele, who pretends to be a loyal servant grieving his killed master; Lucius, moved by this faithfulness, enlists Fidele as a pageboy.

The treacherous Queen is now wasting away due to her son Cloten's disappearance. Meanwhile, the guilt-ridden Posthumus enlists in the Roman forces as they invade Britain. Belarius, Guiderius, Arviragus, and Posthumus all help rescue Cymbeline from the Roman onslaught; the king does not yet recognise these four, yet takes notice of them as they fight bravely and capture the Roman commanders, Lucius and Iachimo, thus winning the day. Posthumus, allowing himself to be captured, as well as Fidele, are imprisoned alongside the true Romans, who all await execution. In jail, Posthumus sleeps, while the ghosts of his dead family appear to complain to Jupiter of his grim fate. Jupiter himself appears in thunder and glory to assure the others that destiny will grant happiness to Posthumus and Britain.

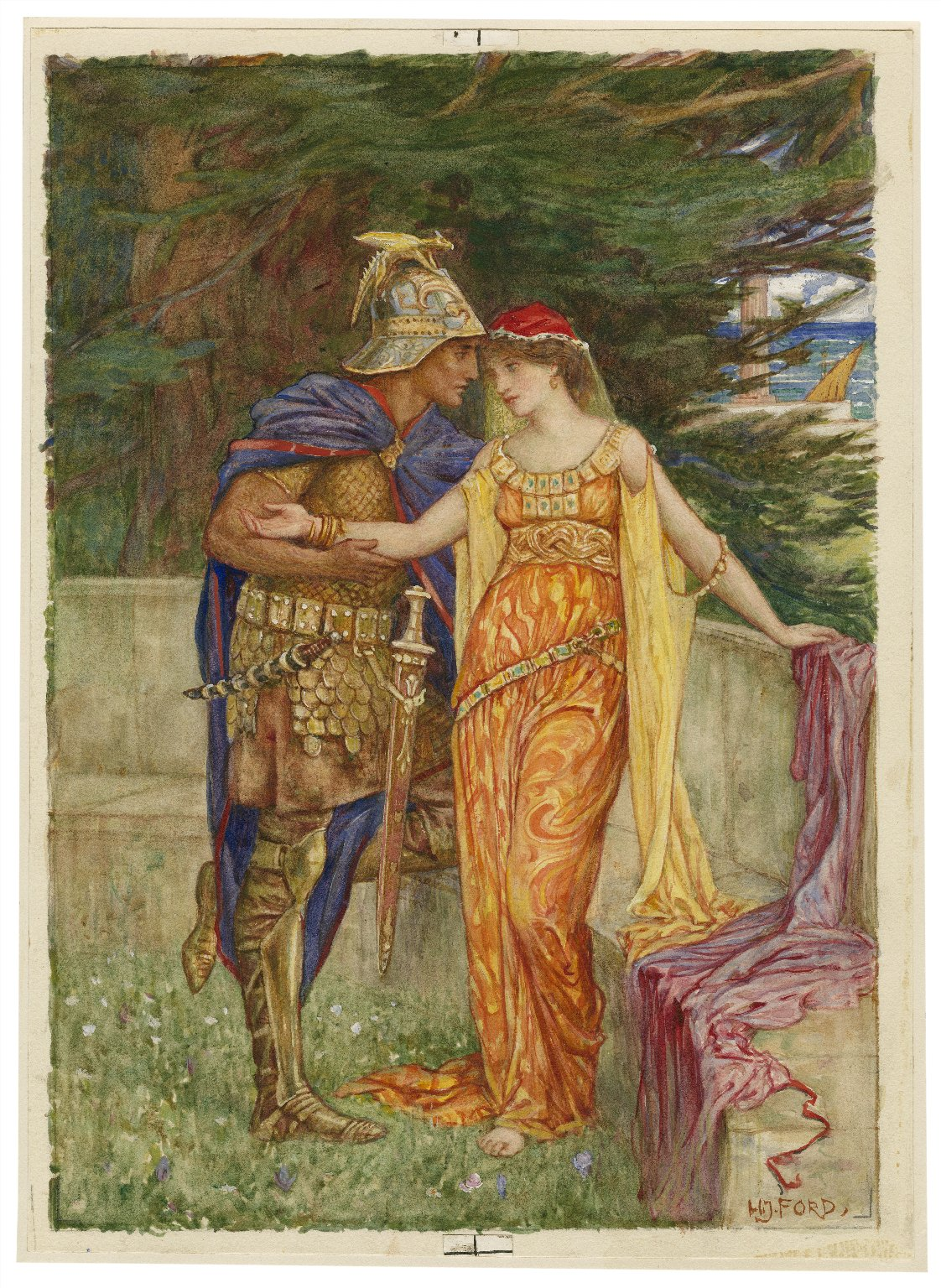
Watercolour of Posthumus and Imogen by Henry Justice Ford.

Cornelius arrives at court to announce the Queen's sudden death, and that on her deathbed she unrepentantly confessed to villainous schemes against her husband and his throne. Both troubled and relieved by this news, Cymbeline prepares to execute his prisoners, but pauses when he sees Fidele, whom he finds both beautiful and familiar. Fidele has noticed Posthumus's ring on Iachimo's finger and demands to know how he obtained it. A remorseful Iachimo confesses about the wager he made, and how he tricked Posthumus into believing he had seduced Imogen. Posthumus then comes forward to confirm Iachimo's story, revealing his identity and acknowledging his wrongfulness in wanting Imogen killed. Ecstatic, Imogen throws herself at Posthumus, who, believing she is a boy, knocks her down. Pisanio then rushes to explain that Fidele is Imogen. Imogen still suspects that Pisanio conspired with the Queen to poison her. Pisanio claims innocence, and Cornelius reveals the potion was harmless. Insisting that his betrayal years ago was a set-up, Belarius makes his own happy confession, revealing Guiderius and Arviragus as Cymbeline's own two long-lost sons. With her brothers restored to the line of inheritance, Imogen is free to marry Posthumus. An elated Cymbeline pardons Belarius and the Roman prisoners, including Lucius and Iachimo. Lucius summons his soothsayer to decipher a prophecy of recent events, which ensures happiness for all. Blaming his manipulative Queen for his refusal to pay earlier, Cymbeline now agrees to pay the tribute to the Roman Emperor as a gesture of peace between Britain and Rome.

== Sources ==
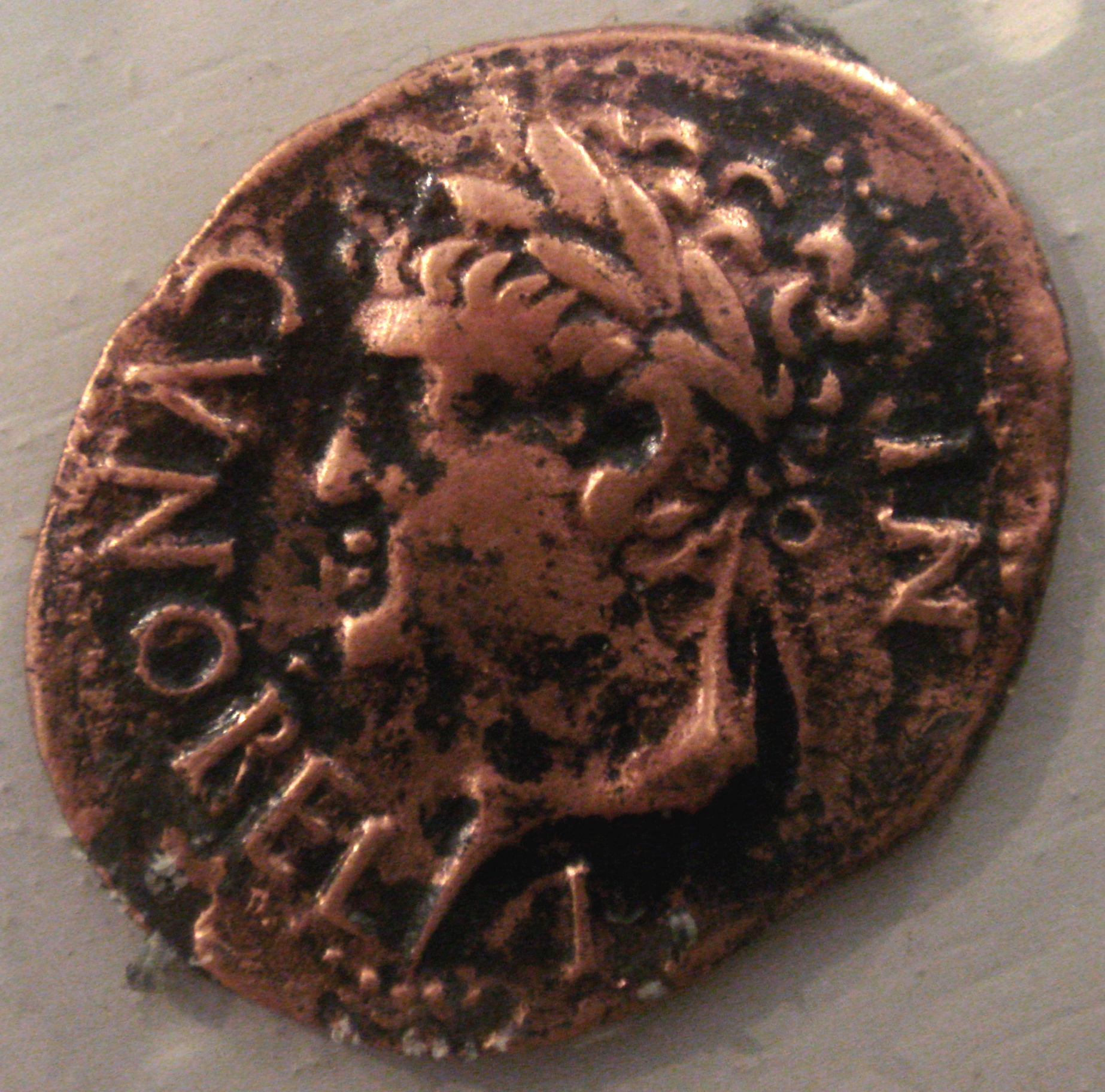
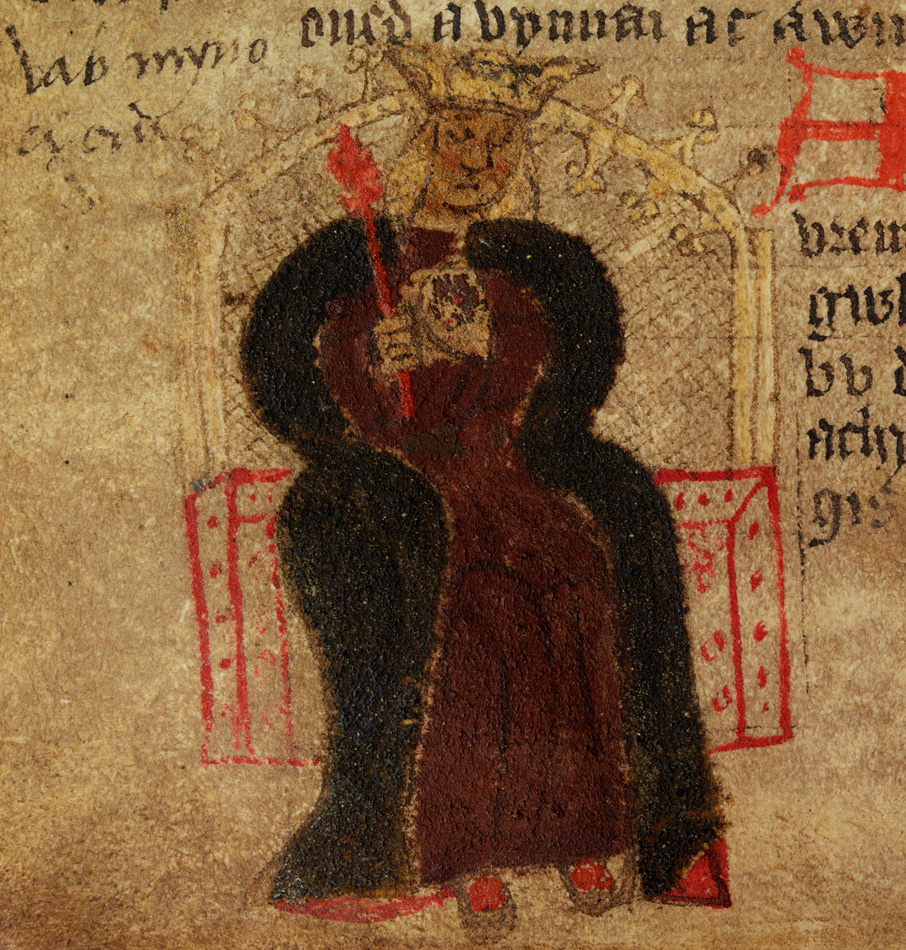
The historical Cunobelin is recorded by Roman historians and numismatic finds (left). By Shakespeare's time, he had become popular through various legends in Welsh mythology, such as the figure of Beli Mawr (right).

The story of Cymbeline is grounded in the historical British figure of Cunobeline, mentioned by Suetonius in his Life of Caligula and Orosius in Historia adversus Paganos. Cunobeline is also an important figure in Medieval Welsh literature, appearing in the Trioedd Ynys Prydein, Branwen ferch Llŷr, the Dream of Macsen Wledig, and Lludd and Llefelys as Cynfelyn (Old Welsh) or Kymbelinus (medieval Latin). In the early 9th century Historia Brittonum Cunobeline is named as "Bellinus son of Minocannus", a figure from whom many Welsh kings would claim descent in the Harleian genealogies.

Numerous variations on this Bellinus figure appear in Geoffrey of Monmouth's 12th century Historia Regum Britanniae. One such figure is Kymbelinus, a mighty warrior raised in the courts of Augustus and friendly with the Roman court. This Kymbelinus has two sons named as Guiderius and Arvirargus, with Guiderius succeeded him but dying in the early stages of the Claudian invasion, leaving Arvirargus to carry on the fight.

It is likely that Shakespeare became familiar with Geoffrey's account via the 1587 edition of Holinshed's Chronicles. Shakespeare based the setting of the play and the character Cymbeline on what he found in Holinshed's chronicles, but the plot and subplots of the play are derived from other sources. The subplot of Posthumus and Iachimo's wager derives from story II.9 of Giovanni Boccaccio's The Decameron and the anonymously authored Frederyke of Jennen. These share similar characters and wager terms, and both feature Iachimo's equivalent hiding in a chest in order to gather proof in Imogen's room. Iachimo's description of Imogen's room as proof of her infidelity derives from The Decameron, (Note: Nosworthy, J. M. (1955) Preface in Cymbeline: Second Series p.xxiv quote:... it's not possible to eliminate the debt to Boccaccio completely. The description of Imogen's bed-chamber, for instance, owes nothing to the English tale, but we have only to glance at the Decameron to discover a room in which a candle is burning, which is hung with pictures, all carefully noted by Ambrogiuolo, and to recognise at once a refinement of detail that stirred Shakespeare's imagination and set the poetry flowing from his pen.) and Pisanio's reluctance to kill Imogen and his use of her bloody clothes to convince Posthumus of her death derive from Frederyke of Jennen. In both sources, the equivalent to Posthumus's bracelet is stolen jewellery that the wife later recognises while cross-dressed. Shakespeare also drew inspiration for Cymbeline from a play called The Rare Triumphs of Love and Fortune, first performed in 1582. There are many parallels between the characters of the two plays, including a king's daughter who falls for a man of unknown birth who grew up in the king's court. The subplot of Belarius and the lost princes was inspired by the story of Bomelio, an exiled nobleman in The Rare Triumphs who is later revealed to be the protagonist's father.

== Date and text ==
The first recorded production of Cymbeline, as noted by Simon Forman, was in April 1611. It was first published in the First Folio in 1623. When Cymbeline was actually written cannot be precisely dated.

The Yale edition suggests a collaborator had a hand in the authorship, and some scenes (e.g., Act III scene 7 and Act V scene 2) may strike the reader as particularly un-Shakespearean when compared with others. The play shares notable similarities in language, situation, and plot with Beaumont and Fletcher's tragicomedy Philaster, or Love Lies a-Bleeding (c. 1609–10). Both plays concern themselves with a princess who, after disobeying her father in order to marry a lowly lover, is wrongly accused of infidelity and thus ordered to be murdered, before escaping and having her faithfulness proven. Furthermore, both were written for the same theatre company and audience. Some scholars believe this supports a dating of approximately 1609, though it is not clear which play preceded the other.

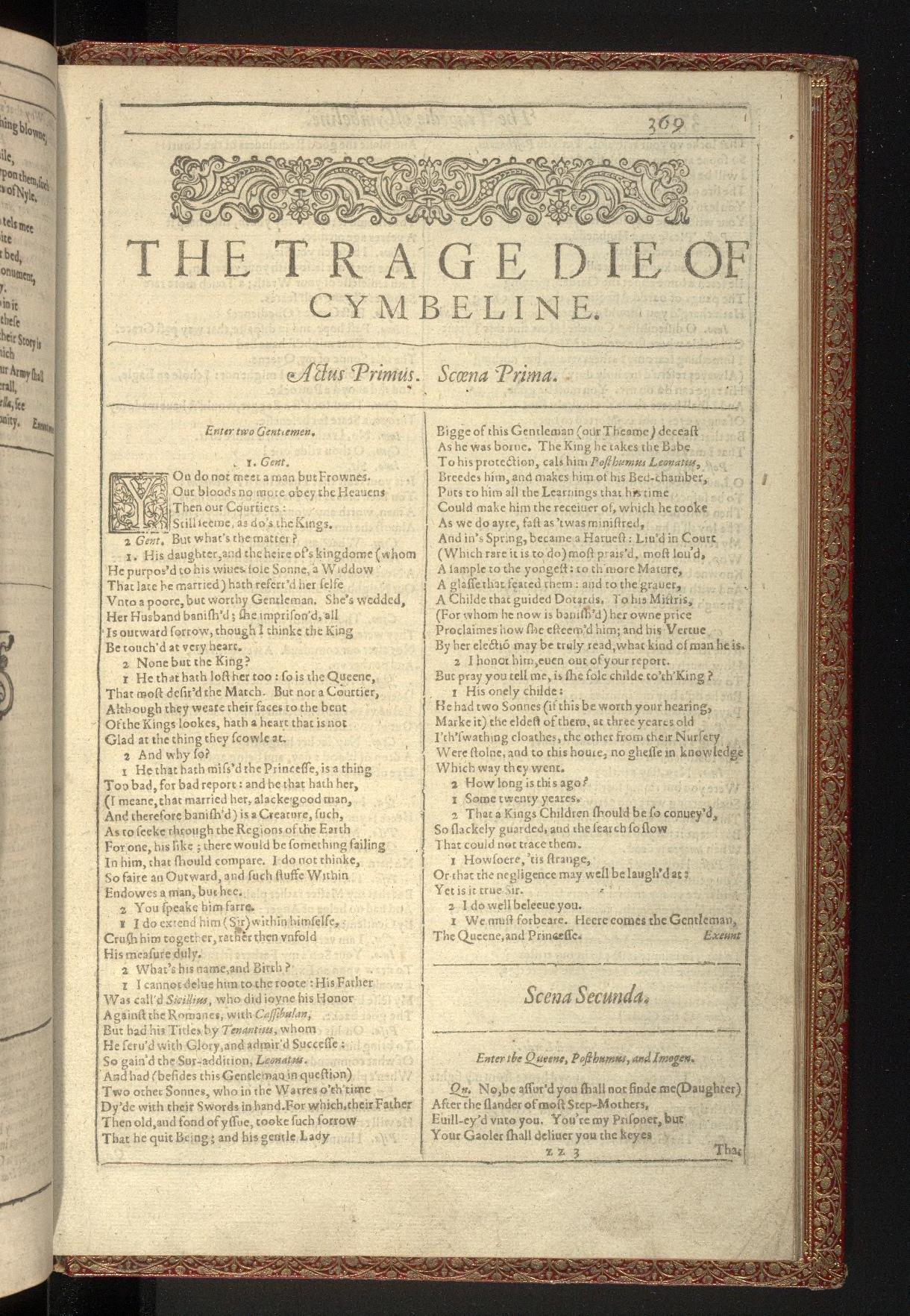
The first page of Cymbeline from the First Folio of Shakespeare's plays, published in 1623.

The editors of the Oxford and Norton Shakespeare believe the name of Imogen is a misprint for Innogen—they draw several comparisons between Cymbeline and Much Ado About Nothing, in early editions of which a ghost character named Innogen was supposed to be Leonato's wife (Posthumus being also known as "Leonatus", the Latin form of the Italian name in the other play). Stanley Wells and Michael Dobson point out that Holinshed's Chronicles, which Shakespeare used as a source, mention an Innogen and that Forman's eyewitness account of the April 1611 performance refers to "Innogen" throughout. In spite of these arguments, most editions of the play have continued to use the name Imogen.

Milford Haven is not known to have been used during the period (early 1st century AD) in which Cymbeline is set, and it is not known why Shakespeare used it in the play. Marisa R. Cull notes its possible symbolism as the landing site of Henry Tudor, when he invaded England via Milford on 7 August 1485 on his way to deposing Richard III and establishing the Tudor dynasty. It may also reflect English anxiety about the loyalty of the Welsh and the possibility of future invasions at Milford.

== Criticism and interpretation ==
Cymbeline was one of Shakespeare's more popular plays during the eighteenth century, though critics including Samuel Johnson took issue with its complex plot:

This play has many just sentiments, some natural dialogues, and some pleasing scenes, but they are obtained at the expense of much incongruity. To remark the folly of the fiction, the absurdity of the conduct, the confusion of the names and manners of different times, and the impossibility of the events in any system of life, were to waste criticism upon unresisting imbecility, upon faults too evident for detection, and too gross for aggravation.

William Hazlitt and John Keats, however, numbered it among their favourite plays.

By the early twentieth century, the play had lost favour. Lytton Strachey found it "difficult to resist the conclusion that [Shakespeare] was getting bored himself. Bored with people, bored with real life, bored with drama, bored, in fact, with everything except poetry and poetical dreams."

In 1937, Irish playwright George Bernard Shaw wrote Cymbeline Refinished, which rewrites the final act of the play. Shaw commented on the play in 1896, in one fiery critique stating it was:

Stagey trash of the lowest melodramatic order, in parts abominably written, throughout intellectually vulgar, and, judged in point of thought by modern intellectual standards, vulgar, foolish, offensive, indecent and exasperating beyond all tolerance.

Shaw, however, would go on to reform his opinion of the play after his rewriting of the ending, yet he remained firmly of the opinion that the final act was disastrous, writing in 1946 that it was "one of the finest of Shakespeare's later plays" but "goes to pieces in the final act". Harley Granville-Barker, who found success as an actor in Shaw's plays had similar views, saying that the play shows that Shakespeare was becoming a "wearied artist".

Some have argued that the play parodies its own content. Harold Bloom wrote that "Cymbeline, in my judgment, is partly a Shakespearean self-parody; many of his prior plays and characters are mocked by it."

=== British identity ===
Similarities between Cymbeline and historical accounts of the Roman Emperor Augustus have prompted critics to interpret the play as Shakespeare voicing support for the political notions of James I, who considered himself the "British Augustus". His political manoeuvres to unite Scotland with England and Wales as an empire mirror Augustus' Pax Romana. The play reinforces the Jacobean idea that Britain is the successor to the civilised virtue of ancient Rome, portraying the parochialism and isolationism of Cloten and the Queen as villainous. Other critics have resisted the idea that Cymbeline endorses James I's ideas about national identity, pointing to several characters' conflicted constructions of their geographic identities. For example, although Guiderius and Arviragus are the sons of Cymbeline, a British king raised in Rome, they grew up in a Welsh cave. The brothers lament their isolation from society, a quality associated with barbarousness, but Belarius, their adoptive father, retorts that this has spared them from corrupting influences of the supposedly civilised British court.

Iachimo's invasion of Imogen's bedchamber may reflect concern that Britain was being maligned by Italian influence. According to Peter A. Parolin, Cymbeline's scenes ostensibly set in ancient Rome may be anachronistic portrayals of sixteenth-century Italy, which was characterised by contemporary British authors as a place where vice, debauchery, and treachery had supplanted the virtue of ancient Rome. Though Cymbeline concludes with a peace forged between Britain and Rome, Iachimo's corruption of Posthumus and metaphorical rape of Imogen may demonstrate fears that Great Britain's political union with other cultures might expose Britons to harmful foreign influences.

=== Gender and sexuality ===
Scholars have emphasised that the play attributes great political significance to Imogen's virginity and chastity. There is some debate as to whether Imogen and Posthumus's marriage is legitimate. Imogen has historically been played and received as an ideal, chaste woman maintaining qualities applauded in a patriarchal structure; however, critics argue that Imogen's actions contradict these social definitions through her defiance of her father and her cross-dressing. Yet critics including Tracey Miller-Tomlinson have emphasised the ways in which the play upholds patriarchal ideology, including in the final scene, with its panoply of male victors. Whilst Imogen and Posthumus's marriage at first upholds heterosexual norms, their separation and final reunion leave open non-heterosexual possibilities, initially exposed by Imogen's cross-dressing as Fidele. Miller-Tomlinson points out the falseness of their social significance as a "perfect example" of a public "heterosexual marriage", considering that their private relations turn out to be "homosocial, homoerotic, and hermaphroditic".

Queer theory has gained traction in scholarship on Cymbeline, building upon the work of Eve Kosofsky Sedgwick and Judith Butler. Scholarship on this topic has emphasised the play's Ovidian allusions and exploration of non-normative gender/sexuality – achieved through separation from traditional society into what Valerie Traub terms "green worlds". Amongst the most obvious and frequently cited examples of this non-normative dimension of the play is the prominence of homoeroticism, as seen in Guiderius and Arviragus's semi-sexual fascination with the disguised Imogen/Fidele. In addition to homoerotic and homosocial elements, the subjects of hermaphroditism and paternity/maternity also feature prominently in queer interpretations of Cymbeline. Janet Adelman set the tone for the intersection of paternity and hermaphroditism in arguing that Cymbeline's lines, "oh, what am I, / A mother to the birth of three? Ne'er mother / Rejoiced deliverance more", amount to a "parthenogenesis fantasy". According to Adelman and Tracey Miller-Tomlinson, in taking sole credit for the creation of his children Cymbeline acts a hermaphrodite who transforms a maternal function into a patriarchal strategy by regaining control of his male heirs and daughter, Imogen. Imogen's own experience with gender fluidity and cross-dressing has largely been interpreted through a patriarchal lens. Unlike other Shakespearean agents of onstage gender fluidity – Portia, Rosalind, Viola and Julia – Imogen is not afforded empowerment upon her transformation into Fidele. Instead, Imogen's power is inherited from her father and based upon the prospect of reproduction.

== Performance history ==
After the 1611 performance mentioned by Simon Forman, there is no record of production until 1634, when the play was revived at court for Charles I and Henrietta Maria. The Caroline production was noted as being "well likte by the kinge". In 1728 John Rich staged the play with his company at Lincoln's Inn Fields, with emphasis placed on the spectacle of the production rather than the text of the play. Theophilus Cibber revived Shakespeare's text in 1744 with a performance at the Haymarket. There is evidence that Cibber put on another performance in 1746, and another in 1758.

In 1761, David Garrick edited a new version of the text. It is recognized as being close to the original Shakespeare, although there are several differences. Changes included the shortening of Imogen's burial scene and the entire fifth act, including the removal of Posthumus's dream. Garrick's text was first performed in November of that year, starring Garrick himself as Posthumus. Several scholars have indicated that Garrick's Posthumus was much liked. Valerie Wayne notes that Garrick's changes made the play more nationalistic, representing a trend in perception of Cymbeline during that period. Garrick's version of Cymbeline would prove popular; it was staged a number of times over the next few decades.

In the late eighteenth century, Cymbeline was performed in Jamaica.

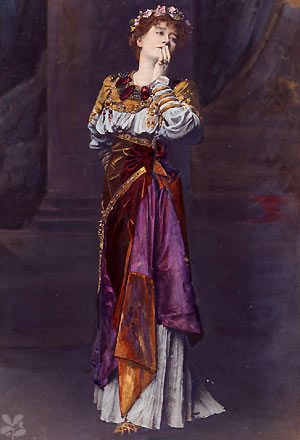
Dame Ellen Terry as Imogen.

The play entered the Romantic era with John Philip Kemble's company in 1801. Kemble's productions made use of lavish spectacle and scenery; one critic noted that during the bedroom scene, the bed was so large that Iachimo all but needed a ladder to view Imogen in her sleep. Kemble added a dance to Cloten's comic wooing of Imogen. In 1827, his brother Charles mounted an antiquarian production at Covent Garden; it featured costumes designed after the descriptions of the ancient British by such writers as Julius Caesar and Diodorus Siculus.

William Charles Macready mounted the play several times between 1837 and 1842. At the Theatre Royal, Marylebone, an epicene production was staged with Mary Warner, Fanny Vining, Anna Cora Mowatt, and Edward Loomis Davenport.

In 1859, Cymbeline was first performed in Sri Lanka. In the late nineteenth century, the play was produced several times in India.

In 1864, as part of the celebrations of Shakespeare's birth, Samuel Phelps performed the title role at Theatre Royal, Drury Lane. Helena Faucit returned to the stage for this performance.

The play was also one of Ellen Terry's last performances with Henry Irving at the Lyceum in 1896. Terry's performance was widely praised, though Irving was judged an indifferent Iachimo. Like Garrick, Irving removed the dream of Posthumus; he also curtailed Iachimo's remorse and attempted to render Cloten's character consistent. A review in the Athenaeum compared this trimmed version to pastoral comedies such as As You Like It. The set design, overseen by Lawrence Alma-Tadema, was lavish and advertised as historically accurate, though the reviewer for the time complained of such anachronisms as gold crowns and printed books as props.

Similarly lavish but less successful was Margaret Mather's production in New York in 1897. The sets and publicity cost $40,000, but Mather was judged too emotional and undisciplined to succeed in a fairly cerebral role.

=== 20th century ===
Barry Jackson staged a modern dress production for the Birmingham Rep in 1923, two years before his influential modern dress Hamlet. Walter Nugent Monck brought his Maddermarket Theatre production to Stratford in 1946, inaugurating the post-war tradition of the play.

London saw two productions in the 1956 season. Michael Benthall directed the less successful production at The Old Vic. The set design by Audrey Cruddas was notably minimal, with only a few essential props. She relied instead on a variety of lighting effects to reinforce mood; actors seemed to come out of darkness and return to darkness. Barbara Jefford was criticised as too cold and formal for Imogen; Leon Gluckman played Posthumus, Derek Godfrey Iachimo, and Derek Francis Cymbeline. Following Victorian practice, Benthall drastically shortened the last act.

By contrast, Peter Hall's production at the Shakespeare Memorial presented nearly the entire play, including the long-neglected dream scene (although a golden eagle designed for Jupiter turned out too heavy for the stage machinery and was not used). Hall presented the play as a distant fairy tale, with stylised performances. The production received favourable reviews, both for Hall's conception and, especially, for Peggy Ashcroft's Imogen. Richard Johnson played Posthumus, and Robert Harris Cymbeline. Iachimo was played by Geoffrey Keen, whose father Malcolm had played Iachimo with Ashcroft at the Old Vic in 1932.

Hall's approach attempted to unify the play's diversity by means of a fairy-tale topos. The next major Royal Shakespeare Company production, in 1962, went in the opposite direction. Working on a set draped with heavy white sheets, director William Gaskill employed Brechtian alienation effects, to mixed critical reviews. The acting, however, was widely praised. Vanessa Redgrave as Imogen was often compared favourably to Ashcroft; Eric Porter was a success as Iachimo, as was Clive Swift as Cloten. Patrick Allen was Posthumus, and Tom Fleming played the title role.

A decade later, John Barton's 1974 production for the RSC (with assistance from Clifford Williams) featured Sebastian Shaw in the title role, Tim Pigott-Smith as Posthumus, Ian Richardson as Iachimo, and Susan Fleetwood as Imogen. Charles Keating was Cloten. As with contemporary productions of Pericles, this one used a narrator (Cornelius) to signal changes in mood and treatment to the audience. Robert Speaight disliked the set design, which he called too minimal, but he approved the acting.

In 1980, David Jones revived the play for the RSC; the production was in general a disappointment, although Judi Dench as Imogen received reviews that rivalled Ashcroft's. Ben Kingsley played Iachimo; Roger Rees was Posthumus. In 1987, Bill Alexander directed the play in The Other Place (later transferring to the Pit in London's Barbican Centre) with Harriet Walter playing Imogen, David Bradley as Cymbeline and Nicholas Farrell as Posthumus.

At the Stratford Festival, the play was directed in 1970 by Jean Gascon and in 1987 by Robin Phillips. The latter production, which was marked by much-approved scenic complexity, featured Colm Feore as Iachimo, and Martha Burns as Imogen. The play was again at Stratford in 2004, directed by David Latham. A large medieval tapestry unified the fairly simple stage design and underscored Latham's fairy-tale inspired direction.

In 1994, Ajay Chowdhury directed an Anglo-Indian production of Cymbeline at the Rented Space Theatre Company. Set in India under British rule, the play features Iachimo, played by Rohan Kenworthy, as a British soldier and Imogen, played by Uzma Hameed, as an Indian princess.

=== 21st century ===
At the new Globe Theatre in 2001, a cast of six (including Abigail Thaw, Mark Rylance, and Richard Hope) used extensive doubling for the play. The cast wore identical costumes even when in disguise, allowing for particular comic effects related to doubling (as when Cloten attempts to disguise himself as Posthumus.)

There have been some well-received theatrical productions including the Public Theater's 1998 production in New York City, directed by Andrei Șerban. Cymbeline was also performed at the Cambridge Arts Theatre in October 2007 in a production directed by Sir Trevor Nunn, and in November 2007 at the Chicago Shakespeare Theatre. The play was included in the 2013 repertory season of the Oregon Shakespeare Festival.

In 2004 and 2014, the Hudson Shakespeare Company of New Jersey produced two distinct versions of the play. The 2004 production, directed by Jon Ciccarelli, embraced the fairy tale aspect of the story and produced a colourful version with wicked step-mothers, feisty princesses and a campy Iachimo. The 2014 version, directed by Rachel Alt, went in a completely opposite direction and placed the action on ranch in the American Old West. The Queen was a southern belle married to a rancher, with Imogen as a high society girl in love with the cowhand Posthumous.

In a 2007 Cheek by Jowl production, Tom Hiddleston doubled as Posthumus and Cloten.

In 2011, the Shakespeare Theatre Company of Washington, DC, presented a version of the play that emphasised its fable and folklore elements, set as a tale within a tale, as told to a child.

In 2012, Antoni Cimolino directed a production at the Stratford Festival that steered into the fairy-tale elements of the text.

Also in 2012, the South Sudan Theatre Company staged Cymbeline in Juba Arabic for the Shakespeare's Globe "Globe to Globe" festival. It was translated by Derik Uya Alfred and directed by Joseph Abuk. Connections between the content of the play and South Sudan's own political struggle have been drawn by the production's producers, as well as some scholars. Overall, the production was well received by audiences and critics. Critic Matt Truman gave the production four out of five stars, saying "The world's youngest nation seems delighted to be here and, played with this much heart, even Shakespeare's most rambling romance becomes irresistible."

In 2013, Samir Bhamra directed the play for Phizzical Productions with six actors playing multiple parts for a UK national tour. The cast included Sophie Khan Levy as Innojaan, Adam Youssefbeygi, Tony Hasnath, Liz Jadav and Robby Khela. The production was set in the souks of Dubai and the Bollywood film industry during the 1990s communal riots and received acclaim from reviewers and academics alike.

Also in 2013, a folk musical adaptation of Cymbeline was performed at the First Folio Theatre in Oak Brook, Illinois. The setting was the American South during the Civil War, with Cymbeline as a man of high status who avoids military service. The play was performed outdoors and was accompanied by traditional Appalachian folk songs.

In 2015, at Shakespeare's Globe in the Sam Wanamaker Playhouse, a production was directed by Sam Yates where the role of Innogen was played by Emily Barber and Jonjo O'Neill as Posthumus.

In 2016, Melly Still directed Cymbeline at the Royal Shakespeare Company. This version of the play was performed at the Royal Shakespeare Theatre before moving to the Barbican in late 2016. The performance featured Bethan Cullinane as Innogen and Gillian Bevan as Cymbeline.

In 2023, Gregory Doran directed Cymbeline at the Royal Shakespeare Theatre. It was his final production as artistic director, and received largely positive reviews. The cast included Peter De Jersey as Cymbeline and Amber James as Imogen.

Also in 2023, San Francisco's Free Shakespeare in the Park performed Cymbeline, directed by Maryssa Wanlass, with a David Bowie/fantasy-themed focus on the play's queer interpretations.

In 2024, at the Stratford Festival, Cymbeline, directed by Esther Jun, reversed the gender of several roles, with Cymbeline portrayed as Queen of Britain by Lucy Peacock and her husband as a Duke, played by Rick Roberts. Innogen was played by Allison Edwards-Crewe.

== Adaptations ==
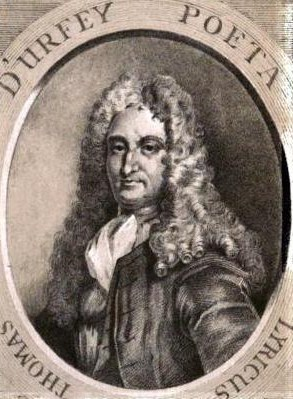
Image of Thomas D'Urfey, who adapted Shakespeare's Cymbeline in 1682.

The play was adapted by Thomas d'Urfey as The Injured Princess, or, the Fatal Wager; this version was produced at the Theatre Royal, Drury Lane, presumably by the united King's Company and Duke's Company, in 1682. The play changes some names and details, and adds a subplot, typical of the Restoration, in which a virtuous waiting-woman escapes the traps laid by Cloten. D'Urfey also changes Pisanio's character so that he at once believes in Imogen's (Eugenia, in D'Urfey's play) guilt. For his part, D'Urfey's Posthumus is ready to accept that his wife might have been untrue, as she is young and beautiful. Some details of this alteration survived in productions at least until the middle of the century.

William Hawkins revised the play again in 1759. His was among the last of the heavy revisions designed to bring the play in line with classical unities. He cut the Queen, reduced the action to two places (the court and a forest in Wales). The dirge "With fairest flowers..." was set to music by Thomas Arne.

Nearer the end of the century, Henry Brooke wrote an adaptation which was apparently never staged. His version eliminates the brothers altogether as part of a notable enhancement of Posthumus's role in the play.

George Bernard Shaw, who criticized the play perhaps more harshly than he did any of Shakespeare's other works, took aim at what he saw as the defects of the final act in his 1937 Cymbeline Refinished; as early as 1896, he had complained about the absurdities of the play to Ellen Terry, then preparing to act Imogen. He called it "stagey trash of the lowest melodramatic order". He later changed his view, saying it was "one of the finest of Shakespeare's later plays", but he remained convinced that it "goes to pieces in the final act". Accordingly, in Cymbeline Refinished he rewrote the last act, cutting many of the numerous revelations and expositions, while also making Imogen a much more assertive figure in line with his feminist views.

There have been a number of radio adaptations of Cymbeline between the 1930s and the 2000s. The BBC broadcast productions of Cymbeline in the United Kingdom in 1934, 1951, 1957, 1986, 1996, and 2006. NBC broadcast a production of the play in the United States in 1938. In October 1951 the BBC aired a production of George Bernard Shaw's Cymbeline Refinished, as well as Shaw's foreword to the play.

=== Screen adaptations ===
Cymbeline (1913), directed by Lucius J. Henderson

Lucius J. Henderson directed the first screen adaptation of Cymbeline in 1913. The film was produced by the Thanhouser Company and starred Florence La Badie as Imogen, James Cruze as Posthumus, William Garwood as Iachimo, William Russell as Cymbeline, and Jean Darnell as the Queen.

In 1937 the BBC broadcast several scenes of André van Gyseghem's production of the play, which opened 16 November the same year, on television. The scenes that comprised the broadcast were pulled exclusively from Acts I and II of the play, and included the 'trunk scene' from Act II Scene 2. In 1956 the BBC produced a similar television program, this time airing scenes from Michael Benthall's theatrical production, which opened 11 September 1956. Like the 1937 program, the 1956 broadcast ran for roughly half an hour and presented several scenes from Cymbeline, including the trunk scene.

In 1968 Jerzy Jarocki directed an adaptation of the play for Polish television, starring Wiktor Sadecki as Cymbeline and Ewa Lassek as Imogen.

Elijah Moshinsky directed the BBC Television Shakespeare adaptation in 1982, ignoring the ancient British period setting in favour of a more timeless and snow-laden atmosphere inspired by Rembrandt and his contemporary Dutch painters. Richard Johnson, Claire Bloom, Helen Mirren, and Robert Lindsay play Cymbeline, his Queen, Imogen, and Iachimo, respectively, with Michael Pennington as Posthumus.

In 2014, Ethan Hawke and director Michael Almereyda, who previously collaborated on the 2000 film Hamlet, re-teamed for the film Cymbeline, in which Hawke plays Iachimo. The film is set in the context of urban gang warfare. Ed Harris takes the title role. Penn Badgley plays the orphan Posthumus; Milla Jovovich plays the role of the Queen; Anton Yelchin is Cloten; and Dakota Johnson plays the role of Imogen.

== Stage adaptions ==
Prior to operatic adaptations only incidental music was composed. The first operatic adaption seems to be composed by Edmond Missa in 1894, under the title "Dinah"; American composer Christopher Berg composed another one, of which scenes were performed in 2009.

== Cultural references ==
In Beethoven's one opera Fidelio, the loyal wife Leonore, disguising herself as a man, takes on the name Fidelio, as a probable reference to Imogen's cross-dressing as Fidele.

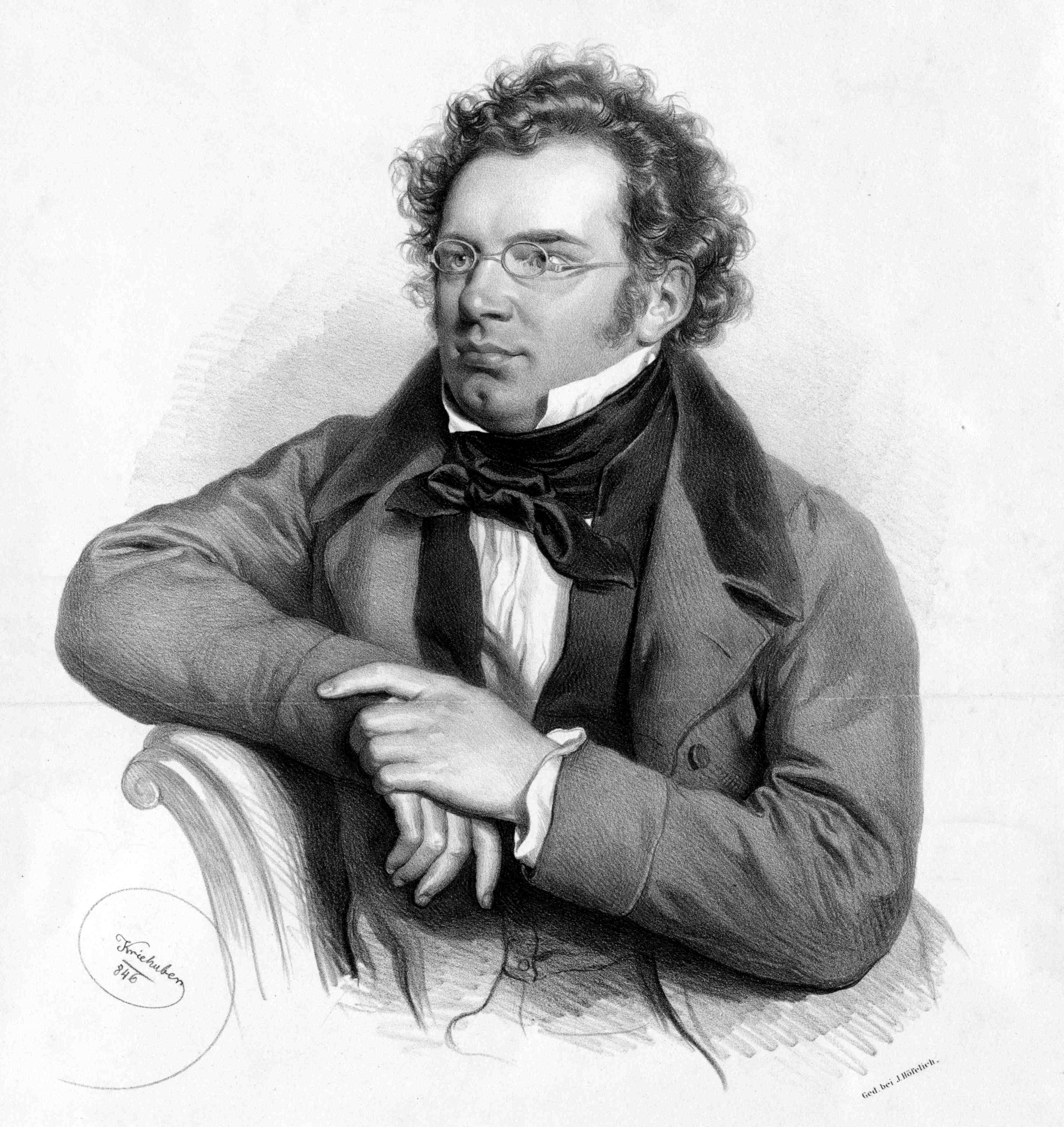
A portrait of Franz Schubert, who composed a lied for the song "Hark, hark! the lark".

The 'Song' from Act II, Scene 3 ("Hark, hark! the lark") was set to music by Franz Schubert in 1826.

Perhaps the most famous verses in the play come from the funeral song of Act IV, Scene 2, which begins:

Fear no more the heat o' the sun,
Nor the furious winter's rages;
Thou thy worldly task hast done,
Home art gone, and ta'en thy wages:
Golden lads and girls all must,
As chimney-sweepers, come to dust.

The first two lines are quoted by Virginia Woolf in Mrs Dalloway by the two main characters Clarissa and Septimus Smith. The lines, which turn Mrs Dalloway's thoughts to the trauma of the First World War, are at once an elegiac dirge and a profoundly dignified declaration of endurance. The song provides a major organisational motif for the novel. The final couplet also appears in the Anton Myrer novel, The Last Convertible.

The last two lines appear to have inspired T. S. Eliot in "Lines to a Yorkshire Terrier" (in Five-Finger Exercises). He writes:

Pollicle dogs and cats all must
Jellicle cats and dogs all must
Like undertakers, come to dust.

The song was set to music by Roger Quilter as "Fear No More the Heat o' the Sun", No. 1 of Five Shakespeare Songs, Op. 23 (1921). It was also set by Gerald Finzi as part of his song cycle on texts by Shakespeare Let Us Garlands Bring (1942). The text is sung by Cleo Laine to music by John Dankworth on her 1964 album Shakespeare and All That Jazz.

At the end of Stephen Sondheim's The Frogs, William Shakespeare is competing against George Bernard Shaw for the title of best playwright, deciding which of them is to be brought back from the dead in order to improve the world. Shakespeare sings the funeral song of Act IV, Scene 2, when asked about his view of death (the song is titled "Fear No More").

"Fear no more the heat of the sun" is the line that Winnie and her husband are trying to remember in Samuel Beckett's Happy Days as they sit exposed to the elements.

In the epilogue of the novel Appointment with Death by Agatha Christie, the first four lines of the verse are quoted by the character Ginevra Boynton as she reflects on the life of her deceased mother Mrs Boynton.

In The Scent of Water (1963) by Elizabeth Goudge, the central character, Mary Lindsay, feels struck by lightning when she realises she has fallen in love with Paul Randall, an author and Royal Air Force pilot, blinded in the last days of World War II, and married. "Fear no more the lightning-flash", Mary suddenly thinks, along with the rest of that stanza, ending "All lovers young, all lovers must / Consign to thee, and come to dust", knowing she must hide her love, and recognising that, already fifty, she is growing old (Chapter IX, Part 1, p 164).

== Bibliography ==
=== Editions of Cymbeline ===
- Dowden, Edward, ed. (1903). Cymbeline. The Arden Shakespeare, first series. London: Methuen.
- Nosworthy, J.M., ed. (1955). Cymbeline. Aberdeen University Press.
- Warren, Roger, ed. (1998). Cymbeline. Oxford: Clarendon Press.
- Wayne, Valerie, ed. (2017). Cymbeline. The Arden Shakespeare, third series. New York: Bloomsbury. ISBN 978-1-904271-30-7. OCLC 972096906.
- Wells, Stanley; Pitcher, John; Spencer, TJB; Edmondson, Paul, eds. (2005). Cymbeline. Penguin UK. ISBN 978-0-14-192162-4.

=== Secondary sources ===
- Adelman, Janet (1992). Suffocating Mothers. New York: Routledge.
- Bergeron, David M. (1980). "Cymbeline: Shakespeare's Last Roman Play". Shakespeare Quarterly. 31 (1): 31–41. doi:10.2307/2869367. ISSN 0037-3222. JSTOR 2869367.
- Bevington, David; Kastan, David Scott, eds. (2009). The Late Romances. Random House Publishing Group. ISBN 978-0-307-42183-8.
- Bloom, Harold (2000). Shakespeare's Romances. Philadelphia: Chelsea House. ISBN 9780791056578.
- Bloomekatz, Ari (16 May 2012). "South Sudan troupe sees new country's struggle in Shakespeare". Los Angeles Times. ISSN 0458-3035. Archived from the original on 25 April 2019.
- Boling, Ronald J. (1 April 2000). "Anglo-Welsh Relations in Cymbeline". Shakespeare Quarterly. 51 (1): 33–66. doi:10.2307/2902322. ISSN 0037-3222. JSTOR 2902322.
- "British Universities Film & Video Council". bufvc.ac.uk.
- Brooke, Michael. "Cymbeline (1983)". BFI Screenonline. Archived from the original on 7 September 2009.
- Bullough, Geoffrey (1980). Narrative and Dramatic Sources of Shakespeare. Vol. 8. New York: Columbia University Press. ISBN 978-0-231-08898-5.
- Bullough, Geoffrey (1975). Narrative and Dramatic Sources of Shakespeare. Vol. 7. Routledge. ISBN 978-0-231-08897-8.
- Chambers, E. K. (1988) [1930]. William Shakespeare; A Study of Facts and Problems. Vol. 2. Oxford University Press. ISBN 978-0-19-811774-2.
- "Christopher Berg". Art Song Preservation Society of New York.
- Collier, Susan (1998). "Cutting to the Heart of the Matter". In Murray, Gillian Kendall (ed.). Shakespearean Power and Punishment: A Volume of Essays. Fairleigh Dickinson University Press. ISBN 978-0-8386-3679-4.
- Collins, Toby (9 May 2012). "South Sudan Theatre Company perform Cymbeline in London – Sudan Tribune: Plural news and views on Sudan". www.sudantribune.com. Archived from the original on 25 April 2019.
- "Confusion and Deception as a Royal Family Affair". The New York Times. 4 May 2007.
- Cull, Marisa R. (19 September 2018). Shakespeare's Princes of Wales: English Identity and the Welsh Connection. Oxford University Press. ISBN 978-0-19-871619-8 – via Google Books.
- Cunningham, Karen (1994). "Female Fidelities on Trial: Proof in the Howard Attainder and "Cymbeline"". Renaissance Drama. 25: 1–31. doi:10.1086/rd.25.41917304. ISSN 0486-3739. JSTOR 41917304. S2CID 193046468.
- "Cymbelin · British Universities Film & Video Council". British Universities Film & Video Council. 1968.
- "Cymbeline". 1913.
- "Cymbeline – The Belgrade Theatre, Coventry". The Reviews Hub. Public Reviews. 18 September 2013. Archived from the original on 5 October 2013.
- "Cymbeline · British Universities Film & Video Council". bufvc.ac.uk. 1934.
- "Cymbeline – British Universities Film & Video Council". bufvc.ac.uk. 1938.
- "Cymbeline – British Universities Film & Video Council". bufvc.ac.uk. 1951.
- "Cymbeline – British Universities Film & Video Council". bufvc.ac.uk. 1957.
- "Cymbeline · British Universities Film & Video Council". bufvc.ac.uk. 1986.
- "Cymbeline · British Universities Film & Video Council". bufvc.ac.uk. 1996.
- "Cymbeline · British Universities Film & Video Council". bufvc.ac.uk. 2006.
- "Cymbeline in Washington, DC at Shakespeare Theatre Company – Lansburgh Theatre". BroadwayWorld.com. 2011.
- "Cymbeline · Jonathan Silent Film Collection". Jonathan Silent Film Collection. 1 January 1913.
- "Cymbeline Refinished · British Universities Film & Video Council". bufvc.ac.uk. 1951.
- "Cymbeline Reviews". Phizzical. 10 October 2013. Archived from the original on 22 April 2019.
- "Cymbeline (TV Movie 1982)". IMDb.
- "Decameron Web | Texts". www.brown.edu.
- Dobson, Michael; Wells, Stanley, eds. (2001). The Oxford Companion to Shakespeare. Oxford: Oxford University Press. ISBN 978-0-19-811735-3.
- Dobson, Michael; Wells, Stanley; Sharpe, Will; Sullivan, Erin, eds. (2015). The Oxford Companion to Shakespeare (2nd ed.). Oxford: Oxford University Press. ISBN 978-0-19-870873-5.
- Dukore, Bernard F. (1973). Bernard Shaw, Playwright: Aspects of Shavian Drama. Columbia: University of Missouri Press. ISBN 978-0-8262-0146-1.
- Dunnett, Roderic (27 January 2014). "Cymbeline review". The Stage. Archived from the original on 2 April 2015.
- "Ethan Hawke To Reunite With 'Hamlet' Director For Modern-Day 'Cymbeline'". Deadline Hollywood. 31 July 2013.
- Feerick, Jean (2016). Strangers in Blood: Relocating Race in the Renaissance. doi:10.3138/9781442686946. ISBN 978-1-4426-8694-6. OCLC 1013939031. S2CID 192232406.
- Findlater, Richard (1983). These Our Actors. London: Elm Tree Books.
- Floyd-Wilson, Mary (2003). English Ethnicity and Race in Early Modern Drama. Cambridge, U.K.; New York, NY: Cambridge University Press. ISBN 978-0-521-81056-2. OCLC 50339552.
- "Foreword to 'Cymbeline Refinished' · British Universities Film & Video Council". bufvc.ac.uk. 1951.
- Hackett, Helen (2000). Women and Romance Fiction in the English Renaissance. Cambridge: Cambridge University Press.
- Halliday, F. E. (1952). A Shakespeare Companion, 1550–1950. New York: Funk & Wagnalls.
- Halliday, F. E. (1969) [1964]. A Shakespeare Companion 1564–1964. Baltimore: Penguin Books. ISBN 978-0-14-053011-7.
- Hart, Jonathan (2011). Shakespeare and His Contemporaries. Palgrave Macmillan.
- "Here begynneth a propre treatyse of a marchauntes wyfe, that afterwarde wente lyke a man and became a grete lorde, and was called Frederyke of Iennen". eebo.chadwyck.com. 1560.
- Hoeniger, F.D. (Winter 1957). "Two Notes on Cymbeline". Shakespeare Quarterly. 8 (1). Oxford University Press: 132–33. doi:10.2307/2867546. JSTOR 2867546.
- Irving, Henry; Marshall, Frank A., eds. (1890). The Works of William Shakespeare. London: Scribner and Welford.
- Jacobs, Henry E. (1982). Cymbeline: An Annotated Bibliography. Garland. ISBN 978-0-8240-9258-0. OCLC 1011808615.
- Kabatchnik, Amnon (2017). Blood on the Stage, 1600 to 1800: Milestone Plays of Murder, Mystery, and Mayhem. Rowman & Littlefield. ISBN 978-1-5381-0616-7.
- Kerrigan, John (2010). Archipelagic English: literature, history, and politics 1603–1707. Oxford: Oxford University Press. ISBN 978-0-19-818384-6. OCLC 750907664.
- Kleij, Sonja; Mullin, Romano; Williamson, Matt (9 January 2014). "Cymbeline (Phizzical) @ Grand Opera House, Belfast, 2013 – Reviewing Shakespeare". Reviewing Shakespeare. Archived from the original on 2 April 2015.
- Lander, Bonnie (1 July 2008). "Interpreting the Person: Tradition, Conflict, and Cymbeline's Imogen". Shakespeare Quarterly. 59 (2): 156–184. doi:10.1353/shq.0.0005. ISSN 0037-3222. S2CID 144140678.
- Leiter, Samuel (1986). Shakespeare Around the Globe: A Guide to Notable Postwar Revivals. New York: Greenwood Press. ISBN 978-0-313-23756-0.
- Lesnick, Silas (12 August 2013). "Anton Yelchin and Dakota Johnson Board Cymbeline". ComingSoon.net. Archived from the original on 15 August 2013.
- "Long Pond Show". hudsonshakespeare.org.
- Marks, Peter (17 August 1998). "THEATER REVIEW; Fairy-Tale Plottings of a British Royal Family". The New York Times.
- "The Marlowe Society Presents Cymbeline". camdram.net.
- Matzke, Christine (2013). "Performing the Nation at the London Globe – Notes on a South Sudanese Cymbeline 'We will be like other people in other places'". In Plastow, Jane; Banham, Martin (eds.). African Theatre 12: Shakespeare in and out of Africa. Boydell & Brewer.
- "Melly Still 2016 Production". Royal Shakespeare Company. 2016.
- Miller-Tomlinson, Tracey (29 April 2015). "Queer History in Cymbeline". Shakespeare. 12 (3): 225–240. doi:10.1080/17450918.2015.1033450. ISSN 1745-0918. S2CID 145212402.
- Muir, Kenneth (1961). Last Periods of Shakespeare, Racine, Ibsen. Detroit: Wayne State University Press.
- Odell, George C.D. (1920). Shakespeare from Betterton to Irving. Vol. 2. New York: Scribner.
- "Oregon Shakespeare Festival".
- Ouzounian, Richard (1 June 2012). "Theatre Review: Stratford's Cymbeline a solid success". thestar.com. Archived from the original on 22 April 2019.
- Parolin, Peter A. (1 January 2002). "Anachronistic Italy: Cultural Alliances and National Identity in Cymbeline". Shakespeare Studies: 188. ISSN 0582-9399. Archived from the original on 25 April 2019 – via Questia.
- Pollock, Frederick, ed. (1875). Macready's Reminiscences and Selections from His Diaries and Letters. New York: Macmillan.
- Patalay, Ajesh (30 August 2008). "Tom Hiddleston: Not just a Romeo". Telegraph.co.uk. Archived from the original on 12 January 2022.
- Patten, Dominic (7 August 2013). "Penn Badgley Added To Shakespeare Adaptation 'Cymbeline'". Deadline Hollywood.
- Patten, Dominic (8 August 2013). "'Resident Evil's Milla Jovovich Joins Shakespeare Modernization 'Cymbeline'". Deadline Hollywood.
- Potter, Lois (2002). "The 2001 Globe Season: Celts and Greenery". Shakespeare Quarterly. 53 (1). Johns Hopkins University Press: 95–105. doi:10.1353/shq.2002.0013. S2CID 192075291.
- "Secrets of Cymbeline". the neat-herd's daughter. 18 October 2013.
- Sedgwick, Eve Kosofsky (1993). Tendencies. Durham: Duke University Press.
- Speaight, Robert (1974). "Shakespeare in Britain, 1974". Shakespeare Quarterly. 25 (4). Oxford University Press: 389–394. doi:10.2307/2868939. JSTOR 2868939.
- Strachey, Lytton (1922). Books and Characters. New York: Harcourt, Brace.
- "Stratford Cymbeline Production".
- Thompson, Ann (2001). "Person and Office: the Case of Imogen, Princess of Britain". In Newey, Vincent; Thompson, Ann (eds.). Literature and Nationalism. UK: Liverpool University Press.
- Traub, Valerie (2002). The Renaissance of Lesbianism in Early Modern England. Cambridge: Cambridge University Press.
- Trewin, J.C. (1964). Shakespeare on the English Stage, 1909–1964. London: Barrie Rocklith.
- Trueman, Matt (4 May 2012). "Cymbeline – review". The Guardian. ISSN 0261-3077. Archived from the original on 25 April 2019.
- Tutton, Mark (12 January 2012). "All the world's a stage as Shakespeare goes to South Sudan". CNN.
- Wayne, Valerie (2005). "Cymbeline: Patriotism and Performance". In Dutton, Richard; Howard, Jean E. (eds.). A Companion to Shakespeare's Works: The Poems, Problem Comedies, Late Plays. Vol. 4. Blackwell Publishing. pp. 389–407. doi:10.1002/9780470996560.ch21. ISBN 978-0-470-99656-0.
- White, Martin (1998). Renaissance Drama in Action. London: Routledge.
- Wilson-Lee, Edward (2016). Shakespeare in Swahililand. Farrar, Straus, and Giroux. ISBN 978-0-374-26207-5.
- Wyver, John (28 December 2011). "Comparing scenes from Cymbeline (BBC, 1937 and 1956)". SCREEN PLAYS.
- Wyver, John (12 November 2011). "In the beginning: scenes from Cymbeline (BBC, 1937)". SCREEN PLAYS.
- Wyver, John (20 November 2011). "More scenes from Cymbeline (BBC, 1956)". Screen Plays.
- Yajnik, Ramanlal Kanaiyala (1933). The Indian Theatre. Unwin Brothers.
- Ziegler, Georgianna (1 March 1990). "My lady's chamber: Female space, female chastity in Shakespeare". Textual Practice. 4 (1): 73–90. doi:10.1080/09502369008582077. ISSN 0950-236X.
