= Milnes Levick =

English comedian and actor (1825 to 1897)

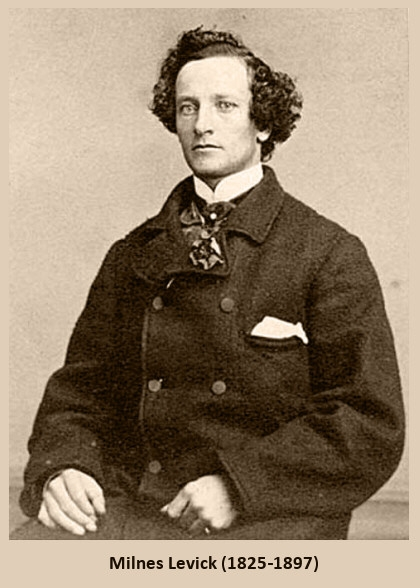
Levick was one of the most famous Shakespearean actors in the US in the latter half of the nineteenth century.

Milnes Levick (January 30, 1825 – April 18, 1897) was an English comedian and actor who left England in 1853. His work in the United States gained him recognition as a Shakespearean actor, particularly for his portrayal of Julius Caesar, Mercutio and Macbeth.

== Biography ==
Born in Boston, Lincolnshire, Levick left England at the age of 28 and achieved career success in the United States. He performed in numerous productions, particularly Shakespeare's plays. He died of cancer in 1897 after more than fifty years on the stage, mostly as the leading man to some of theatre's most prominent names of the late 19th century. Levick became a United States citizen on October 14, 1861.

== Early career ==
Levick began his career in his home town in England at the Boston Dramatic Company in 1844, or perhaps even earlier. A newspaper article dated January 3rd 1845 recorded an indictment against Milnes Levick and his fellow actors for creating a nuisance, "by firing off guns & pistols and making loud noises late at night in the performance of plays, etc." This being the earliest record of his career onstage.

In 1846 he and his fellow actors wrote to The Era (newspaper) complaining that they had not been paid for their services. The newspaper published their complaint and the response of the theatre owner, a Mr Daniels. In the latter half of 1848 Levick was living in Kingston upon Hull with his wife and daughter, where he was working on stage. His second daughter was born there on August 19th 1848 and her birth certificate records her father's profession as a performer. In 1851 he appeared onstage in Scarborough and Sunderland. On January 1, 1852 he appeared at the Theatre Royal, Sunderland in Macbeth, The Teacher Taught and The Tipperary Legacy. In July of that year he received a positive review for his performance in Leap Year at the Theatre Royal in Scarborough. Four months later, he was on stage at the newly reopened North Shields theatre. In September 1853, he received a positive review for his performance at the Theatre Royal in Scarborough. In November, the New Theatre Royal in North Shields announced its opening season, and at the same time informed the public that Levick had left the country.

Initially a comedian, Levick had graduated to acting but achieved little recognition until he arrived in New York. In late 1853 he appeared as Alfred Highflyer in A Roland for an Oliver at the Old Broadway Theatre. He was then cast as George Harris in Uncle Tom's Cabin at P. T. Barnum's American Museum on December 6, 1853, replacing Corson W. Clarke. This Tom show was one of the earliest performances of Harriet Beecher Stowe's book, which had been running for a month when Levick joined the cast, and where he initially gained recognition in the US.

After four years at Barnum's museum, he joined Laura Keene when she opened her own theatre. His first appearance with Laura Keene's company was in Blanche of Brandywine which ran from April 22nd to May 12th 1858. He then appeared as Fag in The Rivals on September 6th 1858, followed by the role of Trip in School for Scandal which included eight acknowledged stars in its cast. On October 4th he appeared in London Assurance, before Our American Cousin was played for the first time on October 18th. There he established a reputation in the role of Lt. Harry Vernon (of the Royal Navy) in "the most successful comedy produced in the US for many years", to quote Thomas Allston Brown. Levick's second wife (born Emily Sagon Page) also appeared with him as Skillet. The run eventually ended on April 15th 1859. It was revived on January 9th 1862 when Levick replaced E. A. Sothern in the role of Lord Dundreary. On May 4th 1863, Laura Keene starred in Tib, or Our Cat in Crinoline, one of several plays Levick wrote, which marked the closure of the season, as well as Laura Keene's management of the theatre on May 8th 1863.

The following is a quotation from Thomas Allston Brown's A History of the New York Stage from the First Performance in 1732 to 1901 in which he refers to Levick's early years on stage:

Milnes Levick appeared here (the Old Broadway Theatre) as Alfred Highflyer in "A Roland for an Oliver." He was afterward engaged for Barnum's Museum, making his debut as George Harris in Uncle Tom's Cabin, where he continued to act for the four succeeding years, and during that time wrote two plays - "The Limekiln Man" and "Sybil's cave" - which were both played here, achieving success. He was next engaged by Laura Keene, and after Sothern, who had made his first success as Lord Dundreary, left that theatre, Mr Levick appeared in that character. He afterwards travelled with Miss Keene for two years, filling the positions of leading man and stage manager. He was then re-engaged at Barnum's Museum and afterwards went to Chicago, Ill., for a season; Mr Barnum again sent for him, and engaged him as stage manager and leading man. During that season he wrote and produced another play entitled "Pale Janet." The burning of the Museum threw him out of employment, and he retired to his farm at Wilton, in Westchester County, New York, where he remained for two years. He was especially engaged to support Chas. Fechter at Niblo's Garden, during his first engagement in America, and was seen as the King in Hamlet.

Another actor in Keene's company was Edwin Booth, the older brother of John Wilkes Booth. Their father, Junius, was considered the most prominent actor in the US in the first half of the nineteenth century, and Edwin became equally famous. John Wilkes Booth (who had been a member of Keene's company) was widely acknowledged for his Shakespearean roles and was one of the highest paid actors in the US before he shot and killed Abraham Lincoln on April 14, 1865. The president and his wife were watching Keene's final performance as Florence Trenchard in Our American Cousin, a play they had previously seen when Levick was part of the original cast. Keene had arranged the show for that evening at Ford's Theatre and invited Lincoln as she knew it was one of his favorites. After Lincoln died, Keene and some of her fellow actors were temporarily arrested as possible co-conspirators.

Keene had toured Australia with Edwin Booth, and both appeared on stage with Levick on many occasions between 1858 and 1863. Later, Edwin established his own Booth's Theatre, and Levick performed there frequently in leading roles. Levick was also instrumental in the discovery of Mary Anderson, who rose to fame in the US and Europe as a leading lady. In 1876 he was performing in Louisville, Kentucky, to an almost empty house when the then-unknown Anderson approached the manager of Macauley's Theatre and asked to play Juliet in Romeo and Juliet. The manager was desperate enough that he convinced Levick and his company of actors to immediately rehearse for a performance two days later. She later thanked Levick, and said he was the only one to support and encourage her. They remained friends to the end of his life.

== Later career ==
Levick served as stage manager and leading man during his time at Barnum's New Museum in the season beginning September 1867 where he appeared on stage with Corson W. Clarke just prior to his death on September 22nd of that year. Clarke was a veteran with 30 years experience at the National Theatre, Park Theatre and the Bowery Theatre. Levick's career received a major boost with the discovery of Mary Anderson (actress, born 1859) in Louisville, Kentucky in 1876. He was Anderson's leading man for several years, ending in June 1881 when he became leading man in Edwin Booth's theatre. During his time with Mary Anderson and Edwin Booth he built a solid reputation as a Shakesperian actor. As a mark of appreciation, Mary Anderson presented him with her portrait, on the back of which she had written, "To the best Master Walter that ever trod the stage".

Levick performed leading parts in productions with the most famous actors of the time, including:

- Geneviève Ward in Jane Shore.
- Edward Loomis Davenport in Hamlet.
- Mary Shaw (actress) in As You Like It.
- Ernesto Rossi, supporting his 1881-82 tour of the US.
- Charlotte Cushman in Macbeth, Henry VIII, and Simpson & Co..
- Minna Gale in The Hunchback.
- Fanny Janauschek, in Chesney Wold and Henry VIII.
- Margaret Mather, in Romeo and Juliet and Leah.
- Julia Marlowe, in Ingomar, As You Like It, Twelfth Night, The Hunchback, Pygmalion and Galatea.
- Edwin Booth, in The Merchant of Venice, Hamlet, and As You Like It.
- Mary Anderson (actress, born 1859) - Levick was the leading man in her company of actors, and appeared in Romeo and Juliet, The Hunchback, Evadne, Ingomar, The Lady of Lyons, Love, and Fazio, among others.
- Joseph Jefferson in Our American Cousin and Blanche of Brandywine (April 1858).
- Edward Askew Sothern in Our American Cousin. Levick took over the role of Lord Dundreary in 1862 when Sothern left Laura Keene's company to tour Europe. Again in 1866 at Barnum's New Museum he revived the role.
- Charles Walter Couldock in Our American Cousin and As You Like It (May 1887 benefit performance).
- Charles Fechter in Hamlet at Niblo's Garden in 1870.

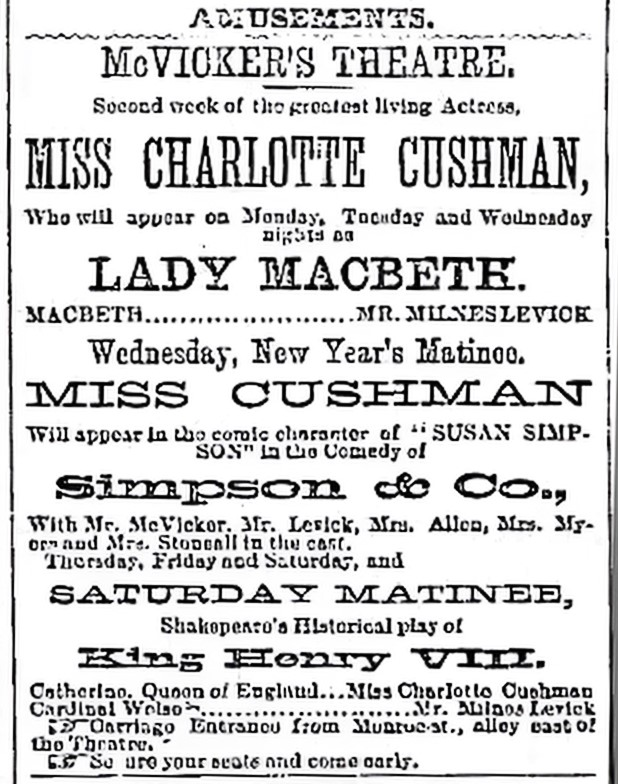
List of plays at the McVicker's Theater in December 1872

- Dion Boucicault in Jeannie Deans and The Colleen Bawn.
- John McCullough (actor) in Richelieu and Romeo & Juliet November 2nd 1874 playbill.
- Charles Melton Walcot Jr. in She Stoops to Conquer.
- Barney Williams (actor) in The Emerald Ring at Niblo's Garden March 18th 1870.
- Walter Montgomery (actor) in Hamlet and As You Like It at Niblo's Garden November 28th 1870.

Levick performed in a new drama at Barnum's Museum on January 23, 1865 called The Union Prisoner, or The Patriot's Daughter, which he had written. On July 13, 1865, the Barnum's Museum building was destroyed by fire resulting in Milnes becoming temporarily unemployed. In 1866 he presented his play The Union Prisoner many times in Chicago before returning to New York. On September 3rd 1866 Levick headed up a new dramatic company at Barnum's New Museum, where he was also the stage manager. His plays Pale Janet and The Union Prisoner were performed there and he resurrected his role as Lord Dundreary in Our American Cousin. He also wrote and appeared in The Limekiln Man and Sybil's Cave (first performed at Barnum's Museum on June 22nd 1857) which met with some success. On March 3rd 1868 this building also caught fire and was also destroyed. Levick had earlier written Tib, or Our Cat in Crinoline for Laura Keene, in which she played the leading role when it opened on May 4th 1863, which was also her last performance with the theatre under her management.

Levick was probably best known for his portrayal of Julius Caesar at Booth's Theatre. He was also a leading member of the Union Square Theatre company and played leading parts in several Bartley Campbell dramas. Campbell also once said of Levick's adopted son Gus, that he could "bring a curtain down better than any darned actor in America".

The press often states that Levick's final appearance on stage was in 1892 at the Star Theatre, where he appeared as Walter in The Hunchback, supporting Minna Gale. However, he appeared on stage several times in 1896 and was still offering his services via newspapers only three months before his death.

== Personal life ==
Milnes Levick was named after his mother Eleanor Milnes, who married his father, George Levick, on September 5, 1815, at All Saints' Church, Babworth in Nottinghamshire. George was an innkeeper and lived in Retford, Nottinghamshire after marrying Eleanor, who had six sisters and four brothers. Their first two children were born in Retford before moving to Boston, Lincolnshire, Milnes' birthplace, around 1818. Milnes had two older siblings, George, who was baptised at St Michael the Archangel's Church, Retford on March 16, 1817, and Maria, who was baptised at St Botolph's Church, Boston on December 27, 1821. Milnes had five younger siblings, two brothers and three sisters, named Ina, James, Charlotte, Matilda and Henry. Eleanor had a total of sixteen children but eight died while still infants.

On his marriage certificate dated March 27, 1845, Milnes was described as a "hatter". He married Matilda Flint, who at 26 was six years older than him. Together they had three daughters, all of whom died in childhood. His first child, named Eleanor Matilda after his mother and either his wife or younger sister, was born May 1, 1846, in Boston, Lincolnshire and died July 27, 1855, in Scarborough, North Yorkshire. Her birth was registered by Milnes on May 7, 1846, when he stated his address as High Street, Boston and his occupation was still described as a "hatter". His second child Ina Charlotte, named after two of his younger sisters was born in Kingston upon Hull, Yorkshire in the last quarter of 1848 and died there on December 29 the same year. His third child Emily Jane, who appears to have been named after his mistress, was born on July 25, 1851, in Scarborough, North Yorkshire and died on January 26, 1853, in Tynemouth, Northumberland.

Milnes also had an illegitimate son, born secretly in London to his mistress on March 22, 1852, the daughter of a prominent Yorkshire solicitor, William Sagon Page (1792 to 1854). Milnes registered the birth in the London sub district of Hanover Square, Westminster as Gustavus Richard Craven Milne, stating his own name as Levick Milne and the boy's mother as Emily Sagon Milne, formerly Page. He gave their address as 9, Mount Street, Grosvenor Square, which was the home of Emily's brother, Alfred Richard Sagon Page, a solicitor. Gustavus died at the age of five on June 5, 1857, in Brooklyn, New York.

Eighteen months after Emily gave birth to Gustavus (presumably named after Gustavus Vaughan Brooke), they arrived in New York to begin a new life. Milnes bigamously married Emily on February 27, 1854, less than six months after arriving in New York. They adopted a baby boy named George who was born eleven days after their marriage. Milnes once stated that he adopted the child because he was "the son of a very good friend", but provided no more details. About a year after Milnes, Emily and their baby Gustavus arrived in the US, Milnes parents, George and Eleanor Levick, together with Milnes' younger brother James, joined him. Milne's father acted as his agent for several years but developed dementia in the late 1860s and died on January 21, 1873.

When their biological son died, Milnes and Emily switched the identity of their adopted child (whose parents were English according to census records) with that of their deceased son, and at the age of three, George became Gustavus Richard Levick, growing up to be known as Gus Levick (March 10, 1854, to July 8, 1909). Gus also established himself as a well known actor and first appeared on stage with his father on March 12, 1874, as Cromwell in Henry VIII at Booth's Theatre. Gus married Ada Bartling, better known under her stage name Ada Levick.

== Published interviews ==
Many of Milnes Levick's contemporaries toured Europe once they had built a reputation in the US, but this wasn't an option for Milnes as his hasty departure from England had been reported harshly in the press. The Era (newspaper) of November 13th 1853 reported, "Mr Milnes Levick has, we are given to understand, left this country, deserting his wife and child, and leaving them in the most destitute condition". Milnes daughter Eleanor died less than two years after he left England and his wife Matilda worked as a servant in private residences for almost 40 years until her death in early 1891.

Obviously Milnes wanted to distance himself from his rather dark past and an example is an interview he appeared to give to The Albany Argus on March 23rd 1879. By this time his parents and his second wife Emily were all dead, so he clearly felt at liberty to create a rather amusing picture of his early life. There are aspects of his story that have parallels with reality, for example a young lady from England did visit him but she was his niece, not his sister. She was four years old when Milnes left England and probably remembered him very well. Of course, Milnes did not run away from home, he arrived in the US in the fall of 1853, not 1851 and his father was not the "Reverent Milton Levick", nor was Milnes the sixteenth of twenty-one children. He was actually the seventh of sixteen, but only seven of his siblings survived infancy. In 1850 he wasn't sixteen, he was twenty-five - married with a daughter aged four and had already experienced the death of another daughter. It is surprising that he refers to his second wife as Mary, since Emily had appeared on stage with him in Our American Cousin, so many readers in the world of theatre would have recognised this story as Milne's idea of a joke, after all, he was a comedian. It seems this may not have been an interview, but a piece written by Milnes to amuse his audience. It also perhaps attempted to answer why he had not pursued opportunities in Europe. Milnes remained in the US working on stage for the next thirteen years, evidence that the intent expressed in the article was entirely false.

On another occasion Milnes was interviewed by Octavus Cohen in New York regarding the discovery of Mary Anderson. The article was published in the Steubenville Daily Herald February 13th 1896 and other newspapers just over a year before he died. It also appeared in the Daily Mail in London on July 28th 1896. This interesting article provides a much clearer view of Mary Anderson as a sixteen year old girl, as well as an insight into Milnes' personality.

== Obituary ==
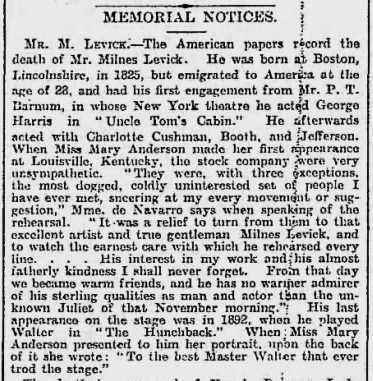
Milnes Levick's Obituary in The Guardian

Despite having left England forty five years before his death, his obituary appeared in at least two English newspapers,The Guardian and The Stage. Many US and Canadian newspapers carried the news of his death with several mentioning his prominent roles and co-stars. At least two mentioned that he died a wealthy man, but this was due less to his earnings on stage than his property investments. The bulk of his estate was left to his adopted son Gus Levick, who ended his own stage career just a couple of years before inheriting his father's wealth.

Tributes paid in his obituaries were very generous, such as the following:

- Milnes Levick, one of the cleverest actors ever seen on the American stage, died yesterday morning at his home in East 138th Street where he had lived for thirty-four years.
- A close Shakesperean student, a conscientious worker, an actor of wide and varied experience, an upright man and a loyal friend, he will be sadly missed.
- Milnes Levick, one of the oldest and best actors on the American stage, died in NY on Sunday in his 73d year.
- The actor who claimed national fame as Julius Caesar.
- He is well remembered as the Julius Caesar in Jarrett & Palmer's famous production of Shakespeare's tragedy at Booth's Theatre
