= Imogen (Cymbeline) =

Character in Cymbeline

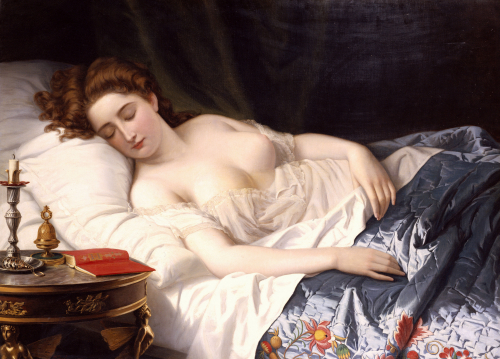
Imogen in her bed-chamber where Iachimo witnesses the mole under her breast. Illustrated by Wilhelm Ferdinand Souchon in 1872

Imogen (also spelled Innogen) is the daughter of King Cymbeline in Shakespeare's play Cymbeline. She was described by William Hazlitt as "perhaps the most tender and the most artless" of all Shakespeare's women.

== Name ==
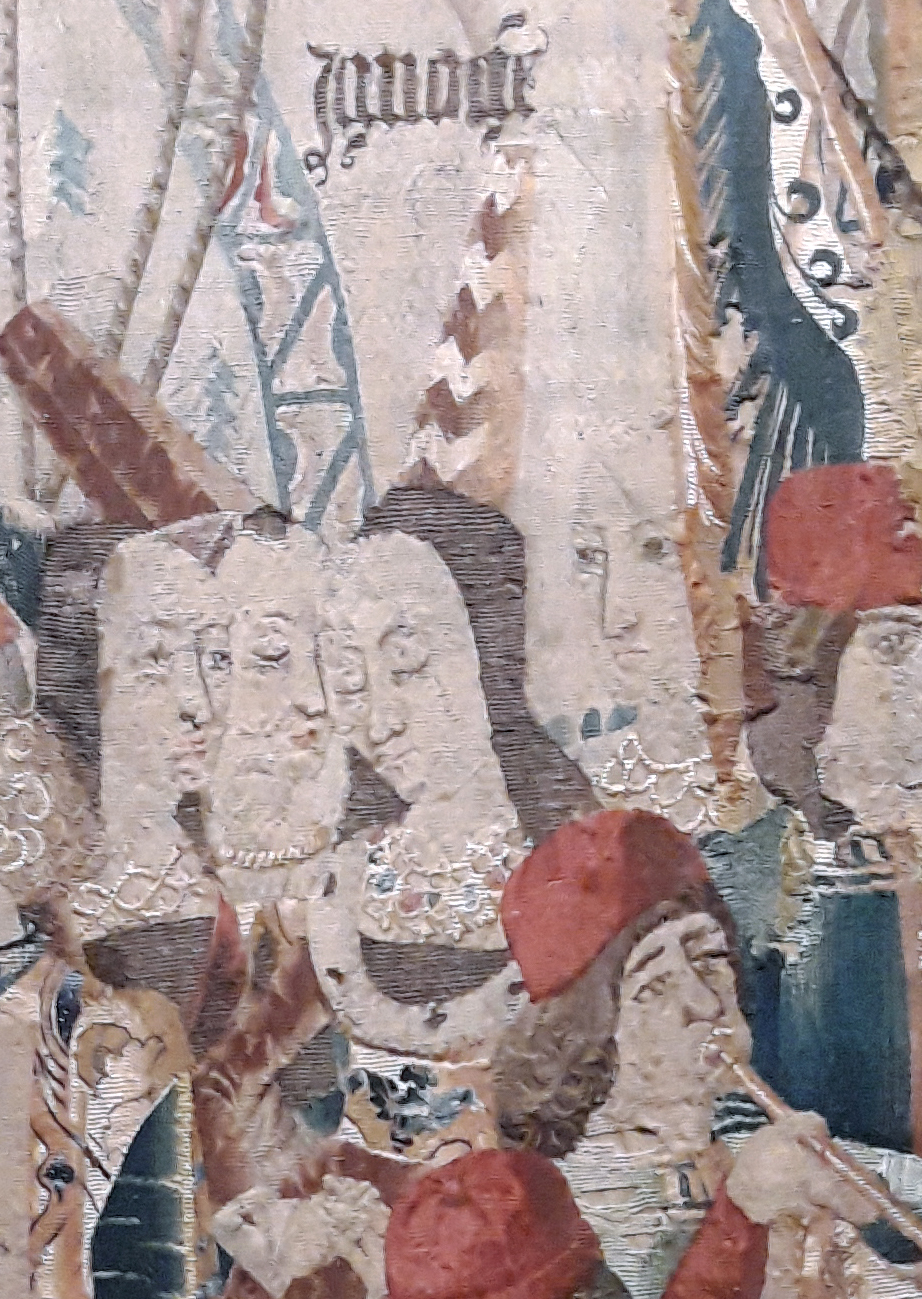
Innogen depicted (abbreviated as Innogẽ) on a 15th-century tapestry depicting Brutus of Troy's voyage to Aquitania.

Academic consensus suggests that Shakespeare named the character Innogen, and the spelling "Imogen" is an error which arose when the manuscripts were first committed to print. Shakespeare probably took the name from the Matter of Britain character Innogen as found in Holinshed's Chronicles (1577), and had used the name once before for a non-speaking 'ghost character' in early editions of Much Ado About Nothing (1600), as the wife of the character Leonato (Imogen in Cymbeline is paired with a character with the similar epithet "Leonatus"). An early description of Cymbeline by Simon Forman in 1611 consistently spells Imogen's name as "Innogen", leading scholars to conclude that the spelling of the character's name as "Imogen" in the 1623 First Folio appears to have been a result of "scribal or compositorial error". As a result, some modern editions of Shakespeare's plays, notably the 1986 Oxford Edition, correct the name to Innogen.

== Actions in the play ==
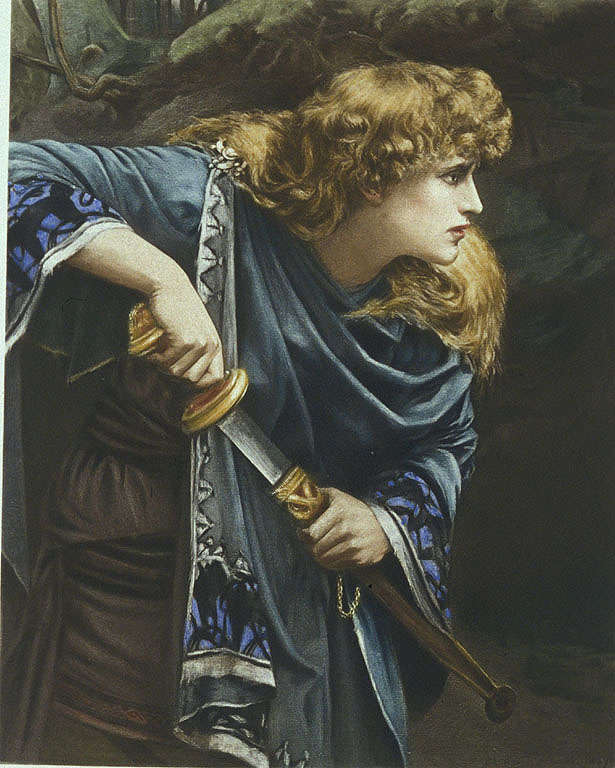
Imogen by Herbert Gustave Schmalz

Imogen is princess of Britain, and the virtuous wife of the exiled Posthumus, whose praise of her moral purity incites Posthumus's acquaintance Iachimo to bet Posthumus that he can seduce her. When he fails, Iachimo hides in her bedchamber and uncovers her body while she sleeps, observing details of a mole on her breast which he then describes to Posthumus as proof that he had slept with her. Posthumus plots to kill his wife, but the designated killer reveals the plot to Imogen and advises her to hide; she escapes to the woods dressed as a man and falls in with a family who helps her. Taking a drug, she falls into a coma and is presumed dead by the family, who cover her body and sing a song over her. When she wakes she finds the headless body of Cloten, a brutish character who had planned to rape her while wearing Posthumus's clothes, but had been killed in a fight with one of the men who took her in. She mistakes the headless body for that of her husband. After the battle at the climax of the play she confronts Iachimo who confesses his lies. She is reunited with Posthumus, and her father (King Cymbeline), and discovers two of the men who took her in are actually her long lost brothers.

== Artistic allusions ==
Oscar Wilde alludes to Imogen in The Picture of Dorian Gray when Dorian describes Sibyl Vane, the actress he is infatuated with.

'It must be, if you say it. And now I am off. Imogen is waiting for me. Don't forget about tomorrow. Good-bye.'(Ch. IV)

Stephen Dedalus alludes to Imogen in Ulysses, referring to the episode in which Iachomo observes the mole on her breast: "Ravisher and ravished, what he would, but would not, go with him from Lucrece's bluecircled ivory globes to Imogen's breast, bare, with its mole cinquespotted."

E. M. Forster alludes to Imogen in Where Angels Fear to Tread when describing Lilia's sadness in her marriage: "Not Cordelia nor Imogen more deserves our tears."

A character in Anthony Trollope's Barchester Towers mentions Imogen: "Imogen was true, but how was she rewarded? Her lord believed her to be the paramour of the first he who came near her in his absence."

John Keats, a great admirer of Shakespeare, in a famous letter to Richard Woodhouse, contrasts Imogen to one of Shakespeare's most notoriously immoral characters, Iago, in order to describe the character of the poet: "The poetical character has no self—it is everything and nothing—it has no character and enjoys light and shade; it lives in gusto, be it foul or fair, high or low, rich or poor, mean or elevated—it has as much delight in conceiving an Iago as an Imogen. What shocks the virtuous philosopher delights the chameleon poet... A poet is the most unpoetical of anything in existence because he has no identity, he is continually filling some other body."

Imogen is also alluded to in Nathaniel Hawthorne's short story "The Antique Ring": "Or, who knows, but it is the very ring which Posthumus received from Imogen?"

In George Bernard Shaw's rewrite of the last act of Cymbeline, Cymbeline Refinished, Imogen becomes a much more assertive figure in line with Shaw's feminist views. She continually questions both Iachimo and Postumus at the end, refusing to forgive them before finally saying that she will "go home and make the best of it, as other women must".

In the Disney+ TV series The Veil (2024), the main character played by Elisabeth Moss, a secret agent keen on Shakespeare’s work, names herself Imogen for the time of her mission.
