= Frank Levick =

English footballer

Frank Levick (1882 – 1 February 1908) was an English footballer who played for Sheffield United, mostly at inside left, during the 1907–08 season. He had previously played for Rotherham Town and Tinsley.

Born in Eckington, Levick made his debut for Sheffield United on 21 September 1907 against Manchester United at Bank Street. He broke his collar bone while playing against Newcastle United on New Year's Day 1908. While recovering from the injury, he contracted a cold which developed into pneumonia. He died of heart failure as a result of pneumonia, on 1 February 1908 in Sheffield.
