= Derek Levick =

English cricketer

Personal information
- Full name: Deryck Cyril Levick
- Born: 27 May 1929; Ealing, Middlesex, England
- Died: July 2004 (aged 74–75); Barking, London, England
- Batting: Right-handed

Domestic team information
- Years: Team
- 1950–1951: Essex

Career statistics
| Competition | First-class |
|---|---|
| Matches | 3 |
| Runs scored | 14 |
| Batting average | 2.33 |
| 100s/50s | –/– |
| Top score | 6 |
| Balls bowled | – |
| Wickets | – |
| Bowling average | – |
| 5 wickets in innings | – |
| 10 wickets in match | – |
| Best bowling | – |
| Catches/stumpings | 1/– |
- Source: Cricinfo, 24 January 2011

Deryck Cyril Levick (27 May 1929 – July 2004) was an English cricketer. Levick was a right-handed batsman. He was born at Ealing, Middlesex, son of Robert and Emily Barratt.

Levick made his first-class debut for Essex against Leicestershire in the 1950 County Championship. He played 2 further first-class fixtures the following season against Warwickshire and Yorkshire, marking his final first-class representation for the county. Levick failed to capitalise on 3 opportunities at first-class level, scoring just 14 runs in his 3 matches at a batting average of 2.33 and a high score of 6.

He died in Barking, London in July 2004.
