= Wilhelm Ferdinand Souchon =

German painter (1825–1876)

Wilhelm Ferdinand Souchon (1825–1876) was a German painter.

== Life ==
Wilhelm Ferdinand Souchon was born in Halberstadt on 17 January 1825, and was of Huguenot descent. He was a pupil of August Rémy in Berlin, and furthered his studies in Munich (1849–1851) and Rome (1851–1854). He was a painter of religious and historical subjects and portraits. He did paintings for churches. He died in Weimar on 26 October 1876, aged 50.

== Gallery ==
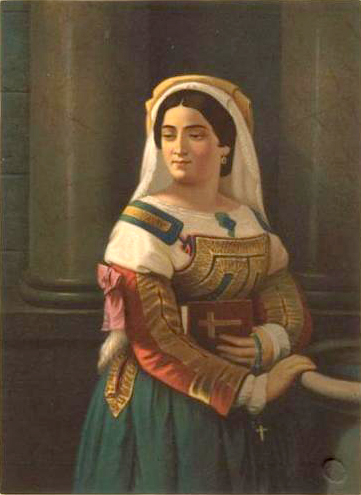
Mädchen aus Cerbera (1861)

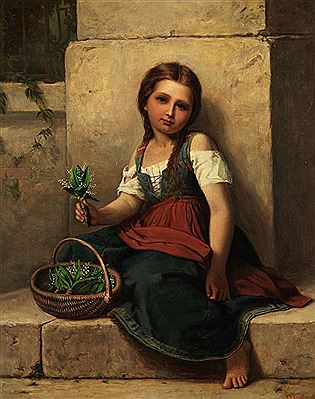
Kleine Maiglöckchenverkäuferin (1871)

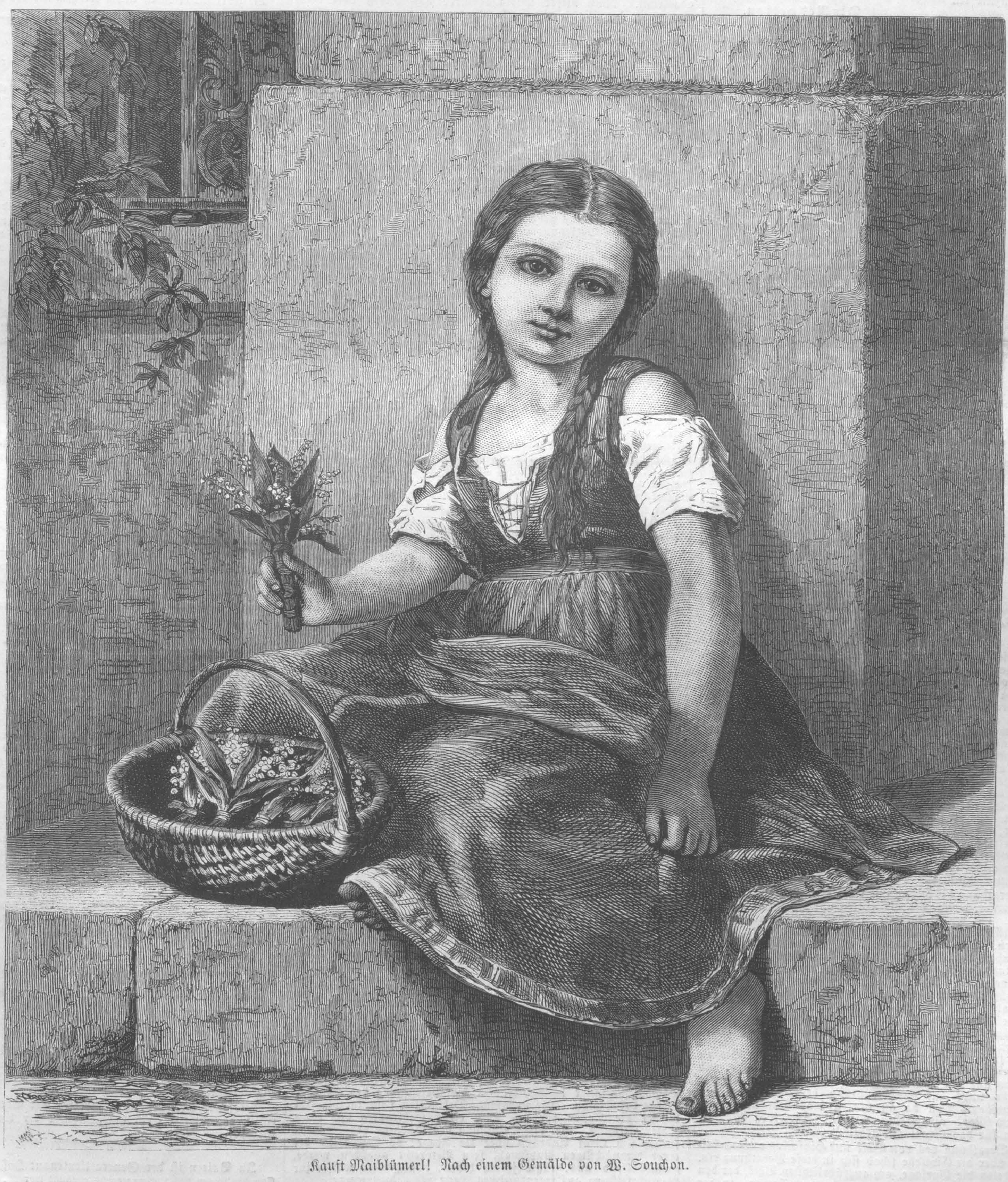
Leipziger Illustrirte Zeitung, no. 1557 (3 May 1873)

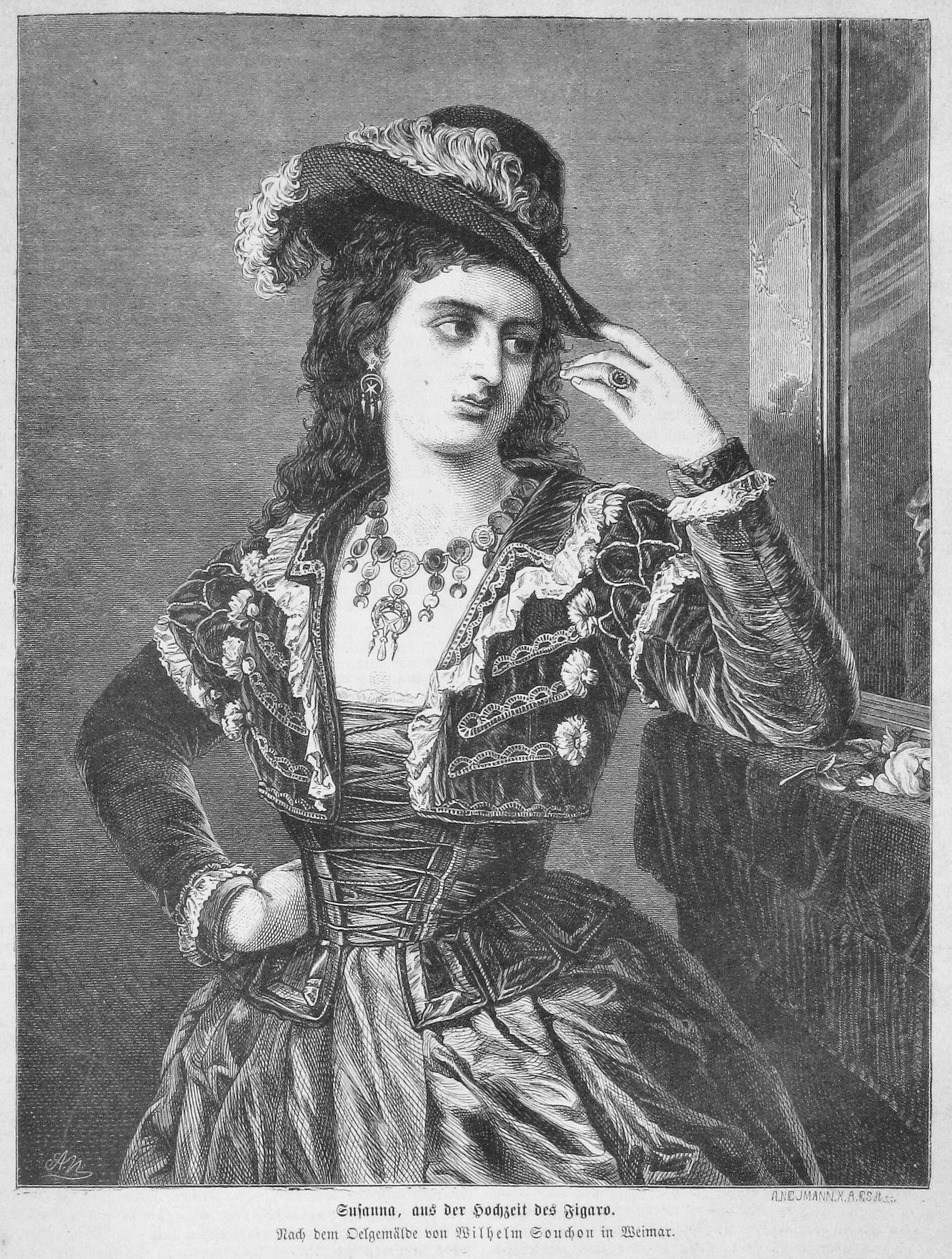
Die Gartenlaube (1873)

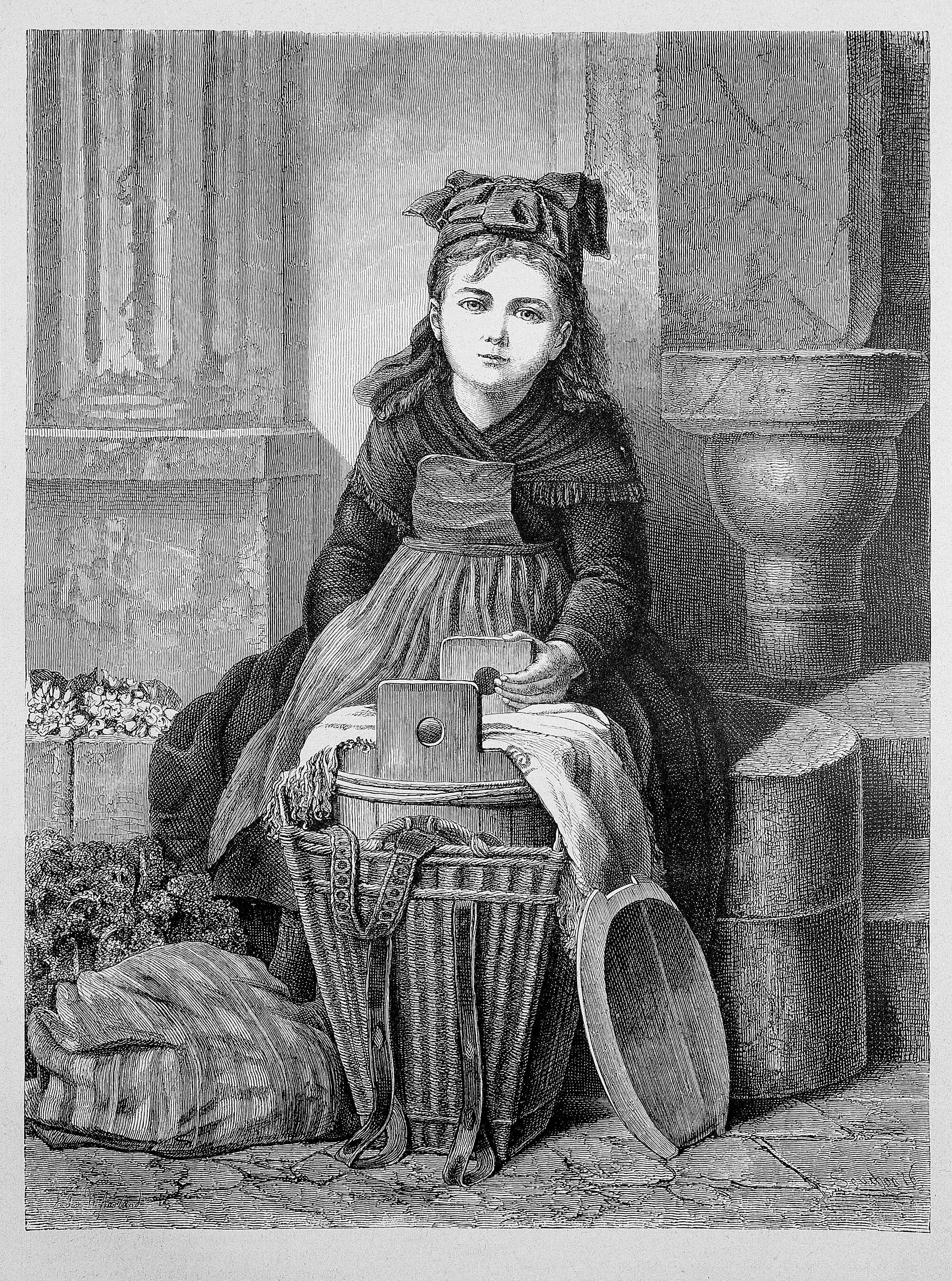
Die Gartenlaube (1878)

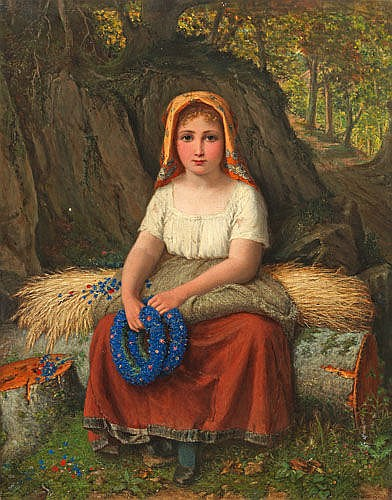
Rastendes Bauernmädchen (1875)

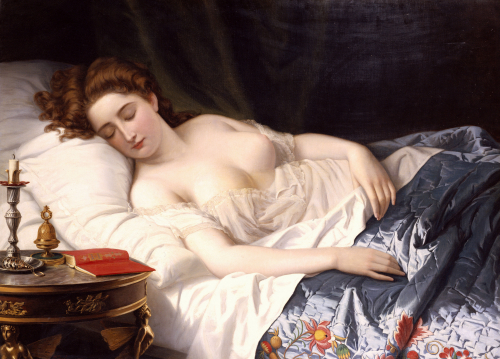
Imogen (1872)

== Sources ==
- Beyer, Andreas; Savoy, Bénédicte; Tegethoff, Wolf, eds. "Souchon, Wilhelm Ferdinand". In Allgemeines Künstlerlexikon - Internationale Künstlerdatenbank - Online. Berlin, New York: K. G. Saur. Retrieved 9 October 2022.
- "Souchon, Wilhelm Ferdinand". Benezit Dictionary of Artists. 2011. Oxford Art Online. Retrieved 7 October 2022.
