= Oliver Levick =

English footballer

Personal information
- Full name: Oliver Levick
- Date of birth: 13 June 1899
- Place of birth: Aston, Yorkshire, England
- Date of death: 1965 (age 65)
- Place of death: Sheffield, West Riding of Yorkshire
- Height: 6 ft 0 in (1.83 m)
- Position: Half-back

Senior career*
| Years | Team | Apps | (Gls) |
| –1920 | Woodhouse | | |
| 1920–1926 | Sheffield Wednesday | 21 | (0) |
| 1926–1927 | Stockport County | 5 | (0) |
| 1927–1928 | York City | 41 | (1) |
| 1928– | Boston United | | |
| Total | | 67 | (1) |
- * Club domestic league appearances and goals

Oliver Levick (13 June 1899 – 1965) was an English professional footballer who played as a half-back in the Football League for Sheffield Wednesday and Stockport County and in non-League football for Woodhouse, York City and Boston United.
