= Ada Levick =

American actress (1852–1908)

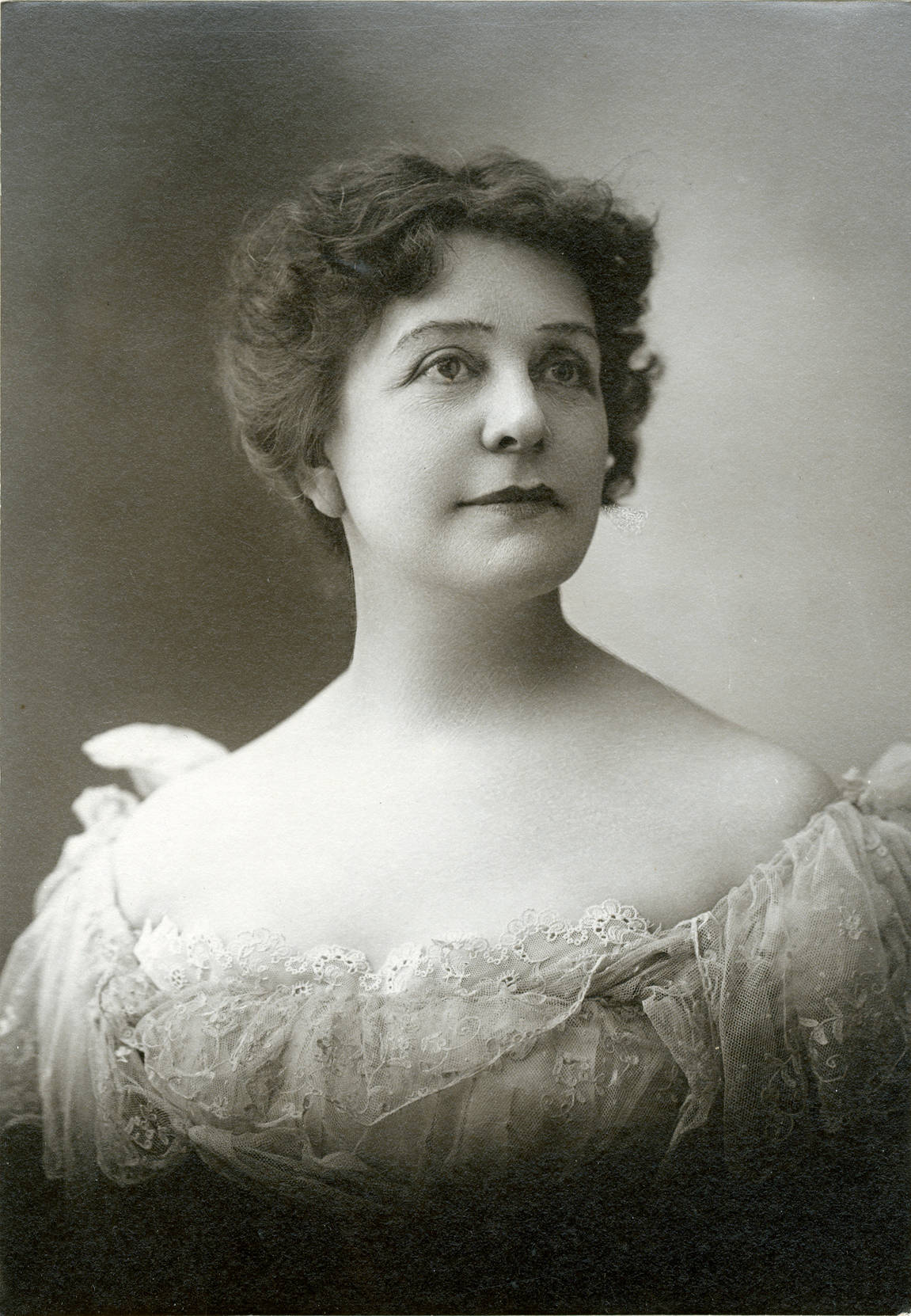
- Levick pictured in 1904
- Born: Ada Bartling; March 10, 1852
- Died: June 22, 1908 (aged 56); Frankfort, Indiana, U.S.
- Occupation: Actress
- Spouse: Gustavus Levick (m. 1884–1895)

Ada Levick (née Bartling; March 10, 1852 – June 22, 1908) was an American stage actress. Originally from Topeka, she moved to San Francisco where she lived until her death in 1908, aged 56.

== Early life ==
Ada Levick was born Ada Ella Bartling on March 10, 1852. She grew up in Topeka, Kansas and developed an early passion for the stage through frequent participation in amateur theater. She was educated at the College of the Sisters of Bethany. Her father, Major Henry Bartling, served as the Mayor of Topeka in 1873.

== Career ==
Pursuing a career in acting, she adopted the stage name "Ada Wallace". When asked why she chose the profession, she remarked: "I thought that if I were ever going to do anything for myself that I had better begin, and my inclination pointed to the stage, and so here I am". In 1875, she appeared in the play Bread on the Waters with her drama company, where she was credited under her birth name, Ada Bartling. Her performance was met with praise for its poise and professionalism.

On January 2, 1883, the play Moths, adapted from Ouida's novel, was performed at Crawford's Opera House in Topeka, Kansas, by a prominent dramatic company with which Levick was a member of the cast. As a native of Topeka, the performance was presented as a complimentary benefit in her honor and anticipated a high attendance. Later that year, in August, she returned to Topeka with her company, at which time The Topeka Daily Capital described her as "winning for herself a most enviable reputation in the profession". In 1904, she played the part of Queen Elizabeth I in Dorothy Vernon of Haddon Hall.

Her final stage appearance was the leading part in The Lion and the Mouse.

== Personal life ==
She married fellow actor Gustavus Levick, adopted son of Milnes Levick, in a quiet ceremony in Jersey City on September 8th 1884. On August 16th 1887 she gave birth to a son who was named Milnes Bartling Levick, after his grandfather. Gus & Ada appeared in various plays together. She brought divorce proceedings against him in 1895, claiming mistreatment, however her husband claimed that she left him to pursue her theatrical career. In 1907, it was reported that she resided in San Francisco with her mother.

She died on June 22, 1908 in Frankfort, Indiana, following several weeks of illness. She had contracted pneumonia, complicated by heart failure. She was survived by her mother, several sisters and son Milnes (named after his grandfather), the latter of whom was at her bedside at the time of death.
