= Cymbeline Refinished =

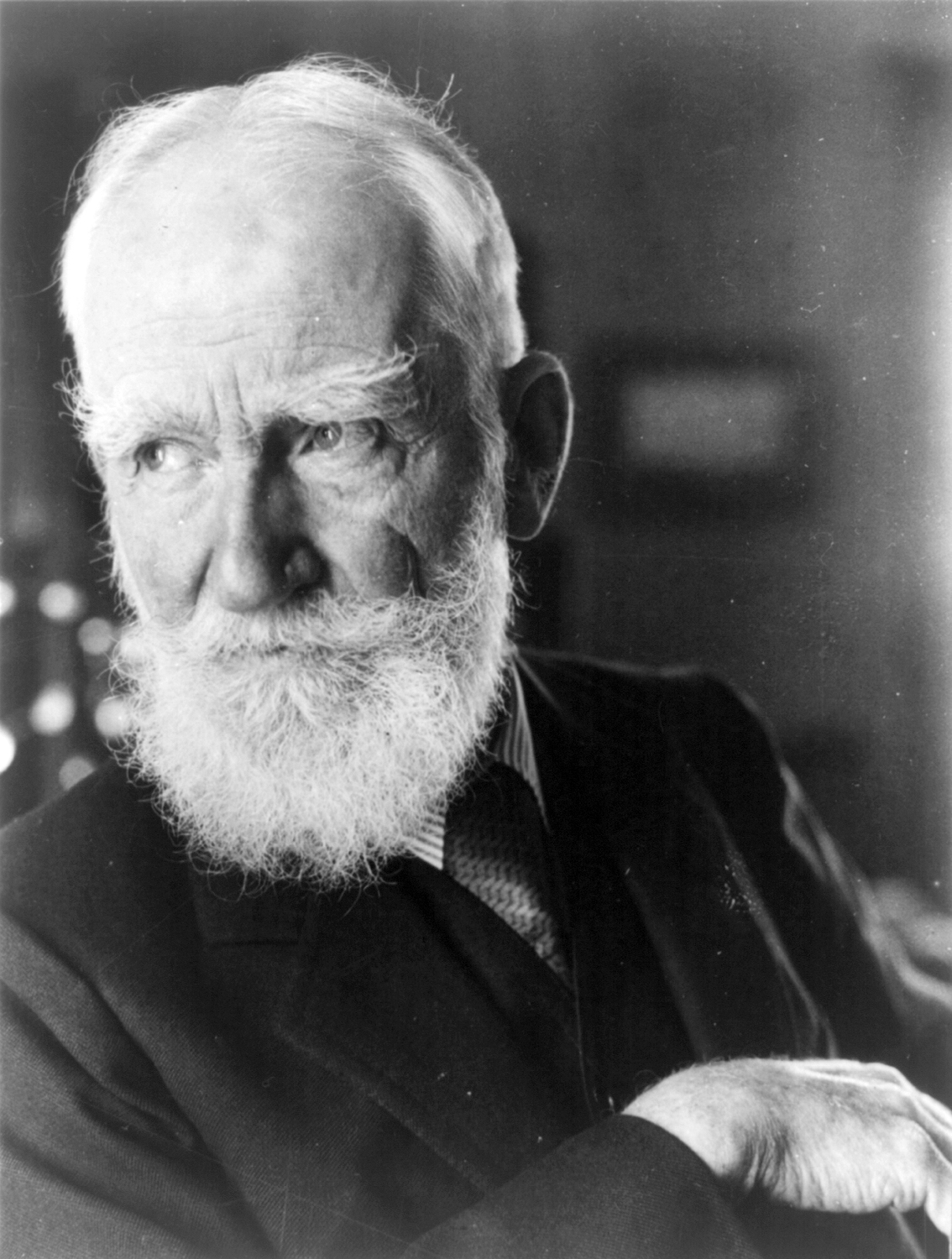
- Written by: George Bernard Shaw
- Original language: English
- Subject: The phantasmogoric last act of Shakespeare's Cymbeline is replaced by more rational one
- Genre: history play comedy
- Setting: Ancient Britain

Premiere
- Date premiered: 1937

Cymbeline Refinished (1937) is a play-fragment by George Bernard Shaw in which he writes a new final act to Shakespeare's play Cymbeline. The drama follows from Shaw's longstanding need to reimagine Shakespeare's work, epitomised by his play Caesar and Cleopatra and his late squib Shakes versus Shav.

== Creation ==
The play was written "as a lark" after the committee of the Shakespeare Memorial Theatre were looking for a way to market a staging of Cymbeline as part of a plan to fund a memorial to Shakespeare. The ending of Cymbeline had been ridiculed in the nineteenth century, but the play was just beginning to be reconsidered as an "experimental romance". Shaw was consciously engaging in a long tradition of rewriting Shakespeare for modern values and tastes.

Shaw had expressed the standard Victorian view of the play in 1896 when he wrote that it was "stagey trash of the lowest melodramatic order". After altering the ending, Shaw changed his mind about the bulk of the play, but remained convinced that the last act was a disaster, writing in 1946 that it was "one of the finest of Shakespeare's later plays" but "goes to pieces in the final act".

== Plot ==
Shaw removed many of the revelations that accumulate in the final act, cutting its length by more than half. He minimises the discovery that Polydore and Cadwal are Imogen's long lost brothers. In the end they decide to return to rural life in Wales rather than join the royal court. The deus ex machina scene in which Jupiter descends from the heavens is also dropped. Shaw removes the implausible account of the British victory over the Roman legions, which in the original is achieved purely by the superhuman heroism of Posthumus, Polydore and Cadwal. He replaces it with a conversation in which the Romans discuss the possibility that the Britons recalled Belarius, a general who "knew his job", to command their forces.

Shaw also makes Imogen a much more assertive figure, in line with his feminist views. He creates a scene in which Iachimo confesses to Posthumus. Imogen recognises Posthumus's voice and actively uncovers his identity. After Posthumus repents, she continues to point out the immorality of his actions, and resents the suggestion that she should accept her husband back unconditionally, but in the end accepts that "I must go home and make the best of it, as other women must."

89 lines of the original play were retained in Shaw's version.

== Critical views ==
Paradoxically Shaw offered his own alternative ending as challenge to producers to restore Shakespeare's original, which had been crudely cut in many productions. The act is written in blank verse, but C.B. Young notes that there is "a violent change of tone from the fairy-tale and romantic atmosphere of the original acts to the Shavian wit with a touch of cynicism, of the end." Bernard F. Dukore says that "Shaw's refinishing of Cymbeline's last act reveals such features of Shavian comedy as his typical treatment of exposition; his focus, not on the resolution of a situation, but on the response of the characters to that resolution; and broad comedy with a realistic base."
