= Regni =

Late Iron Age and Roman era British tribe

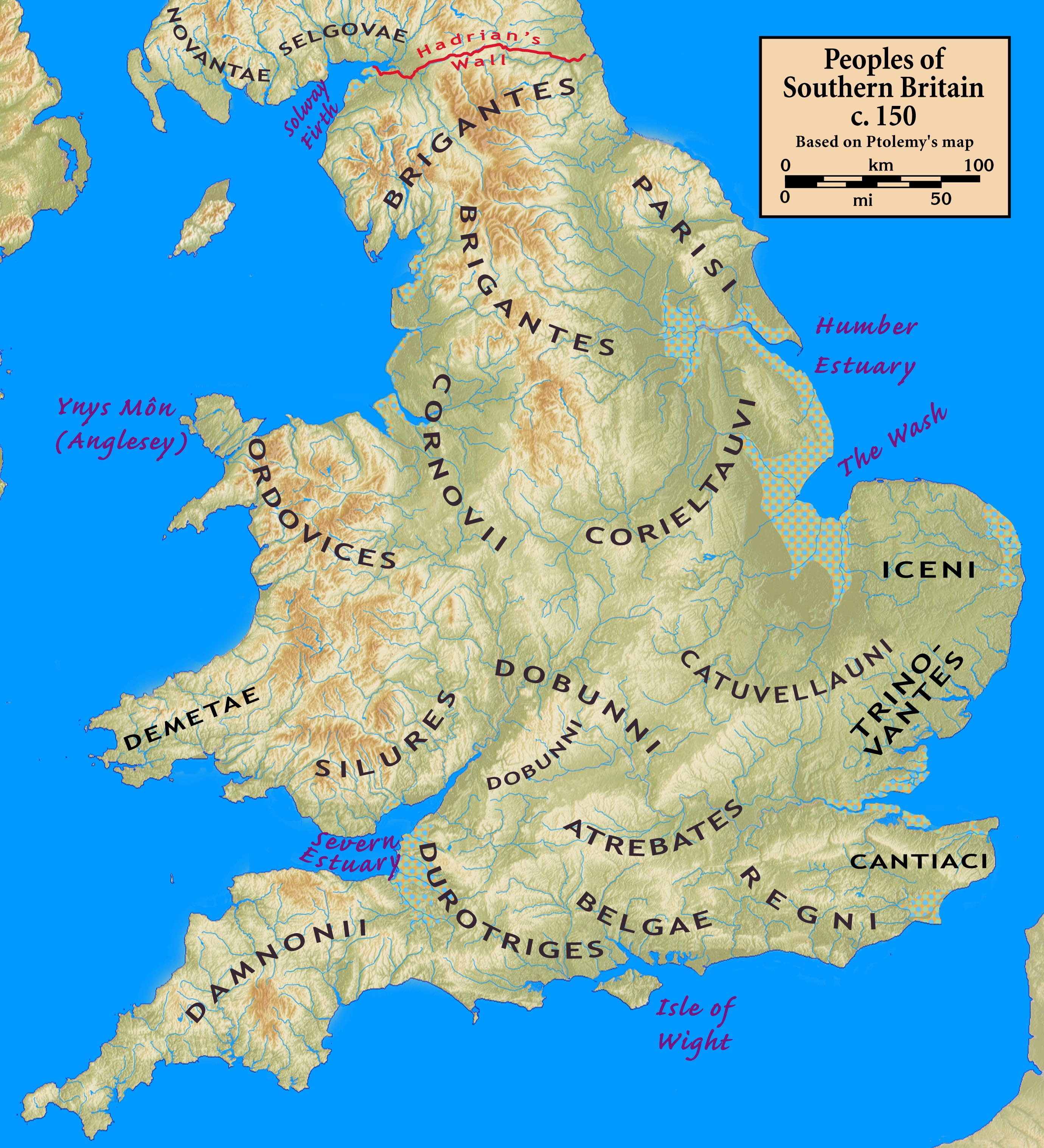

Geography
- Capital: Noviomagus Reginorum (Chichester)
- Location: Sussex (Also parts of Hampshire, Kent, Surrey)
- Rulers: Diviciacus of the Suessiones: 90 - 60 BC Commius, the Atrebatian: 51 - 35 BC Commius the Younger: 35 - 20 BC Tincomaros: 30 BC - 7 AD Eppillus: 30 BC - 15 AD Verica: 15 - 41 AD Tiberius Claudius Cogidubnus: 43 - 80 AD

The Regni (also the Regini or the Regnenses) were a Celtic tribe, or group of tribes, living in Britain prior to the Roman Conquest, and later a civitas or canton of Roman Britain. They lived in what is now Sussex, as well as small parts of Hampshire, Surrey and Kent, with their tribal heartland at Noviomagus Reginorum (modern Chichester).

== Territory ==
It is generally accepted that the Regni broadly occupied the region that later became Sussex. Surrey is sometimes included within Regni territory and sometimes within the territory of the Atrebates to the north. However the archeological record north of the Weald shows significant differences to the south and so it would appear Surrey was not normally included in the Regni tribal area.

The tribe was surrounded on the west by the Belgae, on the north by the Atrebates, and on the east by the Cantiaci. To the south and east across the Oceanus Britannicus or Oceanus Gallicus (the present day English Channel) lay Gaul and the tribal areas of the Caletes, Veliocasses, Catuslugi, Ambiani and the Morini.

== Name ==
The tribe’s existence is traced to the city of Chichester. During the Roman era, Chichester was a Civitas Capital, indicating it was a minor capital city governing a small tribal region. While maps typically indicate the Atrebates as the tribe occupying Chichester, the name of the city suggests the Regini actually controlled the area.

Chichester's Roman name, Noviomagus Reginorum, is widely accepted to translate as “New Market,” but the meaning of Reginorum has been a subject of debate. Originally interpreted as “The People of the Kingdom,” i.e., the people of Cogidubnus’ client kingdom, a comparison with other civitas capitals reveals a different meaning. For instance, the tribal capital of the Durotriges tribe in Dorset (Dorchester) is Durotrigium, corresponding to the land of the Durotriges. This naming convention is also seen in other regional capitals like Atrebatum (Silchester) within Atrebates territory and Belgarum (Winchester) in Belgae territory. Applying this pattern to Chichester suggests that Reginorum should be understood as “New Market, Land of the Regini”. Regnini or Regni is believed to come from a Brythonic word Regini (and the Gaulish and Old Welsh word Regin) meaning the “proud ones” or the “stiff ones.”

The name of this people is not entirely certain. Ptolemy refers to the Ρηγνοι (Latin: Regni), whose only city was Νοιομαγος, Noiomagus. This appears to be the same place as Navimago Regentium or Noviomagus Regionorum, from which Regnenses, occurring in some modern sources, appears to be derived. The location is generally supposed to be Chichester. The Antonine Itinerary refers to a place called Regno at the end of Roman Road 7, perhaps referring to a site along the coast of the Solent. Some scholars reject Regnenses in favour of Ptolemy's Regni or a Brythonic name Regini.

== Background ==
By the Middle Iron Age (c. 250 BC) the first millennium BC hillforts on the northern and southern edges of the South Downs, such as Chanctonbury Ring and Highdown Hill had fallen out of use, replaced by new, smaller number of more dramatic hillforts on the Downs, such as at the Caburn, Cissbury and the Trundle. Unlike in the region of Wessex to the west, settlement close to these hillforts was limited. These hillforts were probably built to be impressive monuments rather than defensive structures, uniting local communities and giving them a renewed sense of identity. Also at this time, the coastal plain to the west of modern-day Brighton was resettled. By the end of the Middle Iron Age (c. 100BC) the downland hillforts had been abandoned, and settlements on the coastal plain became more numerous.

== Late Iron Age (c. 100 BC – early 1st century) ==
The Regni were probably a group of native tribes influenced by the Belgae. The sudden appearance of new coin designs hints that some tribes in south-eastern Britain might have been under the control of a Belgic elite and adopted aspects of their culture as early as 100–80 BC. The distribution of Aylesford-Swarling pottery in south-eastern Britain has also been associated with the Belgae; however, recent studies proposed that migration might not have played as significant a role as once thought, with increased trade connections being more important, although this remains uncertain.

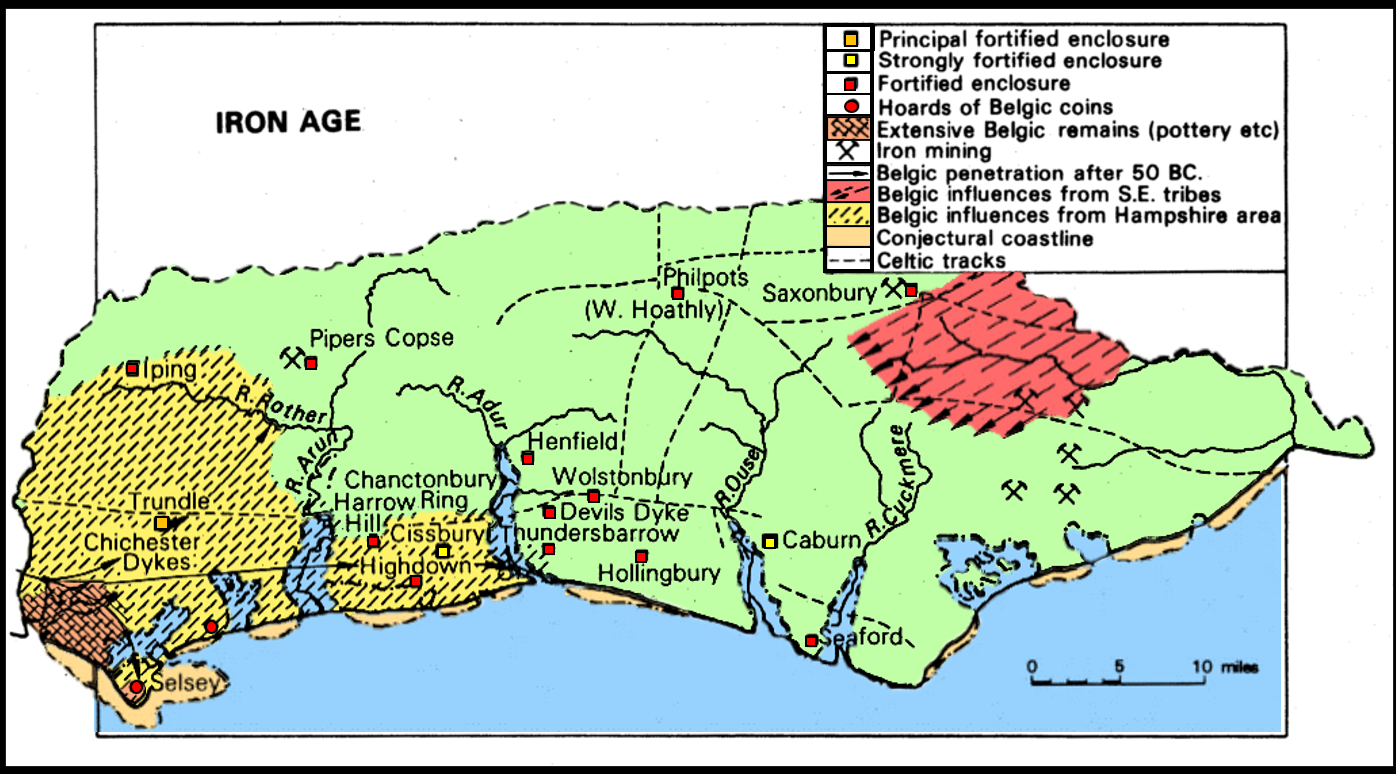
The Impact of Belgic Culture on the Regini Tribe of Contemporary Sussex

The Regni entered a period of historical documentation around 75 BC, with the emergence of written records and the rise of a literate society, accompanied by a more complex economic system. Various groups' movements were no longer tracked solely through pottery artefacts but also through the identification of coins, marking a level of literacy, the aggregation of core cultures in specific regions, and the introduction of monetary transactions for trading surplus goods. Driven by pressures from tribal factions on the Continent and the Romans' continued conquests in Gaul, rebellious groups set out across the sea in search of unoccupied lands, especially where local chieftains resisted Roman rule. This likely marked the initial 'invasion' of Sussex, although detailed accounts of battles and conquests are scarce. The Gallo-Belgic tribes, also known as Celts, integrated their dominance into the existing social structure rather than replacing it; even during the later Roman era, indigenous Neolithic inhabitants coexisted with Iron Age urban residents in Sussex. Significant newcomers like Commius of the Atrebates, who sought sanctuary in Britain around 52 BC, brought and promoted a level of civilisation influenced by Rome. The Atrebates settled across a wide area encompassing Hampshire, Wiltshire, and parts of eastern Sussex, with some falling under the rule of the Catuvellauni by 25 BC.

Following the initial 'conquest' and subsequent power shifts, Sussex stabilised into a new order. The influence of the Atrebates extended toward the Ouse and partially into the Weald, while tribes in the northeast and Kent maintained a more defensive stance, with Mount Caburn being a strongly fortified boundary town. The new ruling class notably abandoned the large developed hill-forts at the Trundle and Cissbury in favour of sophisticated urban centres on the coastal plain. This was particularly in the Selsey-Chichester area, which has since succumbed to coastal erosion.

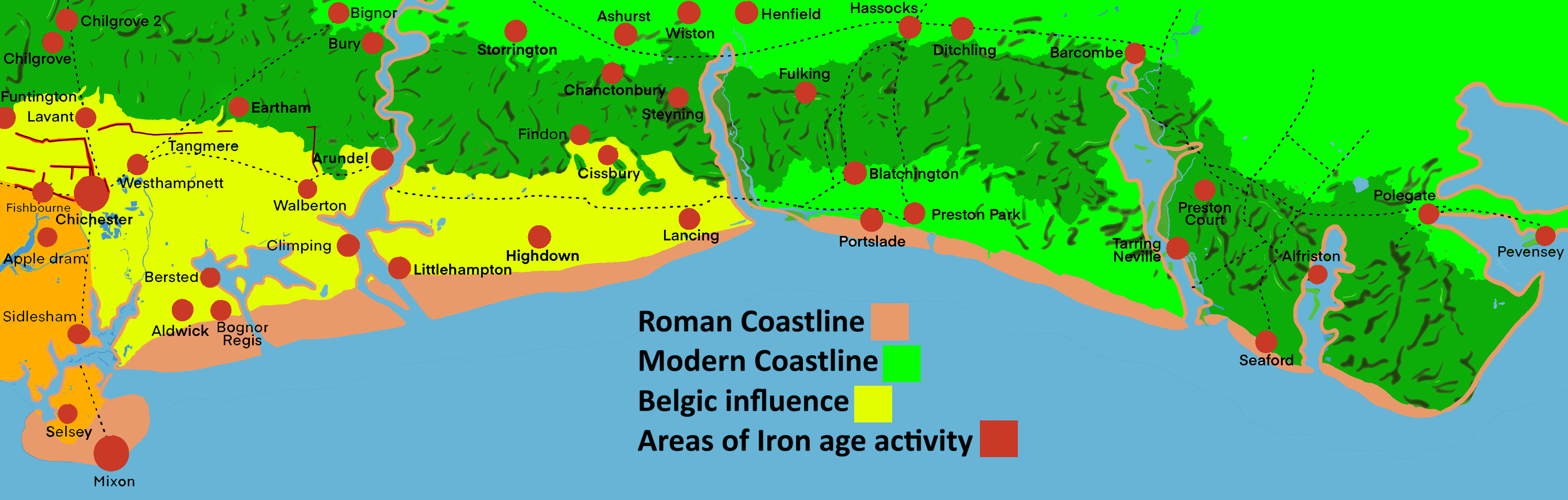
Beach Sustainability and Biodiversity on Eastern Channel Coasts Interim Report of the Beaches At Risk (BAR) Project University of Sussex, East Sussex County Council, Université de Rouen in association with the Université de Caen, University of the Littoral Opal Coast, Dunkerque

The settlements of the Regni tribe are mapped out in the West Sussex region, particularly situated around the River Lavant and between the river systems of the Arun and Adur. Noteworthy is the Major Oppidum (City) located in Chichester, along with the Selsey/Mixon rocks. It's believed that the Cymenshore/Mixon rocks were submerged around the 7th or 8th century AD, Large iron age shrine/votive site, also of significance is the Romano-Belgic Palace found at Fishbourne, which included a coin mint and shrine at Ratham, alongside ironworks at Boxgrove. The discovery of the Mystery Atrebate Warrior and the burial of the North Bersted Man at Bersted contribute to the historical narrative or the Regini.

Trade and fishing activities were prevalent at a small enclosure in Pagham, while Climping was recognised as a major trade centre. Coldharbour at the mouth of the Arun yielded a Roman hoard along with gold and silver Celtic coins. The Romano-Belgic Villa at Bognor and another trade centre at Tortington also produced gold and silver Celtic numismatics. Arundel served as a large Iron Age population centre, with substantial enclosures at Rewell Wood nearby, which during the late Bronze Age, was one of the largest settlements in Europe. There was a Romano-Belgic Villa at Bignor, and at Coldharbour, south of Stoke, a small quantity of silver Celtic coins was found.

Various settlement enclosures at Warningcamp may be linked to the Rewell Wood tribes, while the Burpham vicinity yielded Iron Age artefacts along with bone fragments from burials and signs of earthworks. The trade inlet at Nutbourne and Bosham, located at Chichester Harbour, also produced gold and silver Celtic coins. Wittering, which is now submerged, served as another trade centre at Chichester Harbour inlet, while Tournerbury hill fort is positioned approximately 100 metres from the Solent shoreline on nearby Hayling Island, just over the modern border with Hampshire, where Iron Age and Roman pottery have been discovered.

Rowlands Castle has shown evidence of Romano-British pottery, bricks, and tiles, benefiting from the nearby availability of suitable clay. Goosehill Camp features multiple enclosure hillforts situated on sloping grounds just below the ridge summit of the Sussex Downs. The Apple Down/Kingley Vale Ancient Forest is known as one of the oldest forests in Europe, containing yew trees that are up to 2,000 years old—some of the oldest living organisms in Great Britain.

The Trundle hillfort is found on the notable St. Roche's Hill, recognised as one of the prominent hills along the southern edge of the Sussex Downs. In Chilgrove, Bronze Age and Roman earthworks, cross dykes, and an ancient field system were established. Funtington features Coldharbour trade activities along the River Lavant, along with earthworks, cross dykes, a camp, and a field system, while a small quantity of gold and silver Celtic coins was discovered. Keynor was identified as an inland trade point that has since become silted.

The Regni expanded into the Weald, engaging not only in agriculture but also in exploiting iron resources crucial for their weaponry and tools. Archaeological remains of these industrial sites indicate a growing division of labour before the Roman period, alongside a developing hierarchy among tribal leaders who adopted somewhat Roman lifestyles while establishing a relative peace in their territories. Textile production preceded leatherwork as the primary industry, supported by the presence of salt producers along the Selsey coast, indicating a thriving trading economy that raised the standard of living for the ruling elite. They introduced cremation practices and organised burial sites to replace earlier native burial customs, though their involvement with the powerful Druidic cults of the late Iron Age remains uncertain. Information on the social customs of the Atrebates is limited and subject to potential biases from certain Roman chroniclers.

Descriptions by Tacitus portray the south-eastern Britons as having similarities with their Gaulish counterparts: valiant yet hesitant in battle, fond of adorning themselves with woad, and possibly open to polyandry, though the accuracy of this claim is ambiguous. Julius Caesar's depiction of the Britons aligns well with the idea of the Regini tribe influenced by Belgic culture. The inland areas of Britain were inhabited by people claiming native heritage, while coastal regions were populated by migrants from Belgium who arrived to engage in warfare. These individuals often took names from their states of origin and settled after conflicts, integrating into agricultural practices. The island sustained a substantial population, featuring structures reminiscent of Gaul, and abundant livestock. The coastal territories of the Manhood Peninsula fit this description well, supported by Numismatics and Belgic influences.

This central area likely served as the heart of the Belgic-influenced Regni tribe, stretching from the boundaries of Hampshire to the Trisantona Fluvius (the River Arun), meeting the English Channel at Littlehampton. The tribes outside this core area in the Sussex Weald were likely predominantly indigenous Brythonic communities who interacted with the Belgic-influenced Britons along the West Sussex coast. Regini, appearing to have been predominantly influenced by the Atrebates, could have been either a branch of the Belgic Atrebates or part of a confederation of smaller tribes predating the Atrebates' presence in Sussex and Hampshire. Despite seemingly avoiding complete submission to the Atrebates and maintaining some autonomy, their close ties to them were apparent, with Noviomagus serving as an early capital for the Atrebates, strategically positioned near a coastal area convenient for Celtic migrations from the mainland.

Situated geographically along the southern coast of Britain, they likely assimilated more advanced practices and traded with Continental tribes until the Roman conquest of Gaul. The Regni, in conjunction with the Atrebates, seemingly saw Rome as a chance to enhance their commerce in opulent textiles, hunting dogs, and Iron goods, thus encouraging a reciprocal exchange of concepts that enriched their culture and technology, potentially giving them an advantage over less developed neighbouring tribes. It is likely that the Regni were among the most assimilated British tribes to Roman culture. They had already developed trade relationships with Rome, maintaining a Roman trading post and a small Roman influence even prior to the Roman conquest in AD 43. The Romans' significant utilization of Chichester Harbour within the Regni's lands right after AD 43 indicates that the Regni's supportive ties with Rome allowed the Romans an avenue to provide resources to the Roman legions operating in the south-west of Britain.

Excavations in North Bersted, Oldplace Farm, and Copse Farm uncovered remnants of late Iron Age farmsteads and complex field systems, indicating widespread agricultural activities along the coastal plains. Archaeological investigations on Selsey Island revealed minimal late Iron Age or Roman remains, suggesting that while the area may have been inundated during that period, it was not a main settlement area. The presence of numerous Iron Age gold coins at Selsey Bill may suggest ritual offerings in the marshlands and even into the sea.

== Client kingdom (early-late 1st century) ==
It has been suggested that, after the first phase of the conquest, the Romans maintained a nominally independent client kingdom, perhaps acting as a buffer between the Roman province in the east and the unconquered tribes to the west. There has been some debate about the extent of this territory, whose ruler was Tiberius Claudius Cogidubnus or Cogidumnus.

The only tribal area Cogidubnus definitely ruled was the Regni. Tacitus says "quaedam civitates Cogidumno regi donatae" ('certain civitates were given to King Cogidumnus') and remarks on his loyalty. Some have assumed that Cogidubnus must also have ruled over the civitates of the Belgae and the Atrebates, while Miles Russell has suggested that the kingdom could have extended northwards to the south and east Midlands, and westwards to Bath. John Creighton not only takes the view that the kingdom extended to the Midlands, he also argues that Cogidubdus' predecessors, formed a Southern dynasty of kings, ruling what was a Roman client kingdom from the early 1st century.

A first century inscription found in Chichester supplies his Latin names, indicating he was given Roman citizenship by Claudius or Nero. Cogidubnus may have been a relative of Verica, the Atrebatian king whose overthrow was the excuse for the conquest. After Cogidubnus's death, the kingdom would have been incorporated into the directly ruled Roman province and divided into its constituent civitates, such as the Regni, Atrebates and Belgae.

=== Controversies ===
Likewise, the theory that Cogidubnus was created legatus, a rank only ever given to senators, is based on reconstructing the damaged Chichester inscription to read as Cogidubni regis legati Augusti in Britannia ('king and imperial legate in Britain'). It more probably reads Cogidubni regis magni Britanniae ('great king of Britain').

== Roman civitas (late 1st century—c.410 AD) ==
After the death of Cogidubnus around 80 AD, the region became part of the Roman Empire proper. Governed as a Roman civitas, with its capital at Noviomagus, the region had several ports, Roman roads and villas. The key roads include the route north-east from Noviomagus which crossed the Thames at what became Londinium (modern-day London), known to the Saxons as Stane Street. Running east from Noviomagus was a route to Novus Portus (probably modern-day Portslade) and to the north-west ran a route to Calleva Atrebatum (modern Silchester), the capital of the neighbouring civitas of the Atrebates. Another route connected modern-day Lewes to Londinium. The Sussex Greensand Way connected the Chichester-London and Lewes-London routes.

Following raids across both sides of the English Channel in the late 3rd century, the Romans established the a series of forts across both sides of the Channel, including the fort of Anderitum (modern Pevensey) in the civitas of the Regni.

There was a large iron-producing industry in the vast forest known as the Sylva Anderida (the modern Weald). This included the 3rd -largest works in the entire Roman Empire, at Beauport Park near Hastings.

== Post-Roman era (c. 410 AD - 7th century) ==
Following the departure of Roman troops to Gaul in 407, Roman rule in Britain came to an end. In the former civitas of the Regni, the Kingdom of Sussex began its formation over the next half-century, traditionally with the arrival over the sea of King Aelle and his three sons in 477 AD, although Aelle's existence is debated and the South Saxon arrivals probably closer to 450 AD. A hoard of Roman coins, now known as the Patching Hoard, was deposited around 475 AD, the latest in Britain.

According to Michael Shapland, it is likely that the western area of the Regni canton, lying to the west of the River Arun, continued to have a Celtic British culture for many decades, even after the establishment of the Kingdom of Sussex, perhaps as a related kingdom or sub-kingdom. Some of the kings of Sussex have Celtic names, such as Æthelwealh. The choice of Selsey Abbey, on what was at the time the island of Selsey, had more in common with the ancient Christian centres of Lindisfarne, Glastonbury and Iona, all in areas where post-Roman Celtic kingdoms continued. Sussex's cathedral would appear to have more in common with the Celtic British Church and indicate Celtic origins.

== Religion ==
=== Paganism ===
There is a notable concentration of shrines in the region, notably at Hayling Island, Lancing Down and Westhampnett. There was also a temple at Chanctonbury Ring which may have been part of a cult of the wild boar.

Cremation was established in the Regni tribal area by the 70s BC, even earlier in the major cemetery at Westhampnett.

==== Goddesses of the Regni ====
In south-eastern Britain, original coin designs have been found that skillfully combine Roman official symbols, featuring the likeness of the goddess Roma on the coins issued by the Regni tribe in West Sussex. These symbols reveal the self-perception of the Regni rulers, shedding light on historical political occurrences of the past. The representation of Roma we are examining is a blend influenced by Hellenistic artistic styles, crafted for the Roman denarius in 211 BC. It encapsulates Rome as a political entity, comprising the city, state, citizenship, origin, and the essence of Roman expansion. Categorised differently from conventional goddesses such as Diana or Minerva, Roma was not associated with sacred tales or ancient Indo-European gods. The helmeted Roman figure of Roma was inspired by Diana and Minerva but stands out due to its distinctive attributes like the Attic helmet adorned with a gryphon crest and tendrils extending to wings.

Engravers in Gaul and Britain selectively integrated these specific features. The depiction of "Roma" by the Regni tribe in Britain incorporates regional elements, akin to the similarity observed between Roma in Rome and the goddesses Diana and Minerva.

The Commios Ladder head silver units (30 - 45 BC) depict a Celtic fertility Goddess with unique features like a lentoid eye, swollen cheeks, and a bulbous chin. Her long flowing hair resembles moons, possibly representing a Luna deity. Circular Goat Horns hover above her head, and a flower is positioned in front of her, as though she is either smelling it or whispering to it. The symbols surrounding the goddess hold unknown meanings. Rotating the coin reveals a clear image of a Snake. This intricate design combines a lunar goddess with a horned serpent, likely Cernunnos, depicting the Great Queen of the Atrebates and Regni alongside the horned serpent. This fusion symbolises her diverse identity and authoritative position.

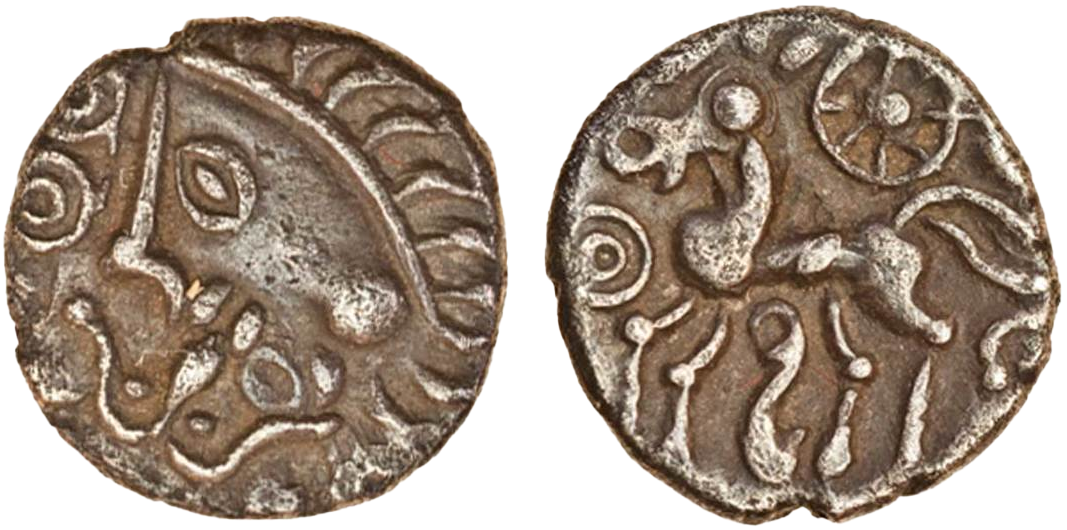

The Selsey Diadem gold quarter stater (55-50 BC) features a goddess with a diadem adorned with a moon symbol and two twisted locks of hair by her ears. The coin also depicts a horse and foal, along with a wheel and quatrefoil flower on the front. Moon-crowns were not exclusive to the Regini tribe. Roman Republican denarii depict female heads with crescent diadems, similar to modern tiaras. A denarius from 56BC with a diadem and a small moon above it may have inspired the Regini Selsey Diadem. Epona, a Gallo-Roman deity associated with horses, was believed to guide souls in the afterlife, resembling the depiction of Rhiannon in the Mabinogion. Rhiannon, like Epona, is often shown with her son Pryderi as a mare and foal, linking her to the Gaulish horse deity Epona.

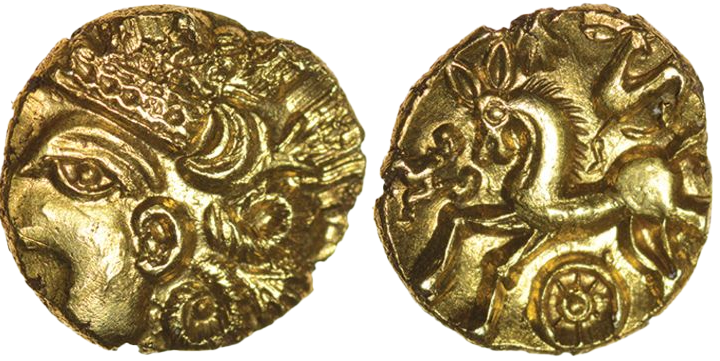

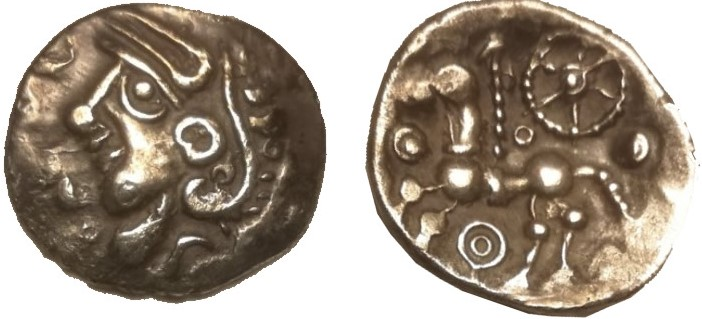
The Sussex Helmet silver unit dating from 60-20 BC shows a Goddess with a helmet, possibly a prototype Roma due to the rarity of such portrayals. Within the British setting, depictions of Roma likely combined with local religious symbols, highlighting distinct characteristics. The god worshipped by the Regini community might be tied to the Roman goddess Minerva, as hinted by an inscription on a stone found at a shrine dedicated to Neptune and Minerva in Noviomagus Reginorum, now Chichester.

The Ashdown Forest Helmet Silver unit (50-40 BC) shows a goddess in a helmet with horns and boar-bristled crest, along with a large lentoid eye similar to the bronze helmet discovered near Waterloo Bridge in the Thames. It seems that the Romas Greco-Roman Attic helmet, which had a gryphon crest, has been replaced by a local style helmet. The delicate bronze Waterloo Bridge helmet was probably not suited for combat but rather for ceremonial purposes, much like ancient bronze shields mainly used for display rather than protection. Some believe its small size indicates it may have decorated a wooden statue of a Celtic deity.

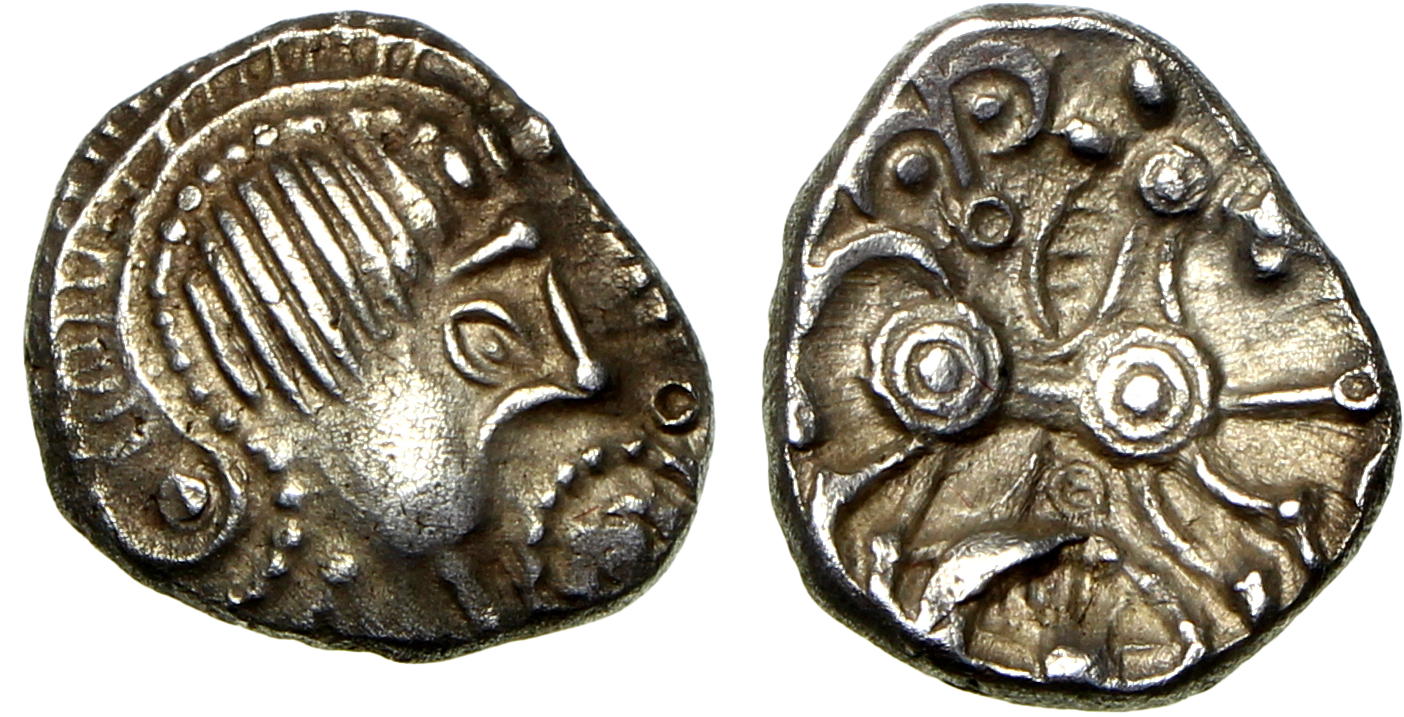

Dating back to 55-45 BC, the Sussex Lyre silver unit features a portrayal of a Diademed goddess head with a distinctive pointed nose, wearing a neck torc and curly hair, possibly representing Trisantona, linked to the River Arun. On the reverse side, a horse with a zigzag tail, spoked wheel, and a unique lyre is depicted. While ancient Celtic lyre details are limited, it was used by Celtic bards from the 8th century BC and was later called the lyra during the Roman period. Made largely of wood with bone elements, the lyre had animal intestine strings in its resonator. Despite probably adopting it from the Greeks, the Gauls and other Celtic groups valued the crwth (Lyra) as a symbol of their musical heritage. The Gauls and Britons associated the instrument with their religious customs, using it in rituals and hymns for their tribal deities.

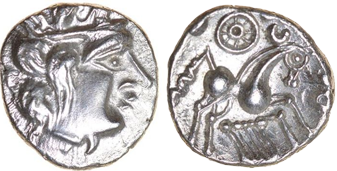

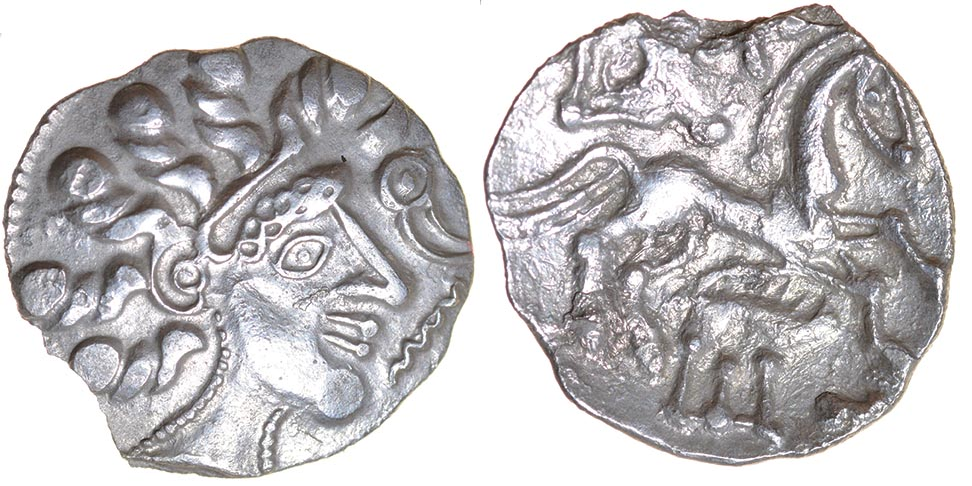
The Chichester Goddess Silver unit (50-30 BC) depicts a unique Goddess with distinct features including an oval eye, long pointed nose, thin lips, round prominent chin, slender curved neck, and flowing hair locks. She wears a honeycomb diadem and a duck visor helmet with a duck head and serpent-like creature. Ducks in Celtic mythology symbolise femininity, divinity, and otherworldly powers, linked to the goddess Sequana and the River Seine. The obverse side portrays a triple-tailed horse with a linear mane galloping with a boar below, associated with Moccus, the boar god of the Lingones tribe. Boar meat was sacred to the ancient Celts, reflecting in Celtic feasts. Lingones were a Gaulish tribe based near the Seine and Marne rivers in northeastern France, neighboring the Celto-Germanic Treveri tribe. Another Lingones tribe in north eastern Italy specialized in agriculture, weaving, and metalworking.

The Regini transformed the abstraction of a civitas personification into a concrete and symbolic entity. This transition highlights how a personified civitas could take on ceremonial and narrative significance. British Brigantia represents one instance of this type of development, while the Icenian personification could be another. In a parallel vein, even the Romans sanctioned a similar evolution by erecting an altar to Roma and Augustus in Lugdunum (Lyon) in 10 BC during Augustus’ reign to act as the focal point of the imperial cult for the three Gallic provinces.

Throughout the 1st century BC, several Gaulish authorities minted silver quinarius coins featuring the head of Roma. Subtle variations differentiate these local depictions from the original image, suggesting their adoption to convey regional significance. For instance, a Gallic torc necklace might be added, the gryphon crest on Roma's helm could be altered or removed entirely, such as in the case of replacing it with a horsehair or boar-bristle crest in Britain. Additionally, explicit wings might be absent or substituted with a different linear design. In the 1st century BC, various Gallic leaders minted silver quinarius coins featuring a depiction of Roma. These local adaptations of Roma's image included unique elements such as the addition of a Gallic torc necklace and the replacement of Romas gryphon crest with symbols like a horsehair or boar-bristle crest. Some coins also omitted the wings or substituted them with different designs.

All the coins shown were produced prior to 50 BC by affluent and well-organized allies of the Roman state. The Aedui, Sequani, and Lingones underwent political transformations early in the 1st century BC, implementing oligarchic structures similar to those of the Roman administration. Julius Caesar and his successors referred to the Gallic tribes as civitates, the Latin term for organized political entities or states. Similarly, the helmeted head on Roman coins symbolized the civitas Romana, the Roman state. Like the Gauls, the creators of British coin images made a clear distinction between abstract state symbols and depictions of powerful protective goddesses. The depiction of the Roma goddess by the Regini and Iceni resembles a cult image, possibly representing a British equivalent to deities like Diana/Artemis or Minerva/Pallas Athene.

The use of Roman symbolism on Gaulish and British coins reflects a desire to project themselves as autonomous political entities equal to the Roman state. Coin design often coincided with political transformations and administrative reforms, and the adoption of Roman imagery suggests the emergence of tribal leagues, larger kingdoms, and oligarchic states. The coins produced during this period indicate that groups like the Regini, Belgae, East Wiltshire groups, and Iceni may have viewed themselves as a confederation with shared ceremonial institutions, united by a collective identity and legal system. The word for a People or tribal state in Gaul and Britain at that time, Teuta or Touta, was a feminine noun, similar to the Latin Civitas, allowing for personification as a female deity. Just as Roma personified the Roman Civitas, the adapted image of Roma on Gallic and British coins likely represented the existence of a comparable citizen body, Civitas or Teuta.

=== Christianity ===
Following the Edict of Thessalonica in 380 AD, Christianity became the official religion of the Roman Empire. At Wiggonholt, on a tributary of the River Arun, a large lead tank with repeated chi-rho motifs was discovered in 1943, the only Roman period artefact in Sussex found with a definite Christian association. It may represent a baptismal font or a container for holy water, or alternatively may have been used by pagans.

== See also ==
- Iron Age tribes in Britain
- List of Celtic tribes
- Beachy Head Lady
- North Bersted Man
- Bosham Head
- Fishbourne Roman Palace

== Bibliography ==
- Langlands, James; Lavelle, Ryan (2020). The Land of the English Kin: Studies in Wessex and Anglo-Saxon England in Honour of Professor Barbara Yorke. Brill. ISBN 9789004421899.
- Rudling, David; Russell, Miles (2015). Bignor Roman Villa. The History Press. ISBN 978-0750964784.
- Venning, Timothy (2023). A Compendium of World Sovereigns: Volume 1. Taylor & Francis. ISBN 9781000868500.
- Webster, Graham (2019). Rome Against Caratacus: The Roman Campaigns in Britain AD 48-58. Taylor & Francis. ISBN 9781317709695.
