= Saint Claudia =

Topics referred to by the same term

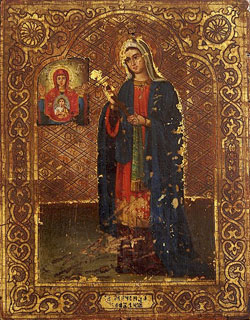
Icon of Claudia

Saint Claudia may refer to:

- A Christian of 1st-century Rome, mentioned by Paul alongside Eubulus, Pudens and Linus in his Second Epistle to Timothy 4:21. Nothing is known of her origins or social or marital status, which has led to centuries of speculation, such as that she was:

- The mother of Linus. According to the 4th-century Apostolic Constitutions, he was the first bishop of Rome, ordained by Paul and his mother was named Claudia.
- Claudia Rufina, a 1st-century British woman living in Rome, wife of Aulus Pudens. Since the 19th century she and her husband have been identified by some as the Claudia and Pudens of Second Timothy. She is usually identified as a daughter either of Cogidubnus or Caractacus. She is mentioned by Martial, but there is no direct evidence she was even a Christian.

- Two martyrs from the Diocletianic persecutions:

- One of the virgin martyrs of Amisos, burnt at the stake around 300. Their names were Claudia, Alexandra, Euphrasia, Matrona, Juliana, Euphemia, Theodosia and Derphuta with her sister. Their feast day is March 20.
- One of the companions of Theodotus of Ancyra, martyred probably in 303. The other victims were Theodotus' aunt Thecusa and six virgins named Alexandra, Claudia, Phaina, Euphrasia, Matrona and Julitta. The virgins were raped and then drowned in a marsh. Their feast day is May 18.
