= Winchester Hoard =

Iron Age gold hoard

Coordinates: 51.060386°N 1.329201°W

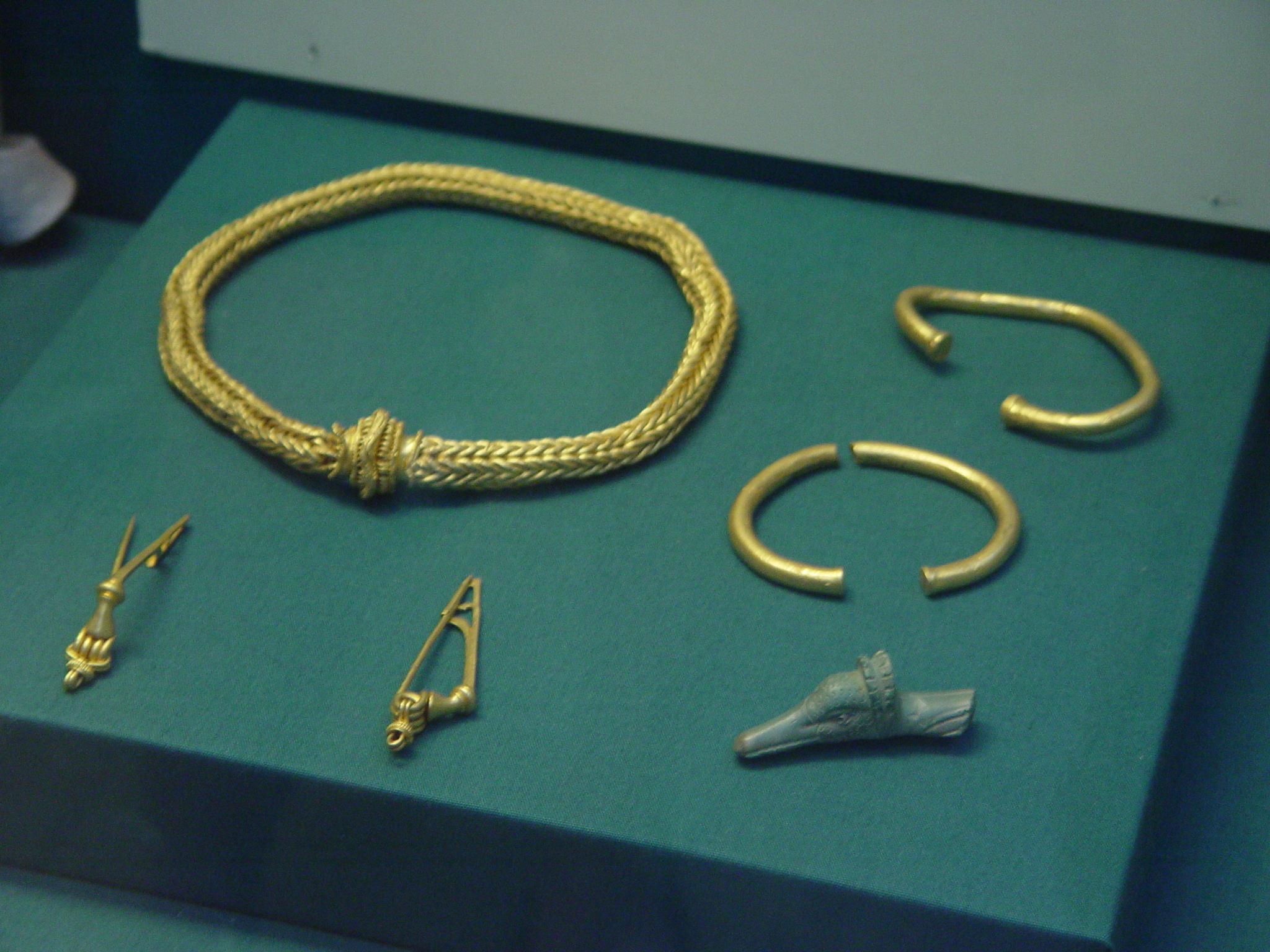
- Some items from the Winchester Hoard in the British Museum, with a torc at upper left
- Material: Gold
- Size: 10 jewellery pieces
- Period/culture: Iron Age
- Discovered: near Winchester, Hampshire by Kevan Halls in 2000
- Present location: Room 50, British Museum, London
- Identification: P&EE 2001 9-1 1-10

The Winchester Hoard is a hoard of Iron Age gold found in a field in the Winchester area of Hampshire, England, in 2000, by a retired florist and amateur metal detectorist, Kevan Halls. It was declared treasure and valued at £350,000—the highest reward granted under the Treasure Act 1996 at that time.

The hoard consists of two sets of jewellery of a very high purity of gold dating from 75 to 25 BCE. Although, the items pre-date the Roman conquest of Britain in 43 CE, the manufacturing technology was Roman rather than Celtic. The total weight of the items is nearly 1,160 g (41 oz).

The find was described as "the most important discovery of Iron Age gold objects" for fifty years; and the items were probably an "expensive", "diplomatic gift". The brooches alone were "the third discovery of its kind from Britain".

The Winchester Hoard is now housed at the British Museum in London.

== Discovery and valuation ==
The hoard was discovered near Winchester over a series of trips to a farmer's ploughed field in September, October, and December, 2000 by retired florist and amateur metal detectorist Kevan Halls.

The first discovery, which was of the brooches, was reported to the Portable Antiquities Scheme, and archaeologists attached to the British Museum were able to excavate the find site to ascertain the historical context of the find. No evidence of a settlement or temple, by way of architectural remnants, was found. It was more likely that the hoard was buried "on top of a small hill ... covered with trees".

The hoard was declared treasure following a coroner's inquest, and later valued at £350,000, which was shared between the finder and landowner under the Treasure Act 1996 – the highest reward granted under that Act at that time. It was also the first time the context of a find was investigated by the British Museum in conjunction with said Act.

== Items discovered ==
The hoard contains two sets of gold jewellery; each includes a torc, a pair of brooches, or fibulae, linked by a chain (of which only one chain was found), and a bracelet (of which one was broken in half). They were all made with a very high gold content – between 91% and 99% – determined by X-ray fluorescence tests at the British Museum. The total weight of the hoard is 1,158.8 g (40.88 oz) (37.25 troy ounces). It is dated from 75 to 25 BC, which places it in the Late British Iron Age.

All of the brooches are of a bow type, with two being further classified as Knotenfibeln ("interlace fibulas"), typical of La Tène style The chain is of gold wire, interlinked, with a hook at either end to attach to each pair of brooches. The bracelets are, or were in the case of the broken one, penannular (shaped as an incomplete circle). The ends of the torcs exhibit some ornamentation (granulation), and in the case of the smaller one, filigree. Both granulation and filigree had been attached by diffusion soldering.

One of the torcs is larger than the other, so it is assumed that each was intended for different sexes, and that the items had been worn.

=== Item specifications ===
| Item No. | Description | Length or diameter | Thickness | Weight | Gold content (approx) |
|---|---|---|---|---|---|
| 1 | Brooch 1 | 60 mm (2.4 in) | | 22.2 g (0.78 oz) | 94% |
| 2 | Brooch 2 | 60 mm (2.4 in) | | 22.5 g (0.79 oz) | 94% |
| 3 | Chain | 170 mm (6.7 in) | 4.4 mm (0.17 in) | 23.6 g (0.83 oz) | 94% |
| 4 | Brooch 3 | 80 mm (3.1 in) | | 20.7 g (0.73 oz) | 92% |
| 5 | Brooch 4 | 80 mm (3.1 in) | | 20.5 g (0.72 oz) | 91% |
| 6 | Bracelet (complete) | 90 mm (3.5 in) | | 94.1 g (3.32 oz) | 95% |
| 7 | Bracelet (half) | | | 53.3 g (1.88 oz) | 99% |
| 8 | Bracelet (half) | | | 53.1 g (1.87 oz) | 99% |
| 9 | Torc 1 | 480 mm (19 in) | 11 mm (0.43 in) | 516.7 g (18.23 oz) | 94% |
| 10 | Torc 2 | 440 mm (17 in) | 8.3 mm (0.33 in) | 332.1 g (11.71 oz) | 97% |

== Significance ==
The find was called "the most important discovery of Iron Age gold objects" since the Snettisham Hoard, over fifty years previously. The objects were also described as "unique", "very unusual" and even "iconic".

Given that gold brooches from the Iron Age are more rare than silver ones—in fact, this was only the third discovery of its kind from Britain, and one of "less than a dozen" from Northern Europe—it was possible to date the hoard more accurately by these. However, the torcs were unusual in that no others of this type had been found from Iron Age Britain, indeed Europe, up until then. The design was close to typical Iron Age torcs, but were made "using Roman or Hellenistic Greek technology", although this was several years before the Roman conquest of Britain in 43 AD – in other words, the execution was beyond the manufacturing knowledge of the Celts, and a link between Britain, Rome and Greece before such historical events. Moreover, social changes in Hampshire and West Sussex in the first century BC were highlighted.

The dichotomy of Roman craftmanship against "Barbarian taste" was further reinforced by Dr Jeremy Hills, who compiled both the British Museum and Treasure Annual Report for the hoard, by stating, "I would have liked them to have been made in Britain, but they weren't... They're massive, chunky and showy. No self-respecting Greek or Roman would have worn anything as gaudy".

It was determined that the hoard was not associated with grave goods, and was not part of a hoard associated with a settlement or religious location. It may, instead, have been a personal collection or votive offering. Hills further conjectured that "[t]hey were a very expensive gift, a major diplomatic gift", and that in doing so the Romans were "winning friends and influencing them", ultimately "conquering them that way". Ingratiating themselves with pro-Roman tribal kings, the Romans would have found it easier to quell internal unrest, thus making the recipients "puppet rulers beholden to the superpower of their age".

Who the recipient, or indeed the giver, of the "gift" was is still unknown. However, it could have a link to the Gaul turncoat, Commius, who eventually became king of the Atrebates after fleeing a position as aide to Caesar which he took up in 56 BC.

== Display ==
The hoard is now housed in Room 50 of the British Museum in London and was part of the Buried Treasure: Finding Our Past exhibition (November 2003 to November 2005). The exhibition travelled from London to the National Museum Cardiff, the Manchester Museum, the Hancock Museum in Newcastle upon Tyne, and the Norwich Castle Museum. Among other items in the exhibition were the Mildenhall Treasure, the Lewis chessmen, and the Ringlemere Cup.

In September 2003, BBC Two screened a documentary on the discovery of the hoard.

== See also ==
- List of hoards in Britain
- Snettisham Hoard
