= Claudia Rufina =

Woman of British descent who lived in Rome c. 90 AD

Claudia Rufina was a woman of British descent who lived in Rome c. 90 AD and was known to the poet Martial. Martial refers to her in Epigrams XI:53, describing her as "caeruleis [...] Britannis edita" ("sprung from the blue Britons", presumably in reference to the British custom of painting themselves with woad). He praises her for her beauty, education and fertility.

Claudia is probably identical with the "Claudia Peregrina" ("Claudia the Foreigner") whose marriage to his friend Aulus Pudens, an Umbrian centurion to whom several of his poems are addressed, Martial describes in Epigrams IV:13. She may also be the Claudia whose height Martial compares to the Palatine colossus, a gigantic statue that once stood near the Palatine Hill (Epigrams VIII:60).

== Disputed theories ==
=== Early Christianity ===
The second epistle to Timothy in the New Testament contains a passage which reads "Eubulus saluteth thee, and Pudens, and Linus, and Claudia, and all the brethren." It has long been conjectured that the Claudia and Pudens mentioned here may be the same as Claudia Rufina and her husband. William Camden's 1586 work Britannia makes this identification, citing John Bale and Matthew Parker. Camden's contemporary, the Vatican historian Caesar Baronius, came to the same conclusion in his Annales Ecclesiastici. In the 17th century James Ussher agreed, and identified the Linus mentioned as the early Bishop of Rome of that name (Pope Linus's mother's name is given as Claudia in the Apostolic Constitutions). John Williams made the same identification in the 19th century, and Welsh historian Peter C. Bartrum concurred in his 1993 Welsh Classical Dictionary.

However, beyond the coincidence of names—the name Claudia was borne by every female member of the gens Claudia, a prominent aristocratic Roman family, and Pudens was not uncommon as a Roman cognomen—there is no evidence of a link between the Claudia and Pudens mentioned by Martial and the Claudia and Pudens referred to in 2 Timothy. Martial wrote in the 90s, while 2 Timothy is traditionally dated to the 60s. Some scholars consider the Pastoral Epistles to be pseudepigraphical, which would allow them to be dated to the 90s, but make their contents doubtful. The fact that the names Claudia and Pudens are separated in 2 Timothy by the name Linus also suggests they were not a married couple.

=== Possible British relatives ===
Claudia's British ancestry has led to speculation that she may have been related to known British historical figures. Given her name, it has been suggested that she was related to Tiberius Claudius Cogidubnus, a British king who ruled as a Roman client in the late 1st century. An inscription by Cogidubnus found in Chichester may mention a "Pudens", although the inscription is damaged so this is not certain, and the way the name is written makes it unlikely that person referred to was a Roman citizen. In a publication of 1614, François de Monceaux popularized the suggestion that Claudia was the daughter of the British resistance leader Caratacus, an idea which has continued to be popular with British Israelite pseudohistory, but beyond the fact that Caratacus is known to have ended his life in Rome, there is no evidence to connect him to Claudia. Theophilus Evans in his Drych y Prif Oesoedd ("Mirror of the Early Centuries", 1740) claims that she went to Rome with Caradog, and that her original name was Gwladys Ruffydd. Drych y Prif Oesoedd became an extremely popular book in Welsh in the 19th century, which helped promote the popularity of the name Gwladys in Wales.

Furthermore, several British kings, such as Tincomarus, Dubnovellaunus, Adminius and Verica, are known to have fled Britain to Rome, and numerous other Britons are likely to have been sent there as diplomatic hostages, not to mention war captives who would have been sold as slaves, offering a variety of possible ancestries. Since Martial is not specific about her ancestry, any attempt to identify her relations can only be conjecture.
