= Commius =

1st century BC Gallo-Brittonic king

King of the Atrebates
- Reign: 57 BC – c. 30 BC (Gallic Atrebates) c. 30 BC – c. 20 BC (Britonnic Atrebates)
- Successor: Tincomarus (northern Brittonic Atrebates); Eppillus (southern Brittonic Atrebates)
- Issue: Tincomarus, Eppillus, Verica
- Military career
- Allegiance: Roman Republic (57–53 BC); Gallic coalition (53–51 BC)
- Conflicts: Gallic Wars; Caesar's invasions of Britain; Battle of Alesia

Commius (Commios, Comius, Comnios) was a king of the Belgic tribe of the Atrebates, initially in Gaul, then in Britain, in the 1st century BC.

During the Roman conquest of Gaul (58–50 BC), Commius was placed in power by Julius Caesar during his conquest of the Belgae in 57 BC and he would be an ally of Caesar, assisting him during his expeditions to Britain and against the Gallic revolts of 54 BC.

In 53 BC, Commius defected to the revolting Gauls and in 52 BC, he would be elected one of the commanders to lead the pan-Gallic force dispatched to relieve Vercingetorix at the Siege of Alesia. After the defeat of Vercingetorix, Commius continued to resist the Romans until he agreed to peace in 51 BC. Some time later, he would travel to Britain and become king of the Atrebates there by about 30 BC.

== Etymology ==
Commius (Commios, Comius, Comnios) has no obvious meaning in Gaulish, though a number of hypotheses have been proposed. Some of these include:

- ‘Friend’ or “ally” because the affix com- often means ‘with’ or “together” (compare to Latin cum and Proto-Germanic *ge-).
- A derivation of the Proto-Celtic verb *kom·binati 'to cut, smite, kill' (as seen in Brythonic *combios 'cutter, smiter, killer', Welsh cymynu, Old Irish com·ben).
- A derivation of the Latin verb commeo (“to move back and forth”) although it would imply that he was remarkably Romanized for a Belgic ruler.

One 19th century proposal holds that Commios isn't a personal name at all but a Gallo-Belgic title for an elective monarch with a number of possible variants either containing the root com- (e.g. comanus, andecombos) or adding epithets (e.g. "comios carmanos", "comios carsisios"). This argument is largely based on some possible examples of these titles that have been found inscribed on Gallic coins. With this interpretation, the Commius mentioned in Caesar's writings was referred to by his title, leaving his true name unknown.

== Gallic Wars ==
=== Ally of Caesar ===
When Julius Caesar conquered the Atrebates in Gaul in 57 BC, as recounted in his Commentarii de Bello Gallico, he appointed Commius as king of the tribe. Before Caesar's first expedition to Britain in 55 BC, Commius was sent as Caesar's envoy to persuade the Britons not to resist him, as Caesar believed he would have influence on the island. However he was arrested as soon as he arrived. When the Britons failed to prevent Caesar from landing, Commius was handed over as part of the negotiations. Commius was able to provide a small detachment of cavalry from his tribe to help Caesar defeat further British attacks. During Caesar's second expedition to Britain Commius negotiated the surrender of the British leader Cassivellaunus. He remained Caesar's loyal client through the Gaulish revolts of 54 BC, and in return Caesar allowed the Atrebates to remain independent and exempt from tax, and in addition appointed Commius to rule the Morini.

However this loyalty was not to last, as related by Aulus Hirtius in the final book of the De Bello Gallico, written after Caesar's death. While Caesar was in Cisalpine Gaul in the winter of 53, the legate Titus Labienus believed that Commius had been conspiring against the Romans with other Gaulish tribes. Labienus sent a tribune, Gaius Volusenus Quadratus, and some centurions to summon Commius to a sham meeting at which they would execute him for his treachery, but Commius escaped with a severe head wound. He vowed never again to associate with Romans.

=== Enemy of Caesar ===
In 52 BC the Atrebates joined the pan-Gaulish revolt led by Vercingetorix, and Commius was one of the leaders of the army that attempted to relieve Vercingetorix at the Siege of Alesia. After Vercingetorix was defeated Commius joined a revolt by the Bellovaci and persuaded some 500 Germans to support them, but this too was defeated and Commius sought refuge with his German allies.

In 51 BC he returned to his homeland with a small mounted war-band for a campaign of agitation and guerrilla warfare. That winter Mark Antony, a legionary legate at the time, ordered Volusenus to pursue him with cavalry, something Volusenus was more than happy to do. When the two groups of horsemen met Volusenus was victorious, but sustained a spear-wound to the thigh. Commius escaped and sued for peace through intermediaries. He offered hostages and promised he would live where he was told and no longer resist Caesar, on the condition that he never again had to meet a Roman. Antony granted his petition.

A 1st century AD source, Sextus Julius Frontinus's Strategemata, tells how Commius fled to Britain with a group of followers with Caesar in pursuit. When he reached the English Channel the wind was in his favour but the tide was out, leaving the ships stranded on the flats. Commius ordered the sails raised anyway. Caesar, following from a distance, assumed they were afloat and called off the pursuit.

This suggests that the truce negotiated with Antony broke down and hostilities resumed between Commius and Caesar. However John Creighton suggests that Commius was sent to Britain as a condition of his truce with Antony - where better to ensure that he never again met a Roman? - and that Frontinus's anecdote either refers to an escape prior to the truce, or is historically unreliable, perhaps a legend Frontinus heard while governor of Britain (75 to 78 AD). Creighton argues that Commius was in fact set up as a friendly king in Britain by Caesar, and his reputation was rehabilitated by blaming his betrayal on Labienus (who deserted Caesar for Pompey in the civil war of 49 - 45 BC).

Commius's name appears on coins of post-conquest date in Gaul, paired with either Garmanos or Carsicios. This suggests he continued to have some power in Gaul in his absence, perhaps ruling through regents. Alternatively, Garmanos and Carsicios may have been Commius's sons who noted their father's name on their own coins.

== King in Britain ==
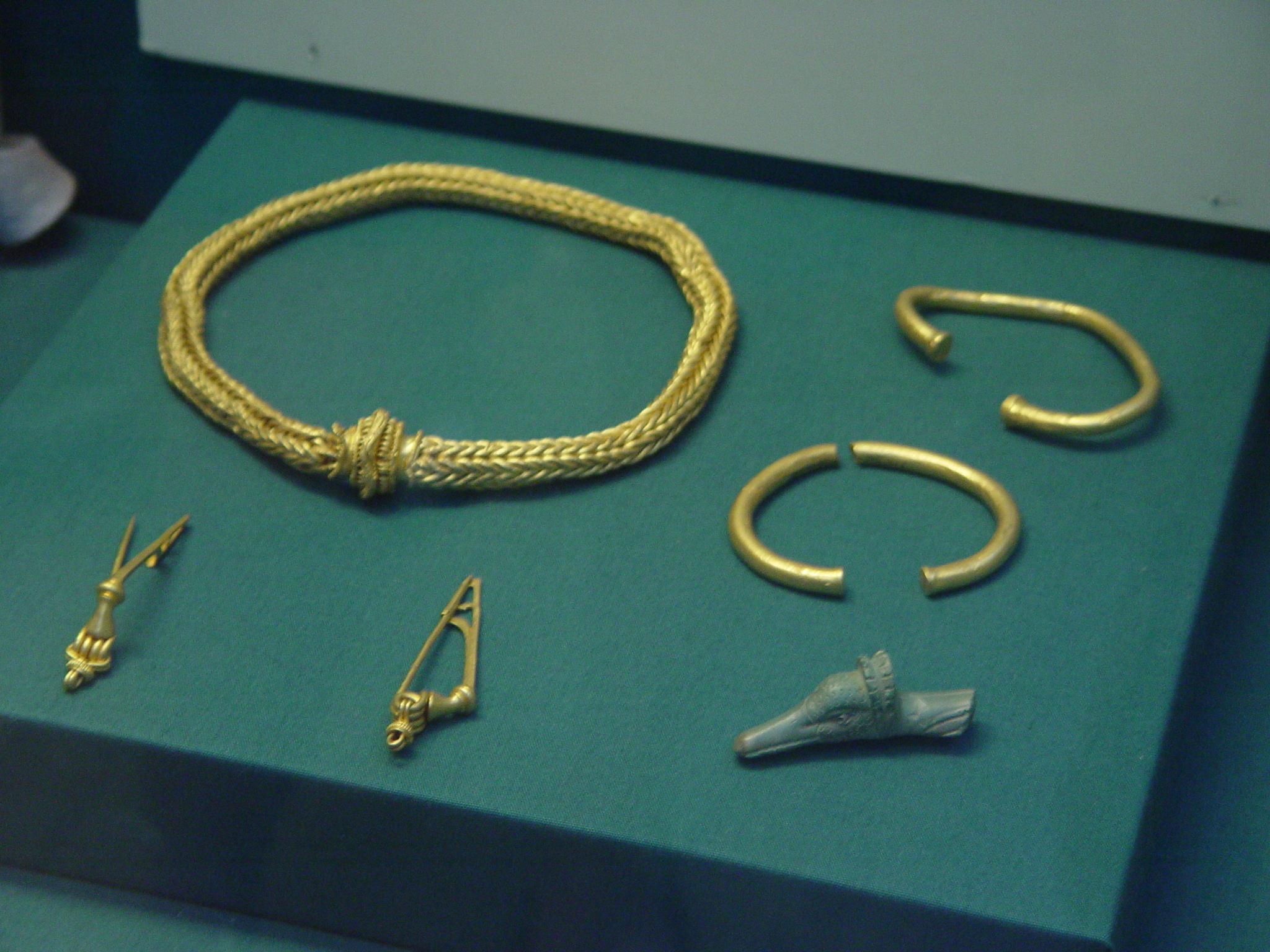
The Winchester Hoard (c. 50 BC). This jewellery might have been a diplomatic gift to a Chieftain ruling in southern Britain, possibly related to Commius of the Atrebates.

By about 30 BC Commius had established himself as king of the Atrebates in Britain, and was issuing coins from Calleva Atrebatum (Silchester). It is possible that Commius and his followers founded this kingdom, although the fact that, when Caesar was unable to bring his cavalry to Britain in 55 BC, Commius was able to provide a small detachment of horsemen from his people, suggests that there were already Atrebates in Britain at this time. Coins marked with his name continued to be issued until about 20 BC, and some have suggested, based on the length of his floruit, that there may have been two kings, father and son, of the same name. However, if Commius was a young man when appointed by Caesar he could very well have lived until 20 BC. Some coins of this period are stamped "COM COMMIOS", which, if interpreted as "Commius son of Commius", would seem to support the two kings theory.

Three later kings, Tincomarus, Eppillus and Verica, are named on their coins as sons of Commius. From about 25 BC Commius appears to have ruled in collaboration with Tincomarus. After his death Tincomarus appears to have ruled the northern part of the kingdom from Calleva, while Eppillus ruled the southern part from Noviomagus (Chichester). Eppillus became sole ruler ca. AD 7. Verica succeeded him about 15, and ruled until shortly before the Roman conquest of 43.

== Popular culture and fiction ==
French Nobel laureate Anatole France wrote a lengthy short story about the Romanization of Belgic Gaul from the point of view of Commius, whose name he recasts in Germanic form as Komm. The story, "Komm of the Atrebates," appears in France's historical fiction collection Clio and can be read in English translation online.

Commius appeared in the 2001 French movie Vercingétorix.

Caesar (Masters of Rome #5) by Colleen McCullough. A minor character in the series but portrayed accurately to history within a historical fiction novel.
