= Eppillus =

Roman client king of the Atrebates tribe of the British Iron Age

- King of the Atrebates
- Reign: c. 20 BC – c. 15 (southern Atrebatic kingdom) c. 7 – c. 15 (northern Atrebatic kingdom)
- Predecessor: Commius (southern Atrebatic kingdom); Tincomarus (northern Atrebatic kingdom)
- Successor: Verica, king of the Atrebates
- Father: Commius

Eppillus (Celtic: "little horse") was the name of a Roman client king of the Atrebates tribe of the British Iron Age. He appears to have ruled part of the territory that had previously been held by Commius, the Gaulish former ally of Julius Caesar who fled to Britain following the uprising of Vercingetorix, or possibly of his son. Eppillus is not mentioned in any historical sources. Coins bearing his name also bear the inscription COMMI.FILI which is generally read as Commios filius indicating at least a claim to be Commius's son.

After Commius's death in about 20 BC, based on numismatic evidence, Eppillus seems to have ruled jointly with another ruler named Tincomarus. The COMMI.FILI inscription also appears on Tincomarus's coins suggesting they could have been brothers. Eppillus's capital was Noviomagus Reginorum (Chichester) in the south of the kingdom, while Tincomarus ruled from Calleva Atrebatum (Silchester) in the north.

Eppillus became ruler of the whole territory a little before 7 AD, and Tincomarus appears as a supplicant to the Emperor Augustus in his Res Gestae, so he would seem to have been driven out in some sort of domestic intrigue. After this, Eppillus's coins are marked "Rex", indicating that he was recognised as king by Rome.

A single stater has been found in Dover bearing the name of Eppillus and an otherwise unknown Anarevito. The relationship between the two is unclear although it has been suggested that they were allied rulers. In about 15 AD, Eppillus was succeeded as king of the Atrebates by Verica. Verica again issues coins with the COMMI.FILI inscription suggesting perhaps a third brother although Verica's possible presence in Rome in 47 AD would have required Commius to have lived a very long life. At about the same time, coins of the Cantiaci stamped with the name Eppillus start to appear in Kent, replacing those of Dubnovellaunus. It is possible that Eppillus was deposed by Verica, fled to Kent and established himself as king there, but equally possible that he was invited to become king by the Cantiaci, peacefully handing the rule of the Atrebates to Verica, or that he died and was succeeded by Verica, and that Eppillus of Kent was another man of the same name.
