= The Novium =

Museum in Chichester, West Sussex, England

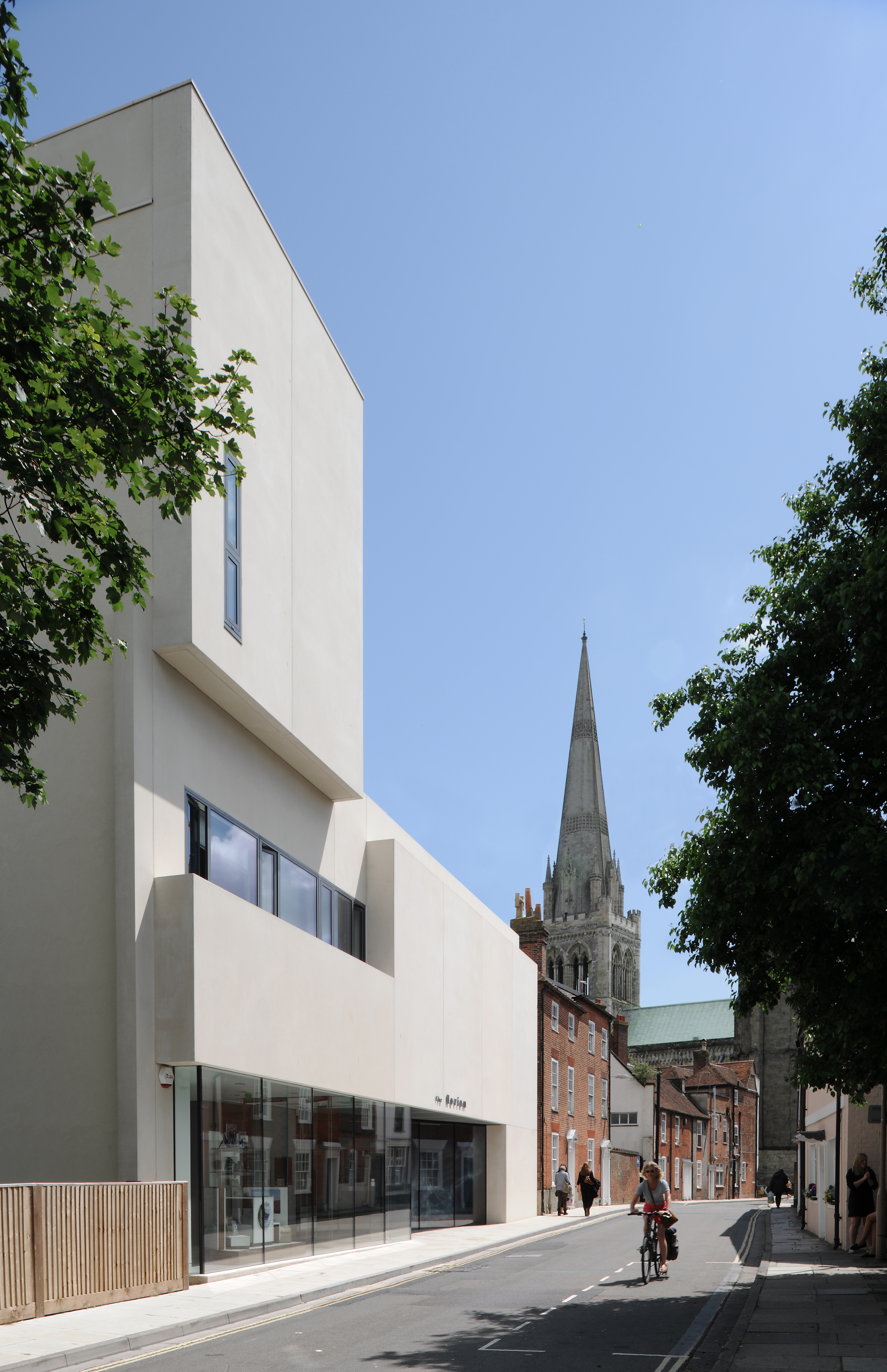
- The Novium, from Tower Street

- Location within Chichester city centre

General information
- Type: Museum
- Location: Tower Street, Chichester, West Sussex
- Coordinates: 50.8374°N 0.7813°W
- Inaugurated: 2011/12

Design and construction
- Architect: Keith Williams

Website
- http://www.thenovium.org

The Novium is a museum in Chichester, West Sussex, southern England. The name comes from the Roman name for the city, Noviomagus Reginorum.

The museum, designed by the architect Keith Williams following an architectural design competition managed by RIBA Competitions, has an area of 1,300 sq m which is approximately 2.4 times the size of the previous museum in Little London. The building is divided into three floors, each of which contains a gallery for exhibitions. It contains a research and learning room as well as a collection store for the social history collection. The museum is built directly over the top of the remains of Chichester's Roman Bath House complex, which are displayed in the ground-floor gallery.

The museum has over 350,000 objects of geological, archaeological and social historic interest. The social history and geological collections is made up of some 50,000 objects which are housed within the new building, whilst the archaeological collection is contained in a purpose-built store within the Discovery Centre located at Fishbourne Roman Palace.

The museum was opened on 8 July 2012.

== History of Chichester District Museum ==
In 1831, Dr John Forbes decided to form a Philosophical and Literary Society in Chichester and, as one of the objectives of this society, Chichester Museum was founded as a Natural History collection. The museum was initially located in the Royal West Sussex Hospital, and the collection was formed from donations from the general public. The Museum was later relocated to 45 South Street after plans for a move to 7 North Pallant were abandoned due to financial difficulty.

In 1851 interest in the museum was motivated by the Great Exhibition in London, and the decision of the Archaeological Institute of Great Britain and Ireland to hold their annual conference in Chichester. This led to a boom of local interest in local heritage, and extensive excavations were carried out in the area.

The 1890s saw a dramatic decline in interest, which led to the unfortunate decision to sell artefacts to support the museum. In 1914 the museum building was commandeered by the army and rumours of wanton destruction of the remaining exhibits. By 1924 there was little left of the museum and the collection had been completely sold.

During the 1930s, a wave of interest led to attempts to resurrect the museum. However, the City Corporation showed little interest in funding the venture. Finally in 1936 a two-week exhibition was displayed in the Guildhall, Priory Park using artefacts that had been collected over the previous three years. This led to the Guildhall becoming a store for artefacts collected over the next 25 years. In 1961 another temporary exhibition was opened in the Assembly Rooms which inspired a local architect to purchase a disused Corn Mill, which he offered to lease to the council for the specific purpose of opening a museum.

In 1962, the new museum opened its doors under the name of Chichester Museum with displays of 18th-century local art, and was formally opened in April 1964 by the Duchess of Richmond. The collection has increased dramatically since its opening due to the extensive archaeological work that has been ongoing in the area. In 1974 the museum was renamed the Chichester District Museum to reflect its direct association with the District Council.

The most recent event in the museum's history was the closure of the Little London Corn Mill in anticipation of the move into the museum's new premises and name as The Novium.

== History of the site ==
Evidence for the Roman baths was first identified in 1960 during works at the rear of Morant's Store, later the Army and Navy store. This first observation identified a section of black and white mosaic along with a fragment of wall. Further archaeological excavation was undertaken in 1972 during the construction of the Post Office Building. At that time the site was scheduled to become a multi-storey car park, the construction of which would have meant the complete destruction of all archaeological layers.

== Key highlights ==
- Chichester Roman Bath House
- Jupiter Stone
- Chilgrove Mosaic
- Colossal Bosham Head of Trajan
- North Bersted Man

In 2019 a bust of King Charles I by Hubert Le Sueur that was originally located on the Chichester Cross was loaned to the museum.
