= North Bersted Man =

Ancient British warrior

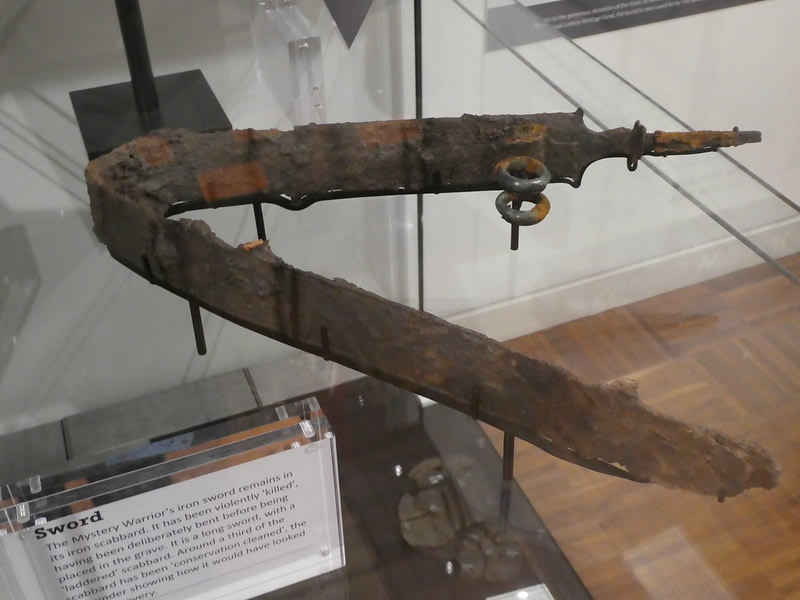
the sword

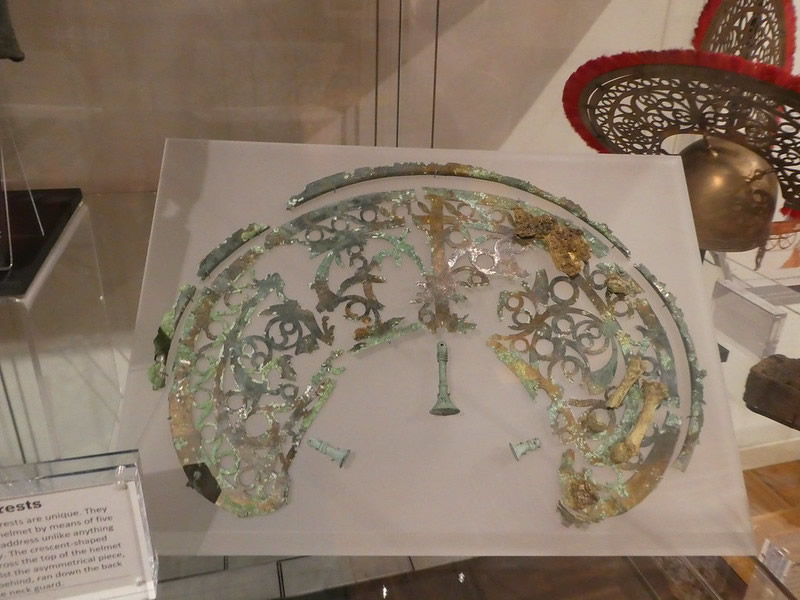
crest on helmet

The North Bersted Man is the modern name given to a warrior found in a burial at excavations by the Thames Valley Archaeological services made in 2008 near North Bersted. The burial contained an exceptional set of objects. It was found within settlement remains that date from the Iron Age to the Roman period. The burial of the North Bersted Man dates to the first century BC.

The buried man was about 45 years old at the age of death and was once about 1.72 m tall. At the head end of the burial, three well preserved pottery vessels were found. Two further vessels were found at the legs. On the left side of the skeleton a set of armors were discovered. They include a sword that was bent when placed into the burial. There was a bronze shield boss, evidently coming from a wooden shield. The wood did not survive. Also found was a spear. The most remarkable object was the helmet of the warrior. It was adorned with two crests that once ran across the top of the helmet and down its back. The crests consist of sheets of bronze and are adorned with an openwork decoration.

The finds from the burial are on display in the Novium Museum in Chichester.
