= Chichester inscription =

1st-century inscribed slab found in England

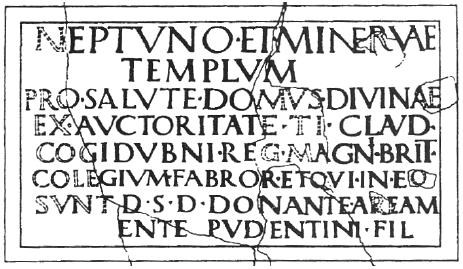
The Chichester inscription

The Chichester inscription, Chichester stone or Pudens stone (RIB 91) is an inscription on a damaged slab of marble, found in Chichester in 1723 and datable to the late 1st century.

As reconstructed by J.E. Bogaers, it reads (reconstructed parts in square brackets):

[N]EPTVNO·ET·MINERVAE

TEMPLVM
[PR]O·SALVTE·DO[MVS]·DIVINA[E]
[EX]·AVCTORITAT[E·TI]·CLAVD·
[CO]GIDVBNI·R[EG·MA]GNI·BRIT·
[COLE]GIVM·FABROR·ET[·Q]VI·IN·E[O]
[SVNT]·D·S·D·DONANTE·APEAM

[...]ENTE PVDENTINI·FIL

Which translates as:

To Neptune and Minerva, for the welfare of the Divine House, by the authority of Tiberius Claudius Cogidubnus, great king of the Britons, the guild of smiths and those in it gave this temple at their own expense ...ens, son of Pudentinus, presented the forecourt.

Another fragmentary inscription, reading [...]GIDVBNVS, was found at the Gallo-Roman town of Mediolanum Santonum (modern Saintes, south-west France), although it is unlikely this refers to the same person.
