= Roman client kingdoms in Britain =

Native tribes aligned with the Roman Empire

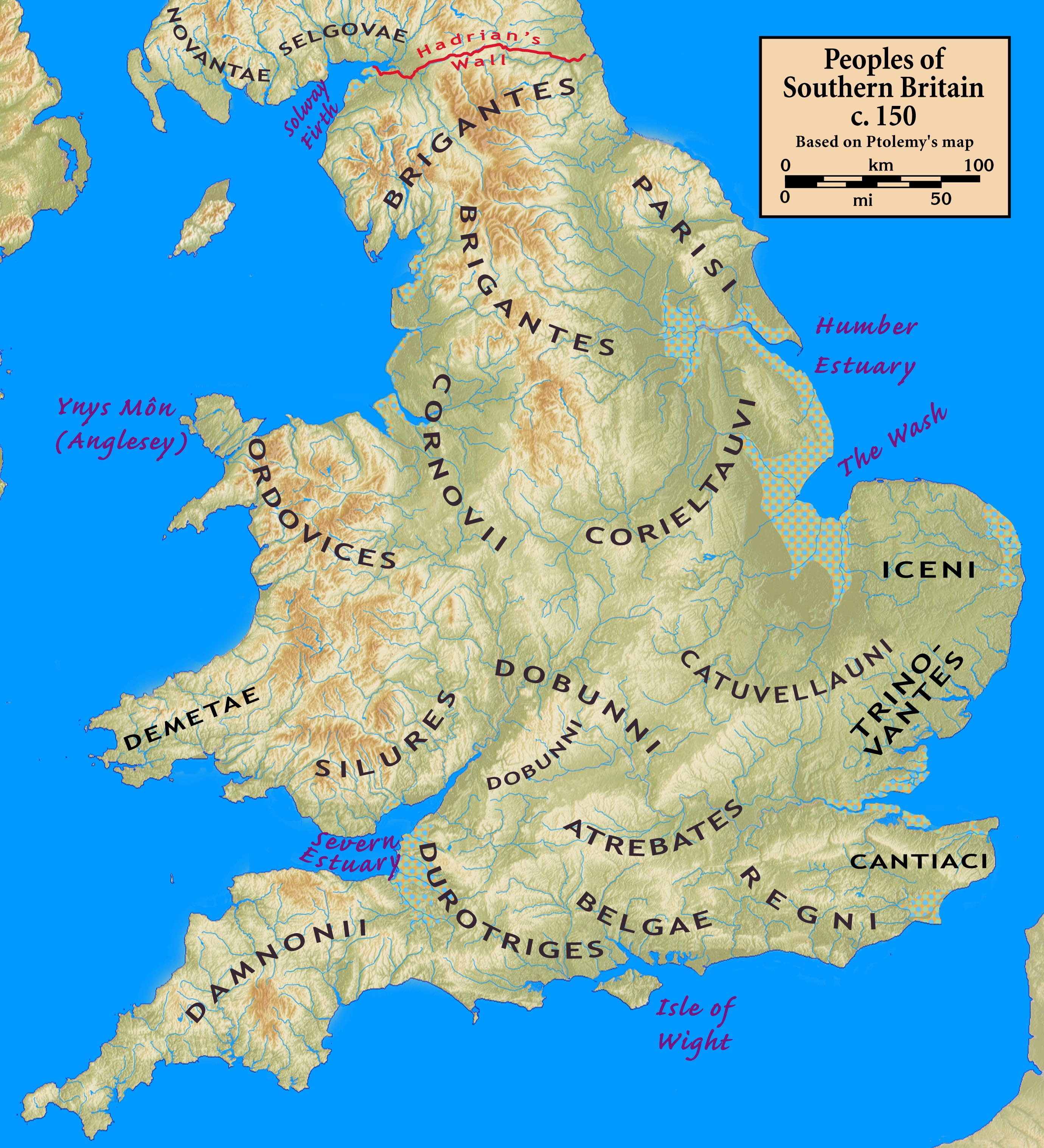
Map of Roman Britain and the client kingdom territories in 150 AD.

The Roman client kingdoms in Britain were native British polities that maintained allied relationships with the Roman Empire and retained local rulers under Roman patronage. Alternatively, the Romans created or enlisted some client kingdoms when influence without direct rule was desirable. Client kingdoms were ruled by client kings. In Latin these kings were referred to as rex sociusque et amicus, which translates to "king, ally, and friend". The relationships between client kingdoms and Rome depended on the circumstances in each kingdom.

The beginnings of the system are found in Caesar's re-enthroning of Mandubracius as king of the Trinovantes, who had been dethroned by Cassivellaunus and then aided Caesar's second invasion of Britain in 54 BC. The system developed further during the following century, particularly under Augustus's influence, so that by the time of the Roman invasion in AD 43 several Roman client kingdoms had become established in the south of Britain. Client kingdoms were annexed when Rome reaffirmed its power in Britain or when client rulers were no longer able to govern their territories effectively.

These were also partially due to the expansion of the Catuvellauni under Cunobelinus in the southeast, and partly as a result of the invasion itself, and included Cogidubnus of the Regni, Prasutagus of the Iceni and Cartimandua of the Brigantes and, probably, Boduocus of the Dobunni. The antecedents of the Regni, the Atrebates, had (in their Gallic and British forms) been client kingdoms of Rome since Caesar's first invasion in 55 BC. In the north of Britain, ongoing border struggles across the defensive walls led to the establishment of buffer states, including the Votadini in Northumberland.

== Invasions of Britain and establishment of client kingdoms ==
Julius Caesar invaded Britain in 55 BC and 54 BC. His initial invasion was unsuccessful, and the Celtic tribes of Britain fought with more strength than expected. In 54 BC the invasion was considered a success but in Caesar's eyes the island yielded little reward and he left without leaving a garrison to watch over his latest conquest.

Client kingdoms were initially established as auxiliary support for the Roman army under Claudius in the expanding empire, but were reimagined as the way for Rome to achieve the power status of a unified empire. Each kingdom had their own systems in place to operate within the Roman model, most notably in relation to trading and defence; and they created a national identity aligned with Roman values.

Evidence exists of rebellion against the empire among client kingdoms like the Catuvellauni and the Iceni tribes. The relationships between the different client kingdoms and Celtic tribes of the area were always changing as loyalties shifted between the indigenous populations and Roman invaders. The changing political relations with the Roman Empire and their conquest of Britain led to conflicts between tribes like the Atrebates and the Catuvellauni in 40 AD. There was also recorded conflicts between the Brigantes tribe and the Catuvellauni in 50 AD.

== Client kingdoms ==
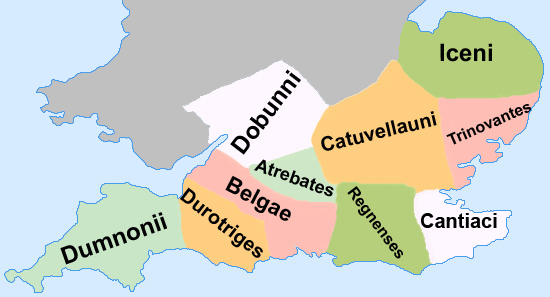
Map of the territory of Client Kingdoms in the South of Roman Britain.

=== Client kingdoms of Southern Britain ===
==== Trinovantes and Catuvellauni ====
Client status: 54 BC -c.39 AD
Location: lands in present-day south-East England

In 54 BC, Julius Caesar set up Mandubracius of the Trinovantes as a client king and established the Catuvellauni as a tributary state of Rome. The centralization of the client kingdoms in southern Britain led to some resemblance of one British society ruled by the Catuvellauni. Coin evidence suggests that since 10 AD, both areas were ruled by Cunobelinus until around 39-40 AD when after his death anti-Roman factions led by his son Caratacus had the most power. In 40 AD, Caratacus overthrew Verica of the Atrebates client kingdom, who was a known ally to the emperor, Claudius. Caratacus led anti-Roman forces against the Roman invasion in 43 AD. The next that was recorded of them was in 50 AD when Caratacus led forces against governor Publius Ostorius Scapula with tribes from Wales. This led to his defeat in 50 AD and search of refuge with the Brigantes, and ultimately a betrayal by Cartimandua in 51 AD. Following Caratacus' defeat, the lands belonging to the Catuvellauni were annexed, the settlement of Verulamium was given municipum status in 50 AD, and its settlers were given a level of citizenship with certain rights.

==== Atrebates, later Regni or Regnenses ====
Client status: 55 BC-70s AD
Location: Roughly modern-day Hampshire and West Sussex (capitals now Silchester and Chichester)

The Belgic Atrebates were led by a semi independent client king, Commius, in Gaul when Caesar left Britain after his first invasion. When Commius began to conspire against Rome, he was forced to flee to Britain in 54 BC. He named himself king of his people and ruled until approximately 20 BC. Commius was succeeded by three of his sons. First, Tincomarus, from 25/20 BC to 7/8 AD. He was more sympathetic to Rome than his father had been, and based on numismatic evidence styled himself rex, implying client kingship status under the Empire. He was expelled in 7/8 AD, seeking refuge with the Romans.

After Tincomarus, Augustus chose to recognize his brother, Eppillus, as the next client king. After ruling jointly with Tincomarus, he apparently became sole ruler c.7 AD, and may have been the one who drove out Tincomarus.

Eppillus was succeeded by another of Commius' sons, Verica, who reigned from Silchester. During his rule, the Atrebates were under pressure from the Catuvellauni to the east. Around 10 AD, Verica was dethroned by the brother of Cunobelinus, Epaticcus. Verica did not regain control until 37 AD. Caratacus, of the Catuvellauni, conquered the kingdom and Verica was driven out of Britain in roughly 40 AD. As a Roman ally, it has been argued that when Verica sought refuge in Rome, he helped convince Claudius to invade Britain.

Following the Roman conquest, Cogidubnus, who was at some point given the Roman names Tiberius Claudius. Cogidubnus ruled the lands of the Atrebates and the Regni, taking the latter as the new name for all people who lived in the regions.

==== Iceni ====
Client status: c.47-60 AD
Location: Roughly modern-day Norfolk

The Iceni tribe were located in the south east region of Britain. The Iceni had a coin system in place before the Roman invasion, and these coins show evidence that a king named Antedios was in power through the Roman Invasion by Claudius in 43 AD. When the kingdom rebelled in 47 AD after an attempt to disarmour the Iceni, it is suggested he was removed from power by Rome and that Prasutagus was installed as king.

Upon Parsutagus' death in 60 AD, he wanted to give half of the power to his daughters and the other half to the emperor. This went against Roman law which dictated the land of the Iceni would be annexed to the emperor, Nero. The Romans seized control and committed assault against Prasutagus' wife Boudica, and her daughters. These actions of the Romans ignited a long lasting revolt throughout multiple British client kingdoms, including the Iceni and Trinovantes kingdoms. This revolt led to the destruction of the municipia of Colchester, Londinium and Verulamium, which were all promptly rebuilt following the suppression of this revolt. The story of Boudica ends with mystery as there are conflicting stories of her death. The territory once ruled by Boudica and Prasutagus was considered part of the Roman province after Boudica's defeat.

=== Client kingdoms of Northern Britain ===
Map of the territories of the Brigantes.

==== Brigantes ====
Client status: c. 46 AD-

Location: Pennines of South Yorkshire to north of the Tyne.

The Brigantes were given client status but were not considered a conquered Celtic tribe, despite accepting the Romans as the governing power. Notable rulers include Client king Venutius and Queen Cartimandua, who joined the ranks of power female leaders, a concept foreign to the Roman invaders. Cartimandua is known for her betrayal of Caratacus after his rebellion in 51 AD, by handing him over to the Roman army. This action caused unrest in the Brigantia areas of Britain, where the people were split between supporting Cartimandua and the Romans by extension, or supporting her husband Venutius and the British rebellion.

Venutius went on to take control of the Brigantes tribe and lead his own rebellion against the Romans and his wife Cartimandua, his supporters eventually forcing Cartimandua out of her land in response to her betrayal of rebel Caratacus.

Over the next century, relationships with the Brigantes tribe shifted and changed. Tensions and war broke out during the conquest of Gnaeus Julius Agricola, who was the governor of Roman Britain from 78 AD- 85 AD. Turmoil with the Brigantes tribe continued into the second century with the construction of Hadrian's Wall and Antonine Wall.

==== Votadini ====
Client status: c.140s-c.410 AD
Location: Present-day southeast Scotland and present-day northeast England, including modern-day Northumberland

The Votadini were a Brythonic people who lived under the direct rule of Rome between Hadrian's Wall and the Antonine Wall from 138 to 162 AD. When the Romans withdrew behind Hadrian's Wall in 164 AD, they left the Votadini as a client kingdom, a buffer zone against the Picts in the north. They maintained client status until the Romans pulled out of Britain in 410 AD. Through a series of linguistic changes, the Votadini became known as the Gododdin, and maintained a kingdom until their defeat by the Angles c.600 AD.

== Bibliography ==
=== Ancient sources ===
- Augustus, Res Gestae Divi Augusti
- Cassius Dio, Roman History
- Ptolemy, Geography
- Suetonius, The Twelve Caesars, Life of Claudius
- Tacitus, Annals

=== Modern scholarship ===
- John Creighton, Coins and Power in Late Iron Age Britain, Cambridge University Press, 2000
- Clive Cheesman, “Tincomarus Commi filius”, Britannia 29 (1998), pp. 309–315

== See also ==
- Iron Age tribes in Britain
- Client kingdoms in ancient Rome
