= Verica =

British Roman client king

- King of Atrebates tribe
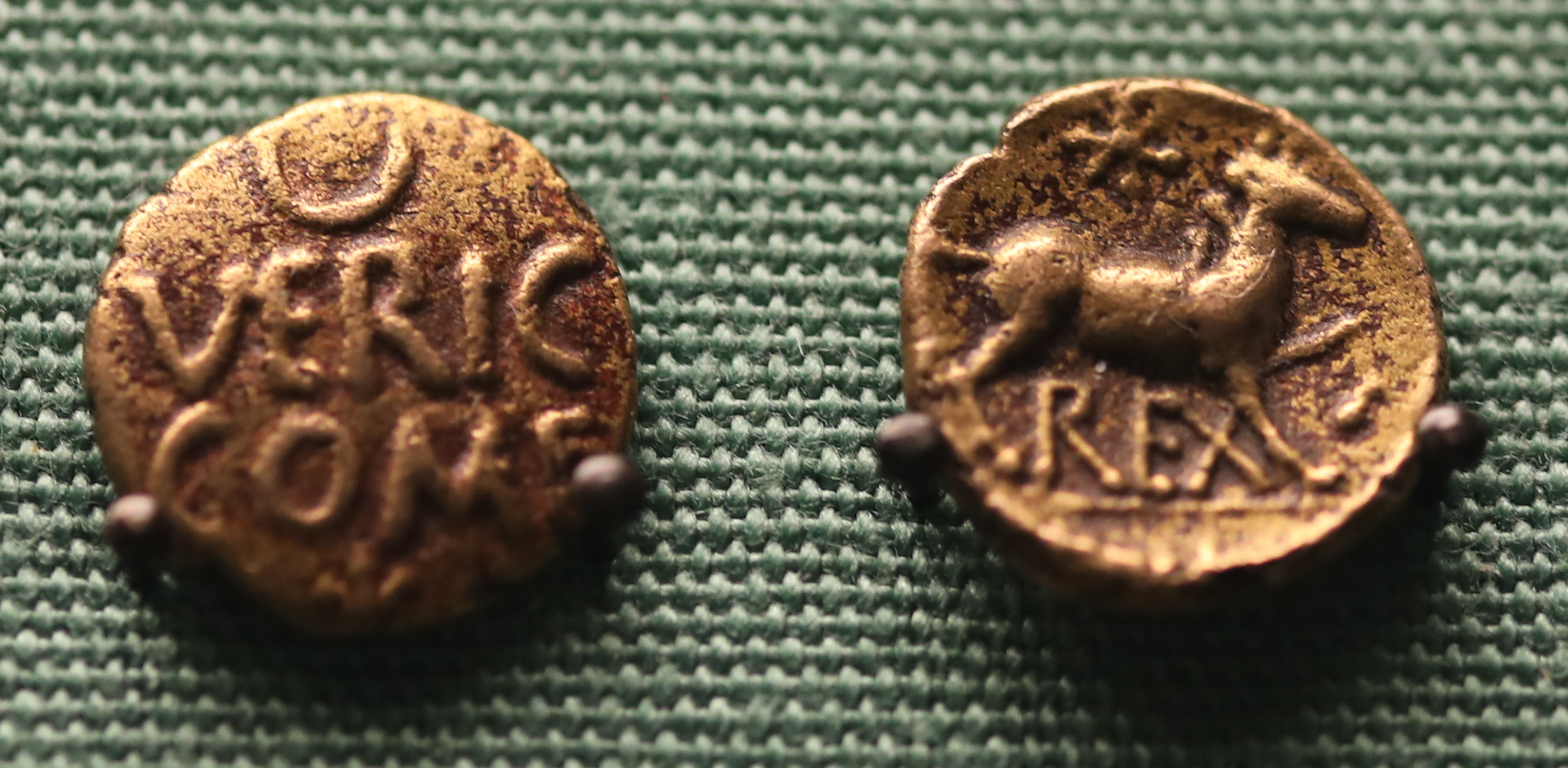
- Stater issued by Verica
- Reign: c. 15 – c. 42
- Predecessor: Eppillus, king of the Atrebates tribe
- Successor: Tiberius Claudius Cogidubnus, king of the Regni or Regnenses tribe
- Father: Commius

Verica (early 1st century AD) was a British client king of the Roman Empire in the years preceding the Claudian invasion of 43 AD.

== History ==
Verica's predecessors likely influenced a large area covering Berkshire, Surrey, western Kent, Sussex, Hampshire, Calleva and the Isle of Wight. From his coinage, he appears to have been king of the probably Belgic Atrebates tribe and a son of Commius. The distribution of his coins also shows that Verica's kingdom was much smaller than that of preceding monarchs, only covering modern Sussex and east Hampshire. Its capital would have been in or close to what became the Roman Noviomagus Reginorum (modern Chichester). He succeeded his elder brother Eppillus as king in about 15 AD, and may also have reigned over the northern Atrebatic kingdom at Calleva Atrebatum, today called Silchester. He was recognised as rex by Rome and appears to have had friendly trade and diplomatic links with the empire. This may have been done in an attempt to restore the kingdom to its former strength.

His territory was pressed from the east by the Catuvellauni, led by Epaticcus, brother of Cunobelinus, who conquered Calleva in about 25 AD. Archaeology bears evidence of a Roman military presence around the Atrebates capital by 30 AD. After Epaticcus's death ca. 35 AD, Verica regained some territory, but Cunobelinus's son Caratacus took over and conquered the entire kingdom some time after 40 AD. According to Welcher, by 42 AD, when Verica was expelled, his kingdom had been reduced to a core area around Chichester and the Manhood Peninsula, perhaps contained within the dykes of the Chichester entrenchments.

Dio Cassius records that "Berikos" (widely considered to be Verica) fled Britain to Emperor Claudius sometime before 43AD due to a revolt. Suetonius refers to demands by the Britons that Rome return "certain deserters". As rex, Verica was nominally an ally of Rome, so his exile gave Claudius an excuse to begin his invasion.

Verica's relationship with Rome has been used to argue for the site of the Roman invasion of Britain as being along the south coast to assist him, rather than being at the traditional spot at Richborough in Kent. Verica's southern Atrebatic kingdom of what is now Sussex and east Hampshire had maintained a good relationship with Rome for many years. Verica is likely to have been seen by the Romans as an ally and a counter-balance to the powerful Catuvellaunian tribe to the north. This may have led to Roman military intervention to support Verica against the Catuvellauni who were becoming a threat to the Roman Empire's north-west frontier. Unlike other nearby areas, the hillforts in the core of Verica's kingdom show no sign of refortification and imply a pro-Roman attitude from the area's inhabitants.

After the invasion, Verica may have been restored as king, but this is not attested in the historical or archaeological record. In any case a new ruler for the region, Cogidubnus, soon appeared. Cogidubnus may have been an heir of Verica who by this time would have been very old.

== Gender ==
While most scholars view Verica as a man, archaeologist Miles Russell has argued that Verica was a woman, citing the (typically feminine) ending -a in the name, the topless horsewomen on Verica's coinage and the title rex sociusque et amicus, which he views as a non-gendered title for rulers of client kingdoms. Roger Tomlin has disputed this, arguing that there is no evidence for the use of the title rex by female client rulers. Regarding Russell's use of coinage as proof that Verica was female, Tomlin said, "It reminds me of the argument that Queen Victoria was really a man, because the reverse of her gold coinage depicts her as a male horseman killing a dragon." Daphne Nash notes that some coins show Verica with an Adam's apple and in male priestly clothes.

== Bibliography ==
- Wacher, John, ed. (2020). Towns of Roman Britain. Routledge. ISBN 9781000117318.
