= Tiberius Claudius Cogidubnus =

1st century British king of the Regnenses or Regni tribe

- King of the Regni or Regnenses tribe
- Reign: c. 43 – c. 80
- Predecessor: Verica (king of the southern Atrebates tribe)
- Successor: Roman Empire

Tiberius Claudius Cogidubnus (or Togidubnus, Togidumnus or similar; see naming difficulties) was a 1st-century king of the Regni or Regnenses tribe in early Roman Britain.

Chichester and the nearby Roman villa at Fishbourne, believed by some to have been Cogidubnus' palace, were probably part of the territory of the Atrebates tribe before the Roman conquest of Britain in AD 43. Cogidubnus may therefore have been an heir of Verica, the Atrebatic king whose overthrow prompted the emperor Claudius to invade. After the conquest, the area formed part of the civitas of the Regnenses / Regni, possibly Cogidubnus' kingdom before being incorporated into the Roman province. The public baths, amphitheatre and forum in Silchester were probably built in Cogidubnus' time.

== Sources ==
In Tacitus's Agricola, published c. 98, where his name appears as "Cogidumnus" in most manuscripts although they can be considered as copies, and "Togidumnus" in one, he is said to have governed several civitates (states or tribal territories) as a client ruler after the Roman conquest, and to have been loyal "down to our own times" (at least into the 70s).

He is also known from an inscription on a damaged slab of marble found in Chichester in 1723 and datable to the late 1st century. As reconstructed by J.E. Bogaers, it reads (reconstructed parts in square brackets):

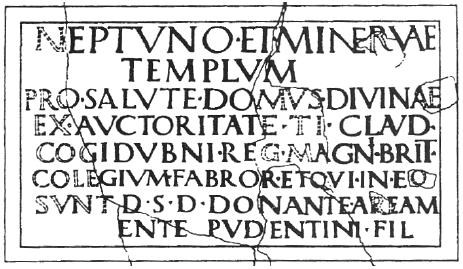
Chichester Inscription

[N]EPTVNO·ET·MIN[ER]VAE
TEMPLVM
[PR]O·SALVTE·DO[MVS]·DIVINA[E]
[EX]·AVCTORITAT[E·TI]·CLAVD·
[CO]GIDVBNI·R[EG·MA]GNI·BRIT·
[COLE]GIVM·FABROR·ET[·Q]VI·IN·E[O]
[SVNT]·D·S·D·DONANTE·AREAM

Which is translated as:

To Neptune and Minerva, for the welfare of the Divine Temple, by the authority of Tiberius Claudius Cogidubnus, great king of the Britons, the guild of smiths and those in it gave this temple at their own expense ...ens, son of Pudentinus, presented the forecourt.

Another fragmentary inscription, reading [...]GIDVBNVS, was found at the Gallo-Roman town of Mediolanum Santonum (modern Saintes, south-west France), although it is unlikely this refers to the same person.

== Naming difficulties ==
In the Chichester inscription, the first two letters of the king's native name, given in the genitive case, are missing. It is usually reconstructed as "Cogidubnus", following the majority of manuscripts of Tacitus, but some, including Charles E Murgia, believe "Togidubnus" is the more linguistically correct form as a Celtic name. The Roman names "Tiberius Claudius" indicate that he was given Roman citizenship by the emperor Claudius, or possibly by Nero, and probably not, as has been suggested, that he was related to Claudia Rufina, a woman of British descent whose marriage to Aulus Pudens in Rome in the 90s is mentioned by the poet Martial.

He is nearly contemporary with Togodumnus, a prince of the Catuvellauni tribe mentioned by Dio Cassius, and the similarity of their names has led some, including Dr Miles Russell of Bournemouth University and the distinguished archaeologist Professor Barry Cunliffe of Oxford University, to suggest that they may be one and the same, thereby making the Fishbourne king a son of Cunobelinus and brother of Caratacus. However the sources do not appear to support this: according to Dio, Togodumnus was killed in 43 in the early stages of the Roman conquest of Britain, whilst Tacitus says that Cogidubnus remained loyal to Rome as a client king into the later part of the 1st century. It is of course not unusual for two people to have similar names (cf. Dubnovellaunus). As the Chichester inscription supports Tacitus, Cunliffe's interpretation would appear to imply an error in Dio's Roman History or in its transmission, and some, including John Hind, have argued that Dio misinterpreted his sources as reading that Togodumnus had died when he had merely been defeated.

== Villa at Fishbourne ==
Barry Cunliffe (the archaeologist who uncovered Fishbourne) has put forward the theory that Fishbourne Roman Palace was Cogidubnus's royal seat. Certainly the early phase of the palace, which dates to around AD 65, could have belonged to him or to one Tiberius Claudius Catuarus, whose inscribed gold ring was found in excavations close by. Miles Russell, however, has suggested that, as the main constructional phase of the palace proper at Fishbourne seems to have been in the early AD 90s, during the reign of the emperor Domitian who built the Domus Flavia, a palace of similar design upon the Palatine Hill in Rome, Fishbourne may instead have been built for Sallustius Lucullus, a Roman governor of Britain of the late 1st century. Lucullus may have been the son of the British prince Adminius.

== Sources ==
- Roger Gale (1722), "An Account of a Roman Inscription, Found at Chichester", Philosophical Transactions (1683–1775) Vol. 32 (1722), pp. 391–400
- Anthony A Barrett (1979), "The Career of Tiberius Claudius Cogidubnus", Britannia 10, pp. 227–242
- J. E. Bogaers (1979), "King Cogidubnus in Chichester: Another Reading of 'RIB' 91", Britannia 10, pp. 243–254
- Peter A. Clayton (ed) (1980), A Companion to Roman Britain
- Sheppard Frere (1987), Britannia: a history of Roman Britain (3rd edition)
- Martin Henig, "Togidubnus and the Roman liberation", British Archaeology, no 37, September 1998.
- Martin Henig (2002, 2012), The Heirs of King Verica, Culture and Politics in Roman Britain
- Miles Russell (2006) Roman Britain's Lost Governor, Current Archaeology, no 204.
- Miles Russell (2006) Roman Sussex.
- Miles Russell (2010) Bloodline: The Celtic Kings of Roman Britain.
