= Tincomarus =

- King of the Atrebates
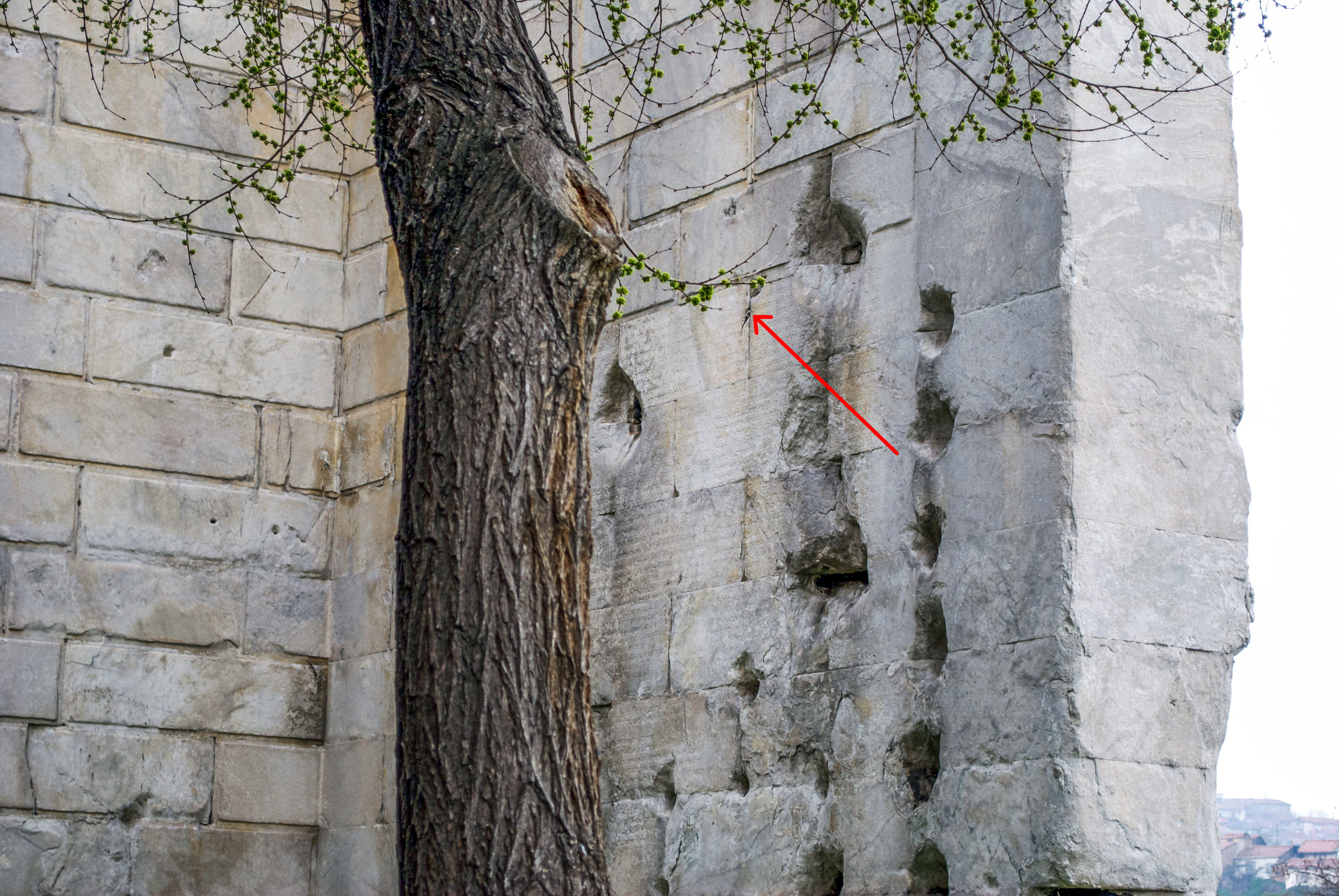
- South wall of the pronaos of the Temple of Augustus and Rome in Ankara, sporting the Monumentum Ancyranum of the Res Gestae Divi Augusti. The section relating to Tincomarus is annotated.
- Predecessor: Commius
- Successor: Eppillus

Tincomarus (a dithematic name form typical of insular and continental Celtic onomastics, analysable as tinco-, perhaps a sort of fish [cf Latin tinca, English tench] + maro-, "big") was a king of the Iron Age Belgic tribe of the Atrebates who lived in southern central Britain shortly before the Roman invasion. His name was previously reconstructed as Tincommius, based on abbreviated coin legends and a damaged mention in Augustus's Res Gestae, but since 1996 coins have been discovered which give his full name.

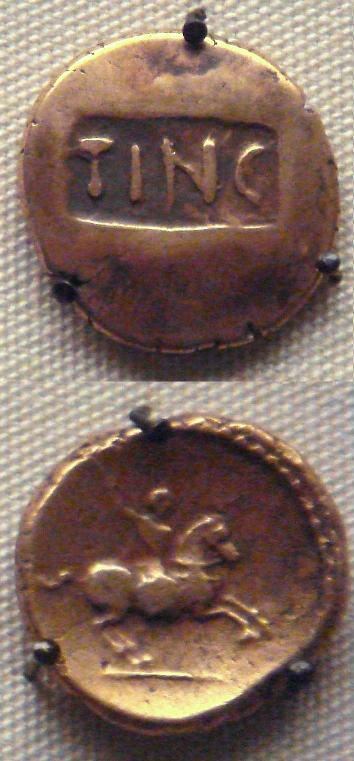
Stater of Tincomarus, king of the Atrebates.

He was the son and heir of Commius and succeeded his father around 25–20 BC. Based on coin distribution it is possible that Tincomarus ruled in collaboration with his father for the last few years of Commius's life. Little is known of his reign although numismatic evidence suggests that he was more sympathetic to Rome than his father was in later years: the coins he issued much more closely resemble Roman types, and are made in such a way they may have come from Roman die-cutters. George C. Boon has suggested that this technical advance was not limited to coinage and represents wider industrial assistance from the Roman Empire. Tincomarus's successors used the term rex on their coins and this indicates that Tincomarus had begun the process of achieving client kingdom status with Rome (see Roman client kingdoms in Britain).

John Creighton argues, based on the imagery used on his coins, that Tincomarus may have been brought up as an obses (diplomatic hostage) in Rome in the early years of Augustus's reign. He compares Tincomarus's coins to those of Juba II of Numidia, who is known to have been an obses, and identifies a coin found in Numidia which may bear the name of Tincomarus's younger brother Verica.

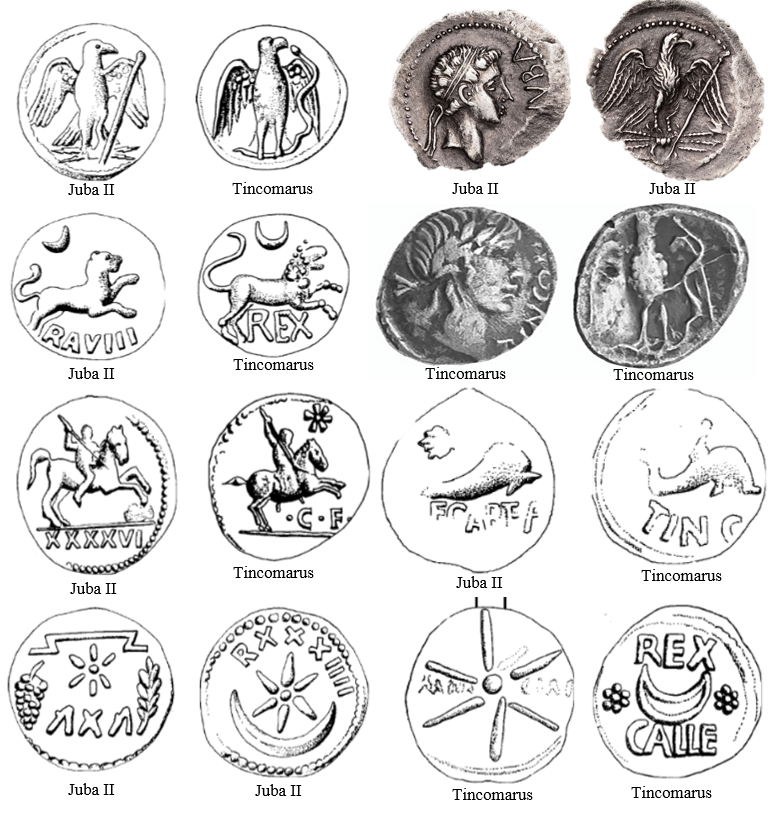
Juba of Mauretania 48 BC – AD 23 and Tincomarus the Atrebatian 20 BC – AD 7 from numismatic evidence appear to have been client Kings of Rome and Tincomarus a possible OBSES diplomatic hostages. Juba II was the only child and heir of King Juba I of Numidia; his mother's identity is unknown. In 46 BC, his father was defeated by Julius Caesar in Thapsus, North Africa and in 40 BC Numidia became a Roman province. (Roller, Duane W. 2003) His father had been an ally of the Roman General Pompey. When Tincomarus's father Commius the Atrebatian was defeated by Julius Caesar in 51 BC in Gallia Belgica, Commius offered hostages and promised he would live where he was told and no longer resist Caesar, on the condition that he never again had to meet a Roman. Mark Antony granted his petition. (Hirtius, De Bello Gallico 8.47–48)

By 16 BC Roman pottery and other imports appear in considerable quantities at Tincomarus's capital of Calleva Atrebatum, today known as Silchester, and it is likely that the Atrebatic king had established trading and diplomatic links with Augustus.

Tincomarus was expelled by his subjects for unknown reasons around AD 8 and fled to Rome as a refugee and supplicant. He was replaced by his brother Eppillus whom Augustus chose to recognise as rex rather than depose and reinstate Tincomarus. Augustus may have planned to use his ally's ejection as an excuse to invade Britain but other, more pressing foreign policy matters probably persuaded him to postpone the move.
