= Aulus Pudens =

Centurion in the Roman army in the late 1st century

Aulus Pudens was a native of Umbria and a centurion in the Roman army in the late 1st century. He was a friend of the poet Martial, who addressed several of his Epigrams to him. He has been identified by some with Saint Pudens, an early Roman Christian.

Martial writes of Pudens' marriage to "Claudia Peregrina" ("Claudia the Foreigner") in Epigrams IV:13, who is likely identical with Claudia Rufina, a Briton he writes of in Epigrams XI:53. Martial also writes of Pudens's passions for young male slaves, his desire to own original copies of Martial's poems, and his ambitions of being promoted to Primus Pilus, the chief centurion of a Roman legion. In one poem (Epigrams VI:58) he writes of a nightmare that Pudens had been killed in action in Dacia.

== Identification as Saint Pudens ==
It has long been speculated that Pudens and his wife Claudia may be identified with the Claudia and Pudens mentioned in 2 Timothy in the New Testament. William Camden's 1586 work Britannia makes this identification, citing John Bale and Matthew Parker. Camden's contemporary, the Vatican historian Caesar Baronius, came to the same conclusion in his Annales Ecclesiastici, and it was followed by ecclesiastical historians such as James Ussher in the 17th century and John Williams in the 19th.

However, beyond the coincidence of names - the name Claudia was borne by every female member of the gens Claudia, a prominent aristocratic Roman family, and Pudens was not uncommon as a Roman cognomen - there is no evidence of a link between the Claudia and Pudens mentioned by Martial and the Claudia and Pudens referred to in 2 Timothy. Martial wrote in the 90s, while 2 Timothy is traditionally dated to the 60s. Some scholars consider the Pastoral Epistles to be pseudepigraphical, which would allow them to be dated to the 90s, but make their contents doubtful. The fact that the names Claudius and Pudens are separated in 2 Timothy by the name Linus also suggests they were not a married couple. Whether or not the Pudens of 2 Timothy is the same person as the saint of that name is also disputed.
