= Noviomagus Reginorum =

Human settlement in the United Kingdom

Coordinates: 50.837°N 0.780°W

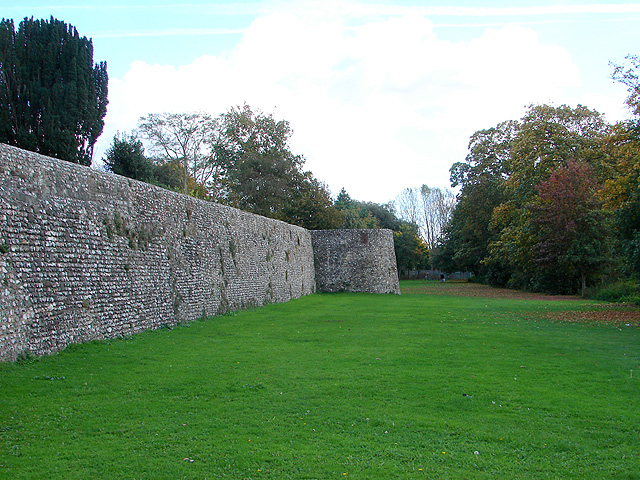
Chichester City Walls. The Roman walls were heavily modified in the Middle Ages, and the facing stones are the result of 19th-century restoration.

Noviomagus Reginorum was Chichester's Roman heart, very little of which survives above ground. It lay in the land of the Atrebates and is in the early medieval-founded English county of West Sussex. On the English Channel, Chichester Harbour, today eclipsed by Portsmouth Harbour, lies 4 1/2 miles (7 kilometres) south.

== Name ==
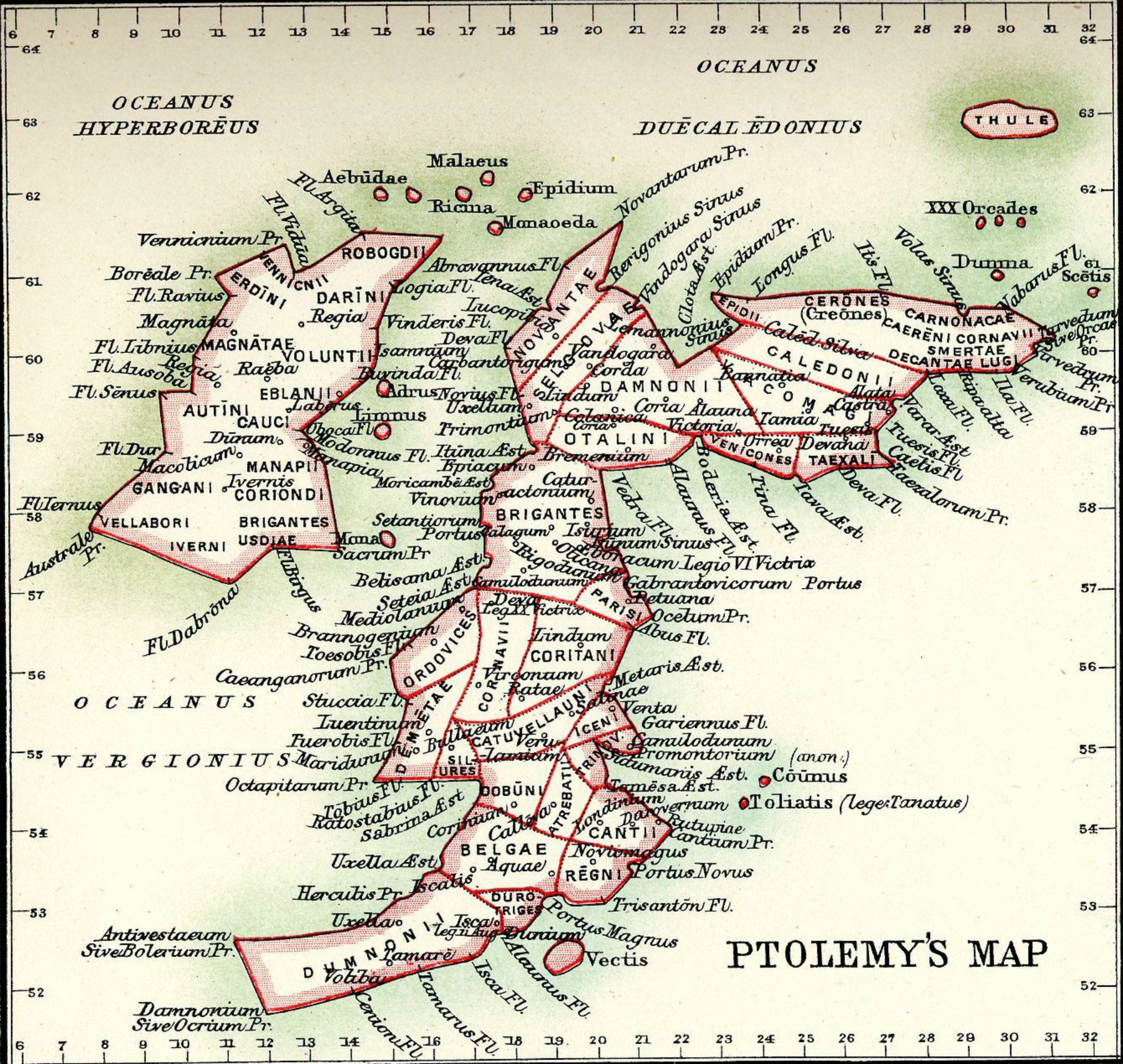
Early modern edition of Ptolemy's map with Noviomagus and the canton of the Regni.

The name Noviomagus Reginorum is actually a modern invention, constructed from 5 pieces of evidence:

1. Ptolemy (2,3,28) mentioned Νοιομαγος (Noiomagos), a πολις of the Ρηγνοι (Polis of the Regnoi - Town of the Regni).
2. Ptolemy's introduction mentions a problem with his source data, that the location of Νοιομαγος 59 miles south of London was inconsistent with its stated latitude, so its location is uncertain, but most likely at the tidal limit of the river now called Arun, not at Chichester.
3. Regno, at the end of iter 7 of the Antonine Itinerary, may refer to Fishbourne Roman Palace, near Chichester.
4. Navimago regentium is at position 39 in the British section of the Ravenna Cosmography, with Fishbourne one of its candidate locations.
5. The people whom Ptolemy called Ρηγνοι are often Latinized into Regni, 'people of the Kingdom', supposedly thus designated by the Roman administration., but there is also a possible meaning like split apart in several languages including Greek.

Many places were (or probably were) called Noviomagus across the Roman Empire and may have been indeed a 'Newmarket', but pinning down exact locations has been difficult. The name element Novio- or Νοιο- has a natural meaning of 'new' in most European languages, but it collides with a meaning close to 'river', especially if spelled Navi-. The name element -magus generally meant a large flat area, such as a plain or a marketplace, but it could get reinterpreted and respelled as Latin magnus 'great'.

== History ==
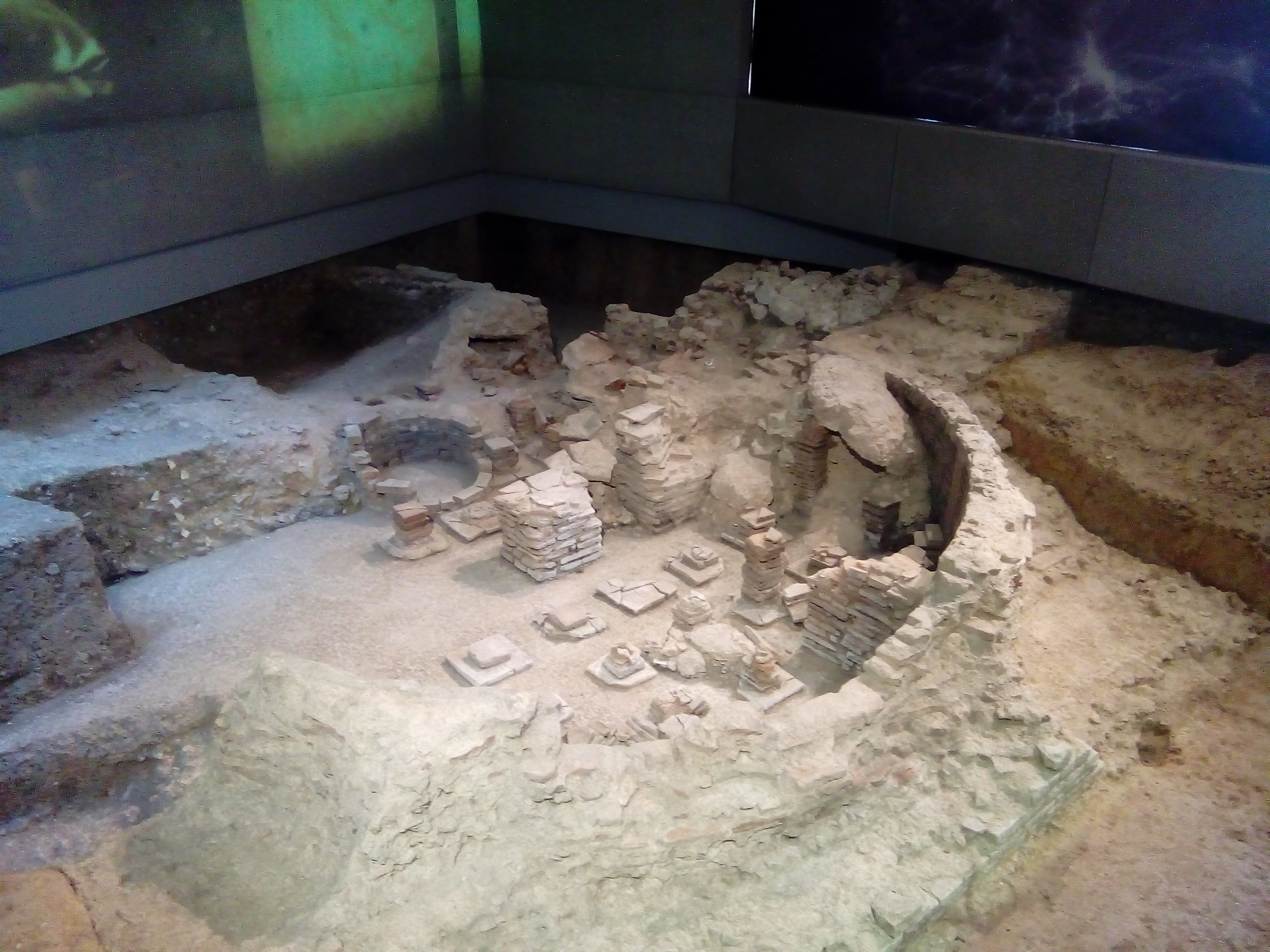
Ruins of a Roman bathhouse in The Novium museum in Chichester

The settlement was first established as a winter fort for the Second Augustan Legion under Vespasian (the future emperor) shortly after the Roman invasion in AD 43. Their timber barrack blocks, supply stores, and military equipment have been excavated. The camp was in the territory of the Atrebates tribe, whose rulers were friendly to the Romans, and was only used for a few years before the army withdrew and the site was developed as a Romano-British civilian settlement.

Kilns have been found from the building in the early 1950s, and a bronze works from the Neronian or early Flavian period; and a dedication to Nero is dated to AD 58. The River Lavant was diverted to provide a public water supply. The town served as the capital of the Civitas Reginorum, a client kingdom ruled by Tiberius Claudius Cogidubnus. Cogidubnus debatably lived in the Fishbourne Roman Palace, a mile to the west. He is mentioned on the dedication stone of a temple to Neptune and Minerva. Other public buildings were also present: public baths are beneath Tower Street, an amphitheatre near the cattle market (this suffered stone-robbing in the late second century AD, by which time it was presumably no longer in use), and a basilica is thought to have been on the site of the cathedral.

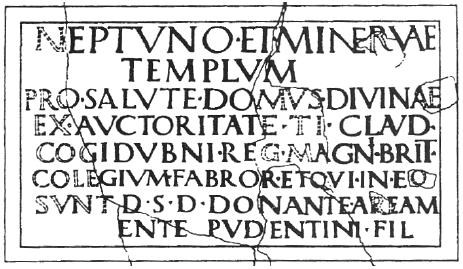
Inscription discovered at Chichester in 1723. From a temple dedicated to Neptune and Minerva, erected on the authority of Tiberius Claudius Cogidubnus.

The town became an important residential, market and industrial centre, producing both fine tableware and enamelwork. In the second century, the town was surrounded by a bank and timber palisade which was later rebuilt in stone. Bastions were added in the early fourth century and the town was generally improved with much rebuilding, road surfacing and a new sewerage system. There were cemeteries outside the east, north and south gates.

== Decline ==
By the 380s, Noviomagus appears to have been largely abandoned, perhaps because of Saxon raids along the south coast. According to the Anglo-Saxon Chronicle the town was eventually captured towards the close of the fifth century, by the legendary Ælle of the South Saxons, and renamed Chichester after Ælle's son Cissa. However, although by the 680s the area between Chichester and Selsey had become the political and ecclesiastical centre of the Kingdom of Sussex, with the king’s residence in Orreo Regis (Kingsham), south west of Chichester, and Wilfrid's religious centre in Selsey, the archaeology does not support Anglo-Saxon settlement of the central city area until the ninth century.

== Remains ==
- The dedication stone of the wall of the Assembly Rooms.
- Part of a fine Roman mosaic may be seen in situ beneath the floor of Chichester Cathedral.
- A second mosaic from Noviomagus may be seen at Fishbourne Roman Palace.
- One of the town's bastions may be seen in the gardens of the Bishop's Palace.
- Chichester's museum The Novium houses many finds from across the city, including the in-situ remains of a Roman bathhouse.

== See also ==
- Chichester Castle – medieval castle established in the north of Noviomagus Reginorum
- Noviomagus of the Kentish, another city by the same name in Roman Britain
