= Cymbeline (film) =

2014 film by Michael Almereyda

- Theatrical release poster
- Directed by: Michael Almereyda
- Written by: Michael Almereyda
- Based on: Cymbeline by William Shakespeare
- Produced by: Michael Benaroya; Anthony Katagas; Michael Almereyda
- Starring: Ethan Hawke; Ed Harris; Milla Jovovich; John Leguizamo; Penn Badgley; Dakota Johnson; Anton Yelchin; Peter Gerety; Kevin Corrigan; Vondie Curtis-Hall; James Ransone; Bill Pullman; Delroy Lindo
- Cinematography: Tim Orr
- Edited by: Barbara Tulliver; John Scott Cook
- Music by: David Ludwig; Bryan Senti
- Production companies: Grindstone Entertainment Group; Benaroya Pictures
- Distributed by: Lionsgate
- Release dates: September 3, 2014 (Venice); March 14, 2015 (United States)
- Running time: 97 minutes
- Country: United States
- Language: English
- Budget: $3.2 million

Cymbeline (also known as Anarchy) is a 2014 American crime thriller film written, produced, and directed by Michael Almereyda, based on the play by William Shakespeare. The film stars Ethan Hawke, Ed Harris, Milla Jovovich, John Leguizamo, and Dakota Johnson.

== Synopsis ==
The story revolves around a war between dirty cops and a biker gang. The king of the bikers has lost his sons and needs his daughter to marry royalty to maintain the bloodline. The new Queen wishes to kill the king and her step-daughter in order to install her own son as the new gang leader. The step-daughter has married a penniless gang member, who is banished from the gang territory by the King. The banished son-in-law is tricked into believing that his wife is unfaithful through a photograph taken while she was sleeping. These many intertwined players will travel through desperate straits before all is resolved.

== Cast ==
- Ethan Hawke as Iachimo, who bets that he can seduce Posthumus' chaste Imogen
- Ed Harris as Cymbeline, King of the Briton Motorcycle Club
- Milla Jovovich as Queen, second wife of the King, who wants to cement her power by having Cloten marry Imogen
- John Leguizamo as Pisanio, Cymbeline's right hand man, tricked by the Queen into delivering (imagined) poison to Imogen
- Penn Badgley as Posthumus, penniless amour, then secret husband, of Imogen. Plans to kill her after he is deceived by Iachimo.
- Dakota Johnson as Imogen, daughter of Cymbeline, calls herself Fidel while later traveling disguised as a boy when searching for her banished love
- Anton Yelchin as Cloten, son of the Queen
- Peter Gerety as Dr. Cornelius, who undermines the Queen’s plans to kill Cymbeline and Imogen by giving her sleeping pills instead of poison.
- Kevin Corrigan as The Hangman
- Vondie Curtis-Hall as Caius Lucius, Chief of the Rome Police Department
- James Ransone as Philario, who befriends the banished Posthumus
- Bill Pullman as Sicilius Leonatus, Posthumus' father
- Delroy Lindo as Belarius, who kidnapped and lovingly raised Cymbeline‘s two sons, Guiderius and Arvirargus, as his own
- Spencer Treat Clark as Guiderius, a (unaware) prince

== Production ==
On July 31, 2013, it was announced that Ethan Hawke was re-teaming with director Michael Almereyda to star in the adaptation of Cymbeline. He would play Iachimo and production was set to start on August 19 in New York City. Anthony Katagas and Michael Benaroya would be the producers of the film. On August 5, it was announced that Ed Harris had signed to star opposite Hawke. He would play the role of King Cymbeline. Penn Badgley joined the cast in the adaptation of Cymbeline to play the role of orphan Posthumus who secretly marries the daughter of King Cymbeline and is banished by the monarch who raised Posthumus as a son.

On August 8, 2013, Milla Jovovich also joined the cast as a female lead; she would play the role of Queen who schemes to move her own son from a previous marriage onto the throne at the expense of the orphan Posthumus and the King’s daughter. Additional cast members added on August 12 included Anton Yelchin and Dakota Johnson, Yelchin would play Cloten, the son of the Queen by a former husband and Johnson would be playing the role of Imogen, the daughter of King Cymbeline from a previous marriage.

== Release ==
Prior to the world premiere of the film, it was announced Lionsgate had acquired all distribution rights to the film. The film had its world premiere at the 71st Venice International Film Festival on September 3, 2014. The film then went to screen at the Busan International Film Festival in South Korea on October 3, 2014. For a short time, the film's U.S. title was Anarchy, but it was changed back to Cymbeline, though in some markets it is known as Anarchy: Ride or Die to avoid confusion with Sons of Anarchy. The film was released in select theaters and through video on demand on March 14, 2015.

== Reception ==
On review aggregating website Rotten Tomatoes, the film has a score of 32%, based on 31 reviews, with an average rating of 4.6/10. On Metacritic, which uses a weighted score, the film has a rating of 54 out of 100 based on 15 reviews, indicating "mixed or average" reviews.
