= Battle of the Medway =

Battle between British tribes and Roman invaders (43 AD)

Coordinates: 51.440°N 0.742°E

- Part of the Roman conquest of Britain
Date	43
Location	River Medway
Result	Roman victory

Belligerents
Roman Empire	British tribes

Commanders and leaders
Aulus Plautius; Galba; Titus Flavius Sabinus; Gnaeus Hosidius Geta; Vespasian	Togodumnus; Caratacus

Strength
Around 60,000	Unknown

Casualties and losses
Unknown	Unknown

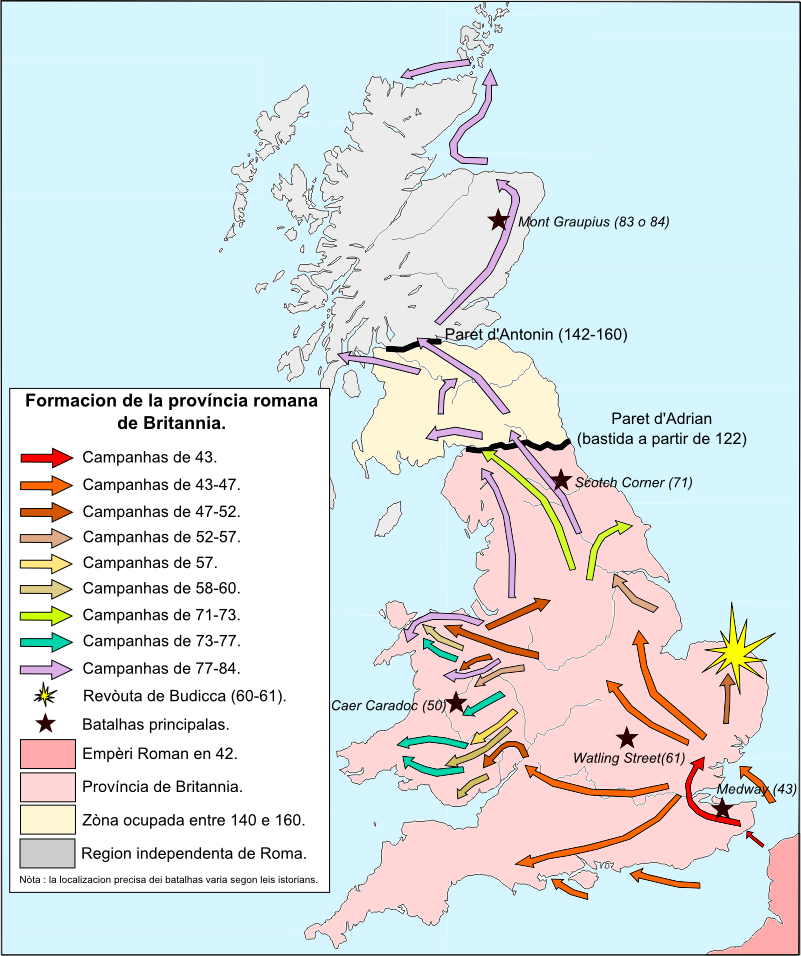
Roman conquest of the British Isles and formation of the province of Britannia.

The Battle of the Medway took place in 43 AD, probably on the River Medway in the lands of the Iron Age tribe of the Cantiaci, now the English county of Kent. This was an early battle in the Claudian invasion of Britain, led by Aulus Plautius.

== Background ==
On the news of the Roman landing, the British tribes united to fight them under the command of Togodumnus and his brother Caratacus of the Catuvellauni tribe. After losing two initial skirmishes in eastern Kent, the natives gathered on the banks of a river further west to face the invaders.

At the same time, the Romans received the surrender of the Dobunni tribe in western Britain. The Dobunni were subjects of the Catuvellauni, and this diplomatic gain was probably a blow to native morale and manpower.

== Chronology ==
There was no bridge over the river where the battle was fought, so a detachment of specially-trained Roman auxiliaries (described by Cassius Dio, the only contemporary source for the battle, as Keltoi, "Celtic") swam across the river and attacked the natives' chariot horses. In the chaos that followed, the bulk of the invasion force, spearheaded by Legio II Augusta under Vespasian, crossed the river, under the overall command of Titus Flavius Sabinus. The natives were surprised that fully armed legionaries were able to cross the river, and Peter Salway has stated even Dio seems taken aback. The Romans were unable to press on to victory immediately, and the first day of fighting ended without a result. During the second day, a daring attack led by Gnaeus Hosidius Geta almost led to the Roman officer being captured. His troops retaliated, however, and put the Britons to flight. Geta was awarded a triumph for securing victory, a rare honour for someone who had not been consul. Given the primary roles taken by Geta and Sabinus on different days, it has been suggested by the historian Malcolm Todd that the Romans were operating as two, or possibly three, battle groups. The invasion force was large, at least one and possibly three legions with auxiliaries. Such a long battle was unusual in ancient warfare.

The Britons fell back to the Thames, a larger river more difficult to cross.

== Location ==
Dio does not name the battle's location, nor the river, but its site is claimed to be on the Medway. The Romans would have used existing trackways as they moved west from Richborough, and the best-travelled prehistoric trackway would have been the route of the later Pilgrims' Way, which forded the Medway at Aylesford. Other theories, however, note that the river is narrow enough at Aylesford not to pose significant difficulties in crossing, and place the battle closer to Rochester, where a large Iron Age settlement stood at the time. Further evidence of a more northerly possible location is at Bredgar, where a hoard of Roman coins from the period was found and has been interpreted as a Roman officer's savings buried for safekeeping before a battle. This hoard could, however, post-date the battle by as much as 20 years. Possibly the Romans followed the future route of Watling Street to the battle, although its role as a pre-Roman communications route is not certain.

== Notes ==
- Frere, S., Britannia (Routledge, 1987)
- Salway, P., Roman Britain (Oxford University Press, 1986)
- Todd, M., Roman Britain (Fontana, 1985)
