= Adminius =

1st century AD ruler of the British Catuvellauni tribe

Adminius, also known as Amminius or Amminus, was a son of Cunobelinus, ruler of the Catuvellauni, a tribe of Iron Age Britain. His name can be interpreted as Brittonic *Ad-minios, "he who is very tender".

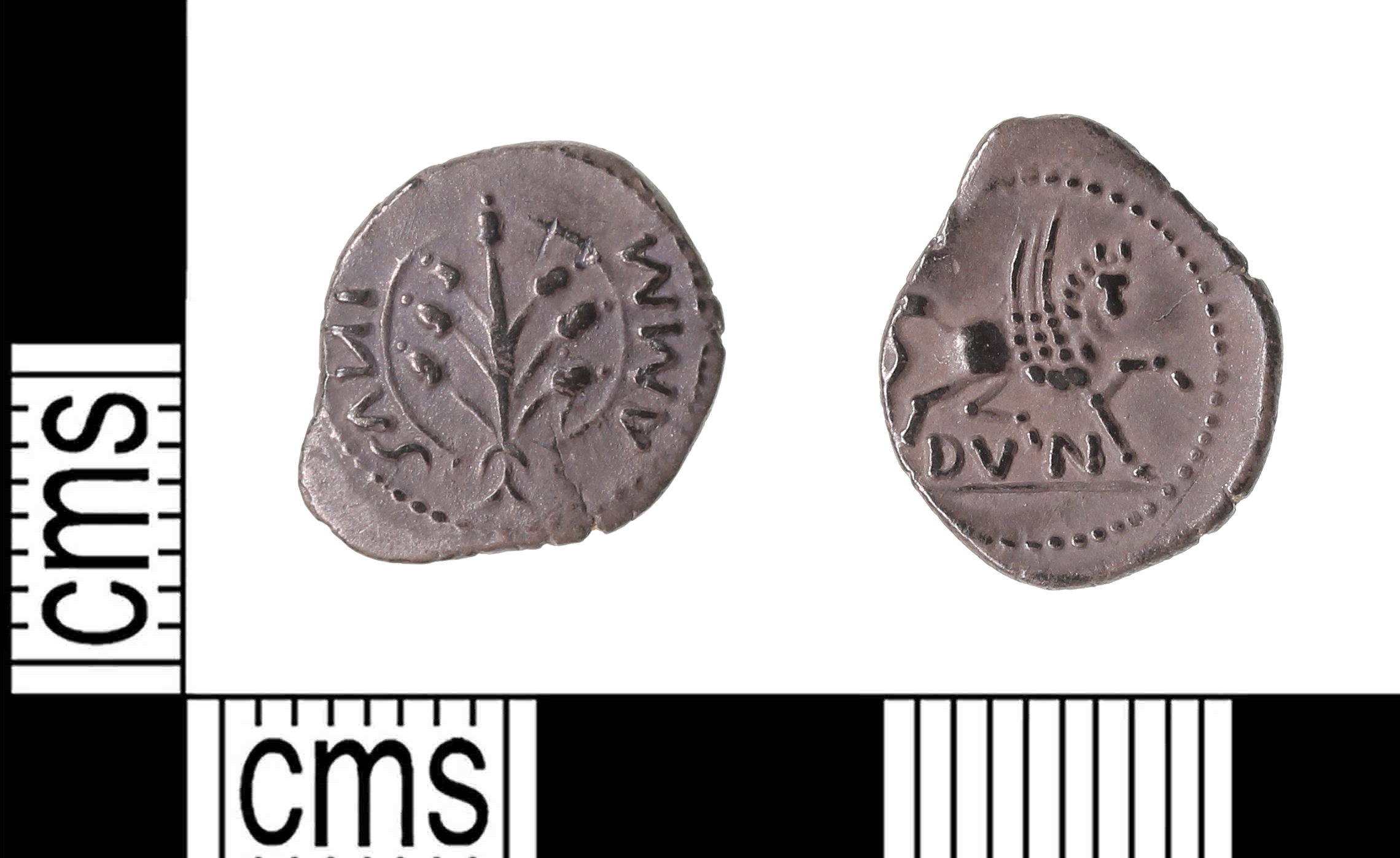
A silver coin inscribed AMMINVS around a central vegetative motif on the obverse with a winged horse on the reverse, found in Kent

Based on coin distribution, where his name appears as Amminus it appears that, in the early to mid 1st century, he was ruler of the Cantiaci of eastern Kent, a kingdom which presumably fell within his father's sphere of influence. Suetonius tells us he was deposed and exiled by his father c. 39 or 40. Cunobelinus had maintained friendly relations with the Roman Empire, and it has been speculated that the elderly king had lost control to an anti-Roman faction led by his other sons, Togodumnus and Caratacus, who may have been instrumental in forcing Adminius out of power. Alternatively, his fall may have been the result of a revolt of the Cantiaci against Catuvellaunian rule. Adminius fled to continental Europe with a small group of followers and surrendered to the Romans. The emperor at the time, Caligula, presented this relatively minor event as a great victory over the foreign tribes of Britain and even penned an extravagant report which he insisted be read to the Roman senate.

Adminius (or Amminus) may have persuaded Caligula that Britain was vulnerable to attack and that an invasion would be an even more famous victory for him. It is further likely that the capture of the British prince was the germ of Caligula's initiative to launch an invasion of Britain. The invasion never happened, either because of Caligula's famous eccentricity, which Roman historians record led him to order his army to collect seashells from Gaulish beaches as war trophies, or because of a mutiny in the invasion force assembled at Boulogne.

In any case, Rome's refusal to return the fugitive Adminius to his father was one of the contributory factors to growing anti-Roman sentiment in Britain, which necessitated Claudius' successful invasion of that land in 43.

An inscription found in Chichester names a "Lucullus, son of Amminus". Dr. Miles Russell of Bournemouth University argues that Sallustius Lucullus, Roman governor of Britain in the late 1st century (and who is also cited from an inscription found in Chichester), was therefore a son of this prince.
