= Caratacus =

1st-century AD British chieftain of the Catuvellauni tribe

- King of the Britons; King of the Catuvellauni
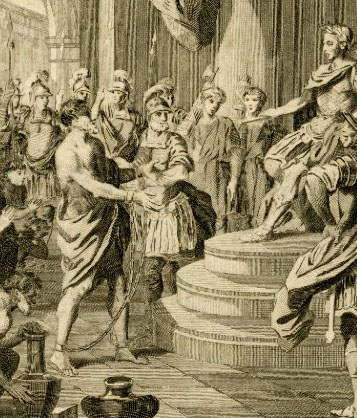
- Caractacus before the Emperor Claudius at Rome, 18th-century print, artist unknown (British Museum)

King of the Catuvellauni
- Reign: 1st century AD, to c. 50
- Predecessor: Epaticcus
- Successor: None (Catuvellauni territory conquered by Claudius)

King of the Britons
- Reign: 43–50
- Predecessor: Cunobelinus
- Successor: Cogidubnus
- Born: c. 10? Probably in Catuvellauni territory
- Died: After c. 50; Rome
- Brythonic: *Caratācos
- Greek: Καράτακος / Καρτάκης
- Father: Cunobelinus
- Mother: Unknown

Caratacus (Note: Brythonic *Caratācos, Middle Welsh Caratawc; Welsh Caradog; Breton Karadeg; Greek: Καράτακος; variants Latin: Caractacus, Greek: Καταράκατος) was a 1st-century AD British chieftain of the Catuvellauni tribe, who resisted the Roman conquest of Britain.

Before the Roman invasion, Caratacus is associated with the expansion of his tribe's territory. His apparent success led to the Roman invasion, nominally in support of his defeated enemies. He resisted the Romans for almost a decade, using guerrilla warfare, but when he offered a set-piece battle he was defeated by Roman forces. After defeat he fled to the territory of Queen Cartimandua, who captured him and handed him over to the Romans. He was sentenced to death but made a speech before his execution that persuaded the Emperor Claudius to spare him. Caratacus' speech to Claudius has been a popular subject in visual art.

== Name ==
Caratacus' name appears as both Caratacus and Caractacus in manuscripts of Tacitus, and as Καράτακος and Καρτάκης in manuscripts of Dio. Older reference works tend to favour the spelling Caractacus.

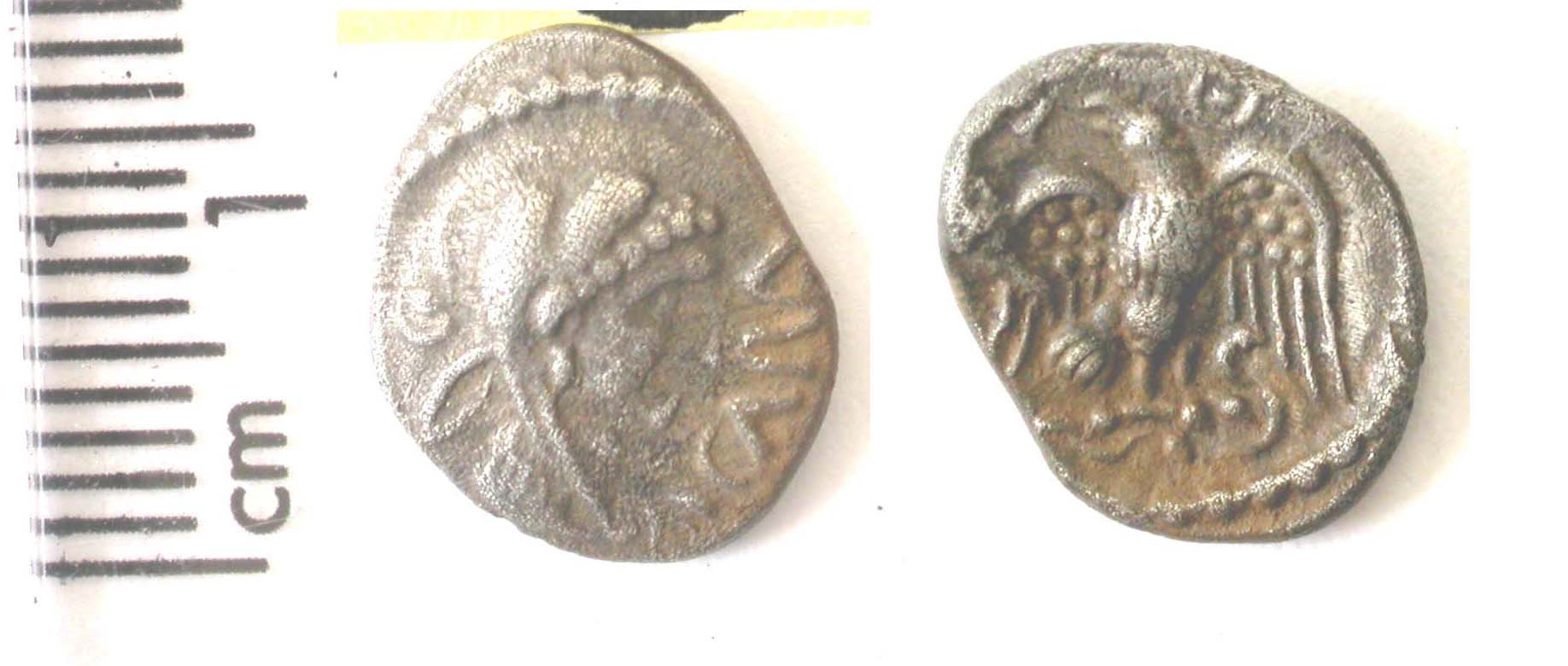
Silver coin attributed to Caratacus, inscribed CARA, with a helmeted head on the obverse and an eagle on the reverse

Coins minted during his rule show the beginning of his name CARA' on the obverse, but some modern scholars agree, based on historical linguistics and source criticism, that the original Common Brittonic form was *Karatākos, pronounced [karaˈtaːkos], cognate with Welsh Caradog, Breton Karadeg, and Irish Carthach, meaning "loving, beloved, dear; friend".

== History ==
=== Claudian invasion ===
Caratacus is named by Dio Cassius as a son of the Catuvellaunian king Cunobelinus (Cunobelin). Based on coin distribution Caratacus appears to have been the protégé of his uncle Epaticcus, who expanded Catuvellaunian power westwards most likely from his palace in Verulam, the heartland of the Catuvellauni, into the territory of the Atrebates. After Epaticcus died in about AD 35, the Atrebates, under Verica, regained some of their territory, but it appears Caratacus completely conquered the Atrebates, since Dio tells us Verica was ousted, fled to Rome and appealed to the emperor Claudius for help. This was the excuse used by Claudius to launch his invasion of Britain in the summer of 43.

The invasion targeted Caratacus' stronghold of Camulodunon (modern Colchester), previously the seat of his father Cunobelinus. Cunobelinus had died some time before the invasion. Caratacus and his brother Togodumnus led the initial defence of the country against Aulus Plautius's four legions, thought to have been around 40,000 men, primarily using guerrilla tactics. They lost much of the south-east after being defeated in two crucial battles, the Battle of the River Medway and River Thames.

Dio reports that Togodumnus was killed (although both Miles Russell and John Hind argue that Dio was mistaken in reporting Togodumnus' death, that he was defeated but survived and was later appointed by the Romans as a friendly king over a number of territories, becoming the loyal king referred to by Tacitus as Cogidubnus or Togidubnus) and the Romans conquered the Catuvellaunian territories. Their stronghold of Camulodunon was converted into the first Roman colonia in Britain, Colonia Victricensis.

=== Resistance to Rome ===
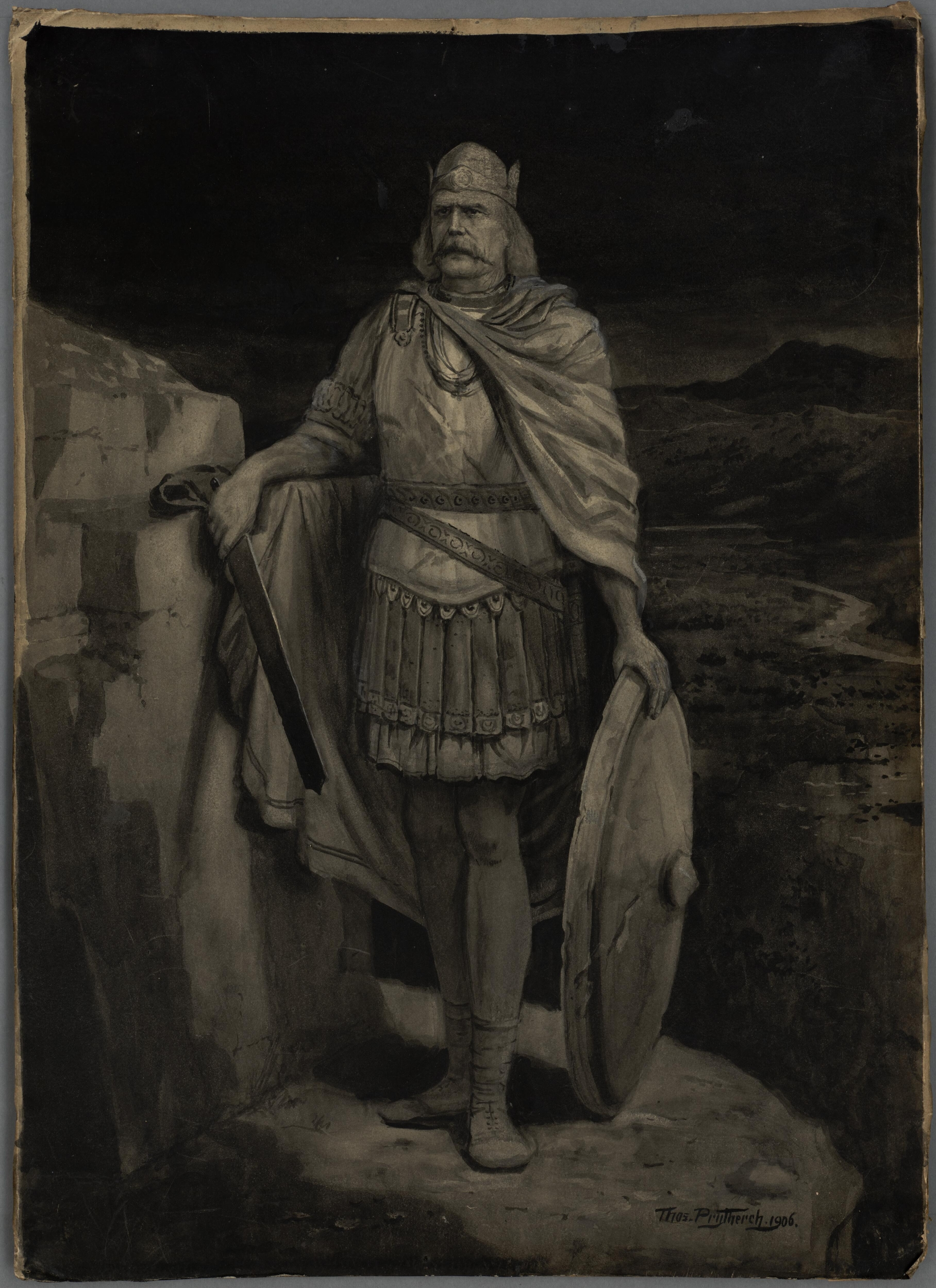
Caradog watercolour painting by Thomas Prydderch

We next hear of Caratacus in Tacitus's Annals, leading the Silures and Ordovices of Wales against Plautius' successor as governor, Publius Ostorius Scapula. Finally, in 50, Scapula managed to defeat Caratacus in a set-piece battle somewhere in Ordovician territory, capturing Caratacus' wife and daughter and receiving the surrender of his brothers. Caratacus himself escaped and fled north to the lands of the Brigantes (modern Yorkshire), where the Brigantian queen, Cartimandua, handed him over to the Romans in chains. This was one of the factors that led to two Brigantian revolts against Cartimandua and her Roman allies, once later in the 50s and once in 69, led by Venutius, who had once been Cartimandua's husband. With the capture of Caratacus, much of southern Britain from the Humber to the Severn was pacified and garrisoned throughout the 50s.

Legends place Caratacus' last stand at either Caer Caradoc near Church Stretton or British Camp in the Malvern Hills, but the description of Tacitus makes either unlikely:

[Caratacus] resorted to the ultimate hazard, adopting a place for battle so that entry, exit, everything would be unfavourable to us and for the better to his own men, with steep mountains all around, and, wherever a gentle access was possible, he strewed rocks in front in the manner of a rampart. And in front too there flowed a stream with an unsure ford, and companies of armed men had taken up position along the defences.

Although the Severn is visible from British Camp, it is nowhere near it, so this battle must have taken place elsewhere. A number of locations have been suggested, including a site near Brampton Bryan. Bari Jones, in Archaeology Today in 1998, identified Blodwel Rocks at Llanymynech in Powys as representing a close fit with Tacitus' account.

=== Captive in Rome ===
After his capture, Caratacus was sent to Rome as a war prize, presumably to be killed after a triumphal parade. Although a captive, he was allowed to address the Roman Senate. Tacitus records a version of his speech in which he says that his stubborn resistance made Rome's glory in defeating him all the greater:

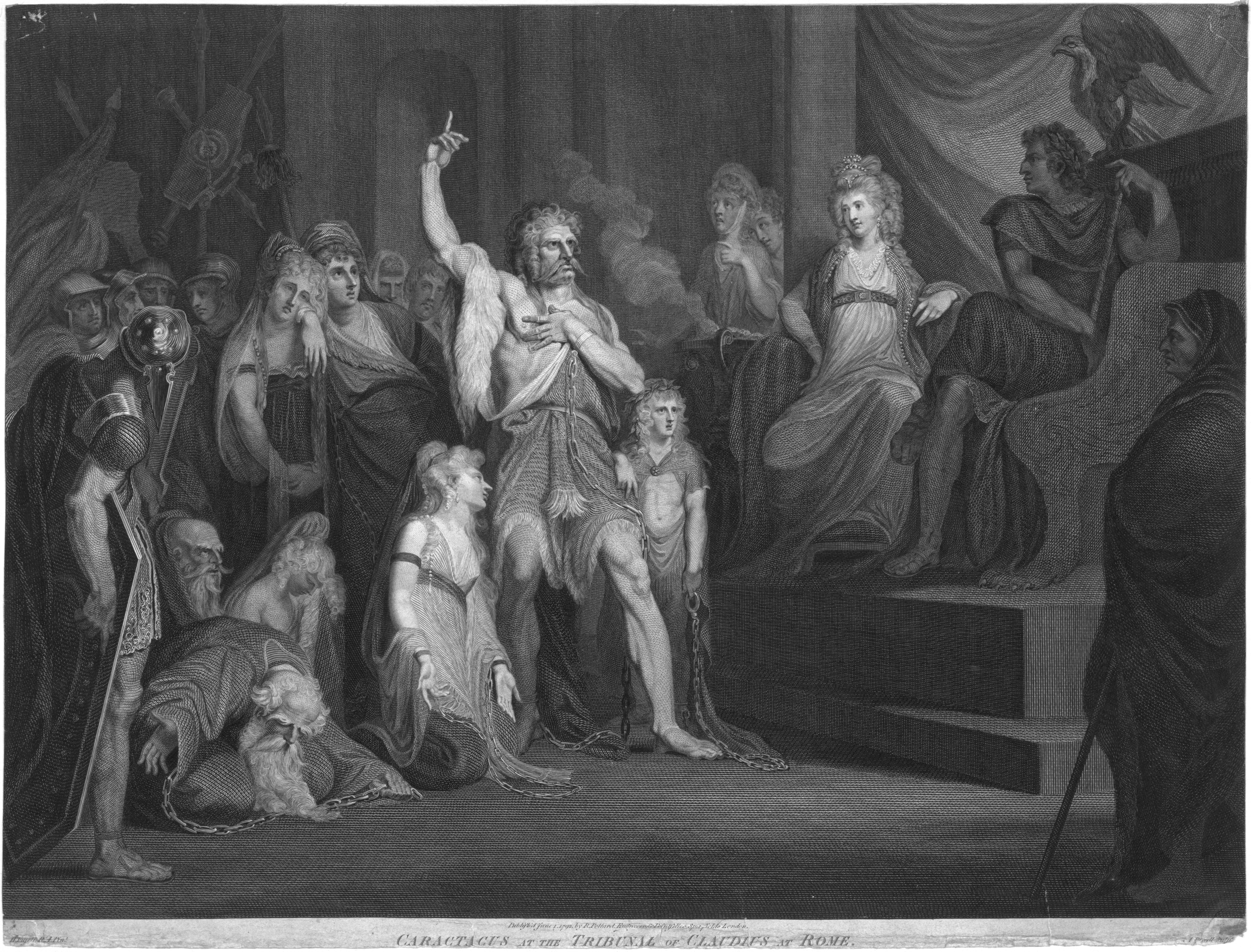
Andrew Birrell (after Henry Fuseli), Caractacus at the Tribunal of Claudius at Rome (1792)

If the degree of my nobility and fortune had been matched by moderation in success, I would have come to this City as a friend rather than a captive, nor would you have disdained to receive with a treaty of peace one sprung from brilliant ancestors and commanding a great many nations. But my present lot, disfiguring as it is for me, is magnificent for you. I had horses, men, arms, and wealth: what wonder if I was unwilling to lose them? If you wish to command everyone, does it really follow that everyone should accept your slavery? If I were now being handed over as one who had surrendered immediately, neither my fortune nor your glory would have achieved brilliance. It is also true that in my case any reprisal will be followed by oblivion. On the other hand, if you preserve me safe and sound, I shall be an eternal example of your clemency.

He made such an impression that he was pardoned and allowed to live in peace in Rome. After his liberation, according to Dio Cassius, Caratacus was so impressed by the city of Rome that he said "And can you, then, who have got such possessions and so many of them, still covet our poor huts?"

== Legend ==
=== Medieval Welsh traditions ===
Caratacus' memory may have been preserved in medieval Welsh tradition. A genealogy in the Welsh Harley MS 3859 (c. 1100) includes the generations "Caratauc map Cinbelin map Teuhant", corresponding, via established processes of language change, to "Caratacus, son of Cunobelinus, son of Tasciovanus", preserving the names of the three historical figures in correct relationship.

Caratacus does not appear in Geoffrey of Monmouth's History of the Kings of Britain (1136), although he appears to correspond to Arviragus, the younger son of Kymbelinus, who continues to resist the Roman invasion after the death of his older brother Guiderius. In Welsh versions his name is Gweirydd, son of Cynfelyn, and his brother is called Gwydyr; the name Arviragus is taken from a poem by Juvenal.

Caradog, son of Bran, who appears in medieval Welsh literature, has also been identified with Caratacus, although nothing in the medieval legend corresponds except his name. He appears in the Mabinogion as a son of Bran the Blessed, who is left in charge of Britain while his father makes war in Ireland, but is overthrown by Caswallawn (the historical Cassivellaunus, who lived a century earlier than Caratacus). The Welsh Triads agree that he was Bran's son, and name two sons, Cawrdaf and Eudaf.

Two hills in Shropshire bear the name Caer Caradoc (Welsh – Caer Caradog), meaning fort of Caradoc, and have popular associations with him. One is an Iron Age hill fort and Scheduled Monument near the town of Clun. It overlooks the village of Chapel Lawn. The other Caer Caradoc is a prominent hill and Iron Age hill fort near Church Stretton, 16 miles (26 km) to the north-east.

=== Modern traditions ===
Caradog began to be identified with Caratacus only after the rediscovery of the works of Tacitus and new material appeared based on this identification. An 18th-century tradition, popularised by the Welsh antiquarian and forger Iolo Morganwg, credits Caradog, on his return from imprisonment in Rome, with the introduction of Christianity to Britain. Iolo also makes the legendary king Coel Hen a son of Caradog's son Saint Cyllin. Richard Williams Morgan said a reference to Cyllin as a son of Caratacus was found in the family records of Iestyn ab Gwrgant and used this as evidence of the early entry of Christianity to Britain: "Cyllin ab Caradog, a wise and just king. In his days many of the Cymry embraced the faith in Christ through the teaching of the saints of Cor-Eurgain, and many godly men from the countries of Greece and Rome were in Cambria. He first of the Cymry gave infants names; for before, names were not given except to adults, and then from something characteristic in their bodies, minds, or manners."

Another tradition, which has remained popular among British Israelites and others, makes Caratacus already a Christian before he came to Rome, Christianity having been brought to Britain by either Joseph of Arimathea or St Paul, and identifies a number of early Christians as his relatives.

One is Pomponia Graecina, wife of Aulus Plautius, the conqueror of Britain, who as Tacitus relates, was accused of following a "foreign superstition", which the tradition considers to be Christianity. Tacitus describes her as the "wife of the Plautius who returned from Britain with an ovation", which led John Lingard (1771–1851) to conclude, in his History and Antiquities of the Anglo-Saxon Church, that she was British; however, this conclusion is a misinterpretation of what Tacitus wrote. An ovation was a military parade in honour of a victorious general, so the person who "returned from Britain with an ovation" is clearly Plautius, not Pomponia. This has not prevented the error being repeated and disseminated widely.

Another is Claudia Rufina, a historical British woman known to the poet Martial. Martial describes Claudia's marriage to a man named Pudens, almost certainly Aulus Pudens, an Umbrian centurion and friend of the poet who appears regularly in his Epigrams. It has been argued since the 17th century that this pair may be the same as the Claudia and Pudens mentioned as members of the Roman Christian community in 2 Timothy in the New Testament. Some go further, asserting that Claudia was Caratacus' daughter, and that the historical Pope Linus, who is described as the "brother of Claudia" in an early church document, was Caratacus' son. Pudens is identified with St. Pudens, and it is asserted that the basilica of Santa Pudenziana in Rome, and with which St. Pudens is associated, was once called the Palatium Britannicum and was the home of Caratacus and his family.

This theory was popularised in a 1961 book called The Drama of the Lost Disciples by George Jowett, but Jowett did not originate it. He cites renaissance historians such as Archbishop James Ussher, Caesar Baronius and John Hardyng, as well as classical writers like Caesar, Tacitus and Juvenal, although his classical citations at least are wildly inaccurate, many of his assertions are unsourced, and many of his identifications entirely speculative. He also frequently cites St. Paul in Britain, an 1860 book by R. W. Morgan, and advocates other tenets of British Israelism, in particular that the British are descended from the lost tribes of Israel.

== In modern culture ==
Caractacus has been referenced in a variety of modern works. The famous "Major-General's Song" from Gilbert and Sullivan's 1879 comic opera, "The Pirates of Penzance" references Caractactus in the following line:

Then I can write a washing bill in Babylonic cuneiform, And tell you ev'ry detail of Caractacus's uniform

Caractacus' relevance to musical comedy continued in the 20th century with Rolf Harris' humorous cumulative song, "The Court of King Caractacus", the chorus of which ends as follows:

Now if you want to take some pictures of the fascinating witches who put the scintilating stiches in the britches of the boys who put the powder on the noses on the faces of the ladies of the harem of the court of King Caractacus...

Other works that reference Caractacus include Edward Elgar's Caractacus, Seamus Kennedy's "King Caractacus", and Mandalaband's (2011) "Palatium Britannicum". Finally, the father in Chitty Chitty Bang Bang is named Caractacus Pott, a borrowing of name from the original historical figure who is otherwise unrelated.

== See also ==
- Caratacus Stone
- Vercingetorix, king and chieftain of the Gallic Arverni tribe which revolted against Rome during the last phase of Julius Caesar's Gallic Wars in 52 BCE

== Notes ==
Regnal titles
Preceded by Togodumnus	King of the Catuvellauni	Roman rule
Legendary titles
Preceded by Metallanus	King of Scotland	Succeeded by Corbredus I
