= Tasciovanus =

Late 1st century BC king of the Catuvellauni tribe

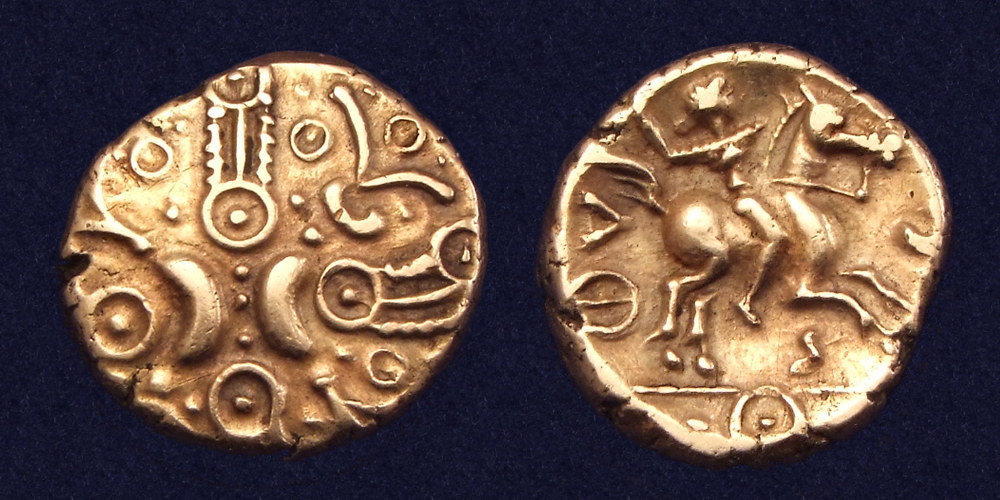
Catuvellauni, Tasciovanus, "Hidden Faces" gold stater. Obv: stylized crescents and wreaths with hidden faces. Rev: Celtic warrior on horse right, carrying carnyx.

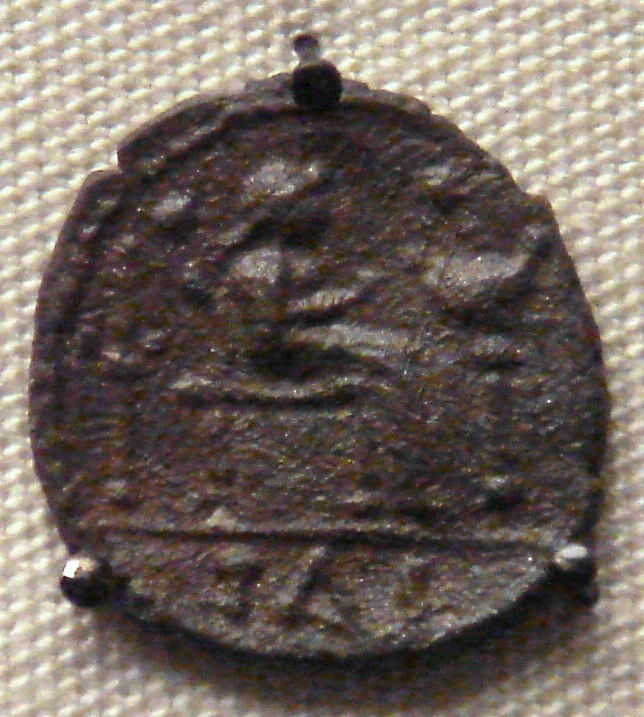
Coin of Tasciovanus, king of the Catuvellauni.

Tasciovanus (died c. 9 AD) or Tasciovantis was a historical king of the Catuvellauni tribe before the Roman conquest of Britain.

== History ==
Tasciovanus is known only through numismatic evidence. He appears to have become king of the Catuvellauni c. 20 BC, ruling from Verlamion (the site of modern-day St Albans). He is believed to have moved the tribal capital to that site from an earlier settlement, near modern-day Wheathampstead. (recent excavations on the southern plateau of the ver valley revealed evidence of occupation, including sherds of mid-first century Roman pottery plus several republican denari minted in Rome between 100 and 80 BC, indicating an established settlement existed from the early first century BC.

For a brief period (c. 15–10 BC) he issued coins from Camulodunum (Colchester), apparently supplanting Addedomarus of the Trinovantes. After this, he once again issued his coins from Verlamion, now bearing the legend RICON, for *Rigonos, Common Brittonic for "great/divine/legitimate king". Some of his coins bear other abbreviated names such as "DIAS", "SEGO" and "ANDOCO": these are generally considered to be the names of co-rulers or subordinate kings, but may instead be mint-marks. He died c. AD 9, succeeded by his son Cunobeline, who ruled primarily from Camulodunum. Another son, Epaticcus, expanded his territory westwards into the lands of the Atrebates.

== Medieval traditions ==
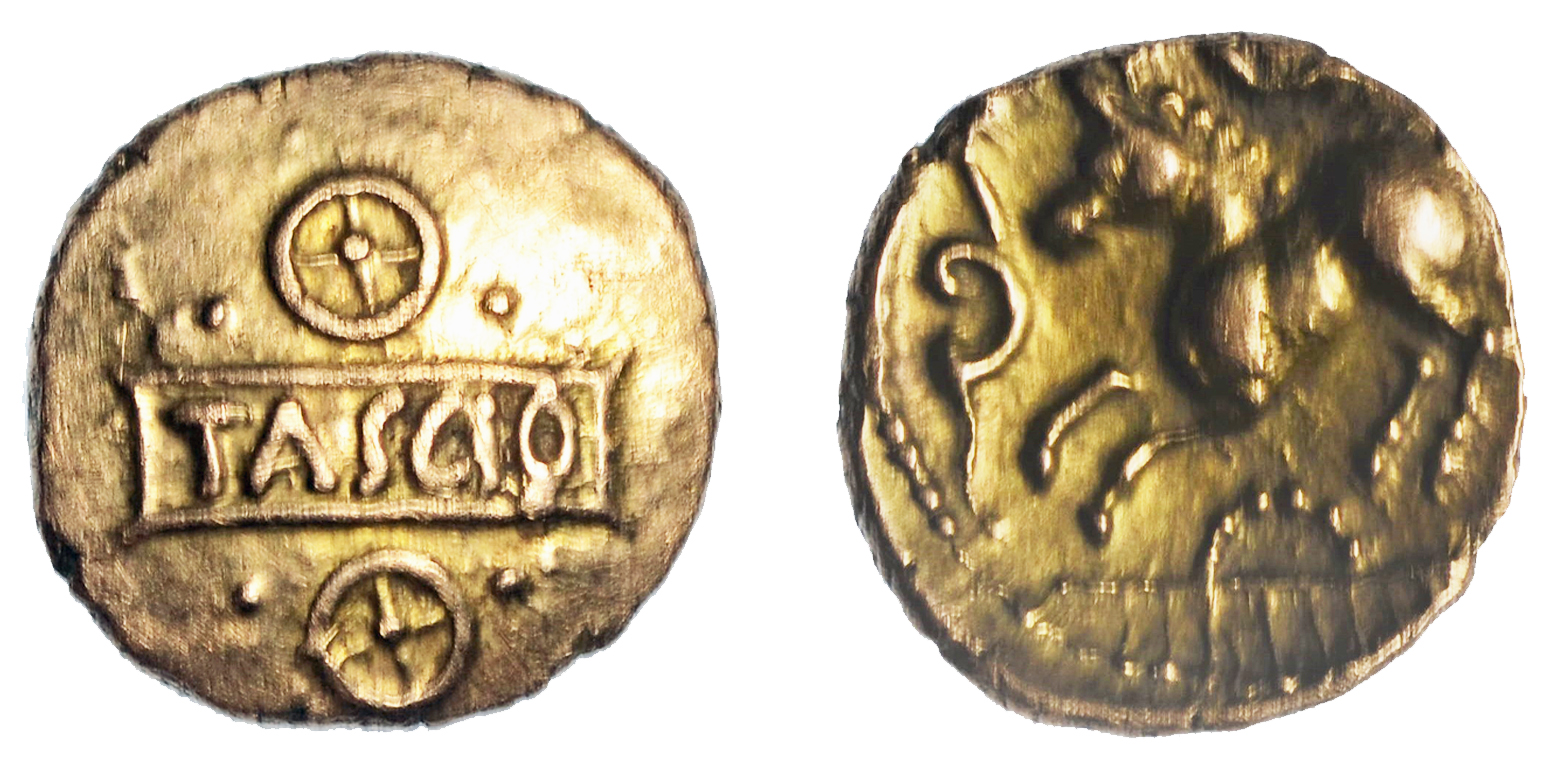
An Iron Age Gold quarter stater of the Kent Region / Cantiaci, struck in the name of Tasciovanus, dating to the period c.AD 5-15, 'Sego Tascio Tablet' type.

A genealogy preserved in the medieval Welsh manuscript British Library Harley MS 3859 (see Harleian genealogies) contains three generations which read "Caratauc map Cinbelin map Teuhant". This is the equivalent of "Caratacus, son of Cunobelinus, son of Tasciovanus", putting the three historical figures in the correct order, although the wrong historical context, the degree of linguistic change suggesting a long period of oral transmission. The spelling Teuhant likely represents what would be Techwant or Teichwant in modern Welsh. The remainder of the genealogy contains the names of a sequence of Roman emperors, and two Welsh mythological figures, Guidgen (Gwydion) and Lou (Lleu).

He appears in Geoffrey of Monmouth's fictional Historia Regum Britanniae (1136) as the legendary king Tenvantius, son of Lud. When his father died, he and his older brother Androgeus were still minors, so the kingship of Britain was given to their uncle Cassibelanus. Tenvantius was made Duke of Cornwall and participated in his uncle's defence of Britain against Julius Caesar. Androgeus went to Rome with Caesar, so when Cassibelanus died, Tenvantius succeeded him as king. He was in turn succeeded by his son Kimbelinus (Cunobeline), who had been brought up at the court of Augustus.

In Middle Welsh versions of Geoffrey's Historia, his name appears as Teneufan and Trahayant.

Under the name of Tenewan ap Lludd (Geoffrey of Monmouth's Tenvantius Welshified), he is claimed as a paternal ancestor in the Mostyn Ms. 117 by the Mathrafal Dynasty (The Lleision Tribal Princes) and therefore subsequently the Kings of Rhwng Gwy Y Hafren (The Iorwerthion Tribal Princes) also.

Regnal titles
Preceded by Cassibelanus	King of the Catuvellauni	Succeeded by Cunobeline
Legendary titles
Preceded by Cassibelanus	King of Britain	Succeeded by Cunobeline
