= Cunobelinus =

1st-century pre-Roman British king

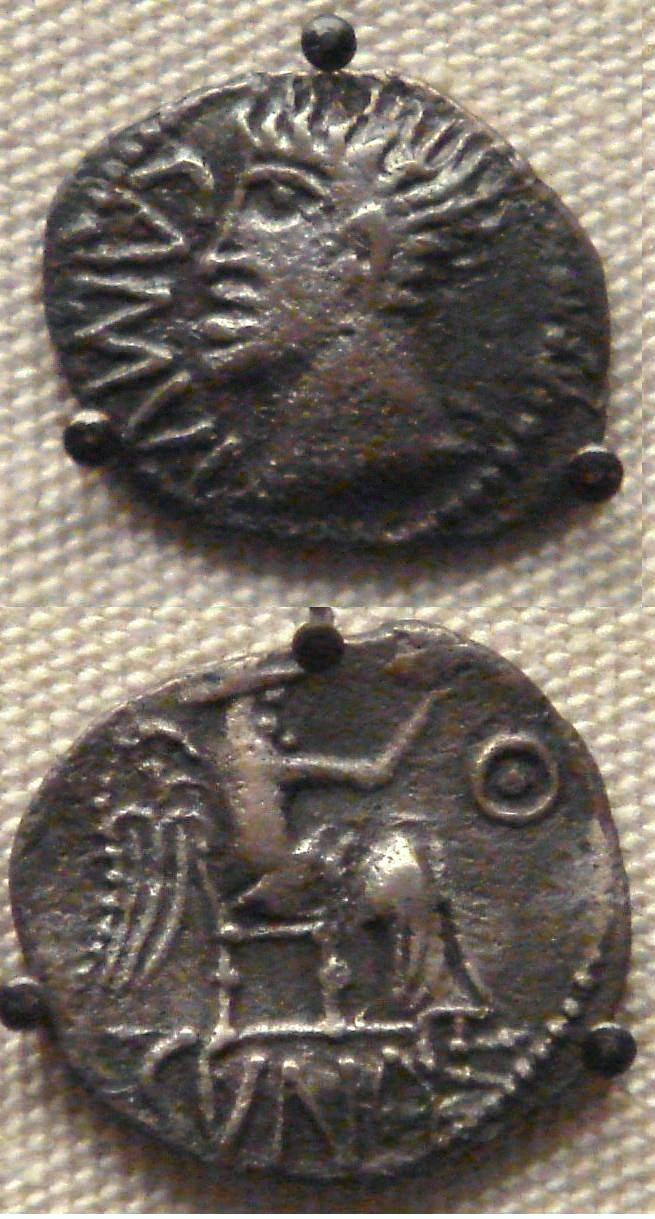
Coin of Cunobeline

Cunobelinus (Common Brittonic: *Cunobelinos, "Dog-Strong"), sometimes anglicized Cunobeline or Cunobelin, was a king in pre-Roman Britain from about AD 9 to about AD 40. He is mentioned in passing by the classical historians Suetonius and Dio Cassius, and many coins bearing his inscription have been found. He controlled a substantial portion of southeastern Britain, including the territories of the Catuvellauni and the Trinovantes, and he was called "King of the Britons" (Britannorum rex) by Suetonius. Cunobelinus may have been a client king of Rome, based on the images and legends appearing on his coins. Cunobelinus appears in British legend as Cynfelyn (Welsh), Kymbelinus (medieval Latin) or Cymbeline, as in the play by William Shakespeare.

== Etymology ==
His name is a compound composed of the Common Brittonic *cuno- "dog" and *belino- "strong", meaning "strong as a dog" or "strong dog".

== History ==
From numismatic evidence, Cunobelinus appears to have taken power around AD 9 after the death of his father Tasciovanus, minting coins from both Camulodunum (Colchester, capital of the Trinovantes) and Verlamion (later the Roman town of Verulamium, now modern St Albans), capital of the Catuvellauni. Some coins from Verulamium call him the son of Tasciovanus, a previous king of the Catuvellauni. Some of Tasciovanus' coins bear the title rigonos, a derivative of the Brittonic root *rīgo- meaning "king". Unlike his father's, Cunobelinus' coins name no co-rulers. His earliest issues are, however, from Camulodunum, indicating that he took power there first, and some have a palm or laurel wreath design, a motif borrowed from the Romans indicating a military victory. It is possible that, following the Roman defeat in the Battle of the Teutoburg Forest in Germania in AD 9, he was emboldened to act against the Trinovantes. The Trinovantes were a Roman ally whose independence was protected by a treaty with Julius Caesar in 54 BC. Still, problems in Germania severely discouraged Augustus's territorial ambitions and ability to defend allies in Britain.

Cunobelinus appears to have maintained quite good relations with the Roman Empire. He used the title Rex (Latin 'king') and classical motifs on his coins, and his reign saw increased trade with the continent. Archaeology shows an increase in luxury goods imported from the continent, including Italian wine and drinking vessels, olive oil, and fish sauces from Hispania, glassware, jewellery, and Gallo-Belgic tableware, which from their distribution appear to have entered Britain via the port of Camulodunum. According to Strabo, he was probably one of the British kings who sent embassies to Augustus. Strabo reports Rome's lucrative trade with Britain: the island's exports included grain, gold, silver, iron, hides, slaves, and hunting dogs.

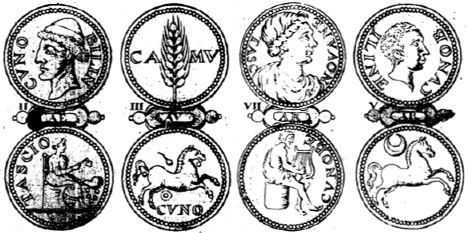
Coins of Cunobelinus

Cunobelinus had three sons, Adminius, Togodumnus and Caratacus, and a brother, Epaticcus, known to history. Epaticcus expanded his influence into the territory of the Atrebates in the early 20s, taking the Atrebatan capital Calleva (Silchester) by about 25. He continued to expand his territory until he died at about 35 when Caratacus took over from him and the Atrebates recovered some of their territories.

Adminius, judging by his coins, had control of Kent by this time. Suetonius tells us that in about 40, he was banished from Britain by his father and sought refuge with the emperor Caligula. Caligula treated this as if the entire island had submitted to him and prepared an invasion of Britain. He abandoned it, however, in farcical circumstances by ordering his soldiers to attack the waves and gather seashells as the spoils of victory.

Cunobelinus died about 40, probably within a year of that date. Indeed, he was dead by 43. The Lexden Tumulus on the outskirts of Colchester has been suggested as his tomb (although the earlier Trinovantian king Addedomarus is another candidate for its occupant). Caratacus completed the conquest of the Atrebates, and their king, Verica, fled to Rome, providing the new emperor, Claudius, with a pretext for the conquest of Britain. Caratacus and Togodumnus led the initial resistance to the invasion. Dio Cassius tells us that the "Bodunni", a tribe who were tributary to the Catuvellauni, changed sides and supported the Romans. This is probably a misspelling of the Dobunni of Gloucestershire, indicating that Cunobelinus's hegemony extended beyond the West Country.

Based on epigraphic evidence, it is possible that Sallustius Lucullus, the Roman governor of Britain in the late 1st century, was his grandson.

== Legend and literature ==
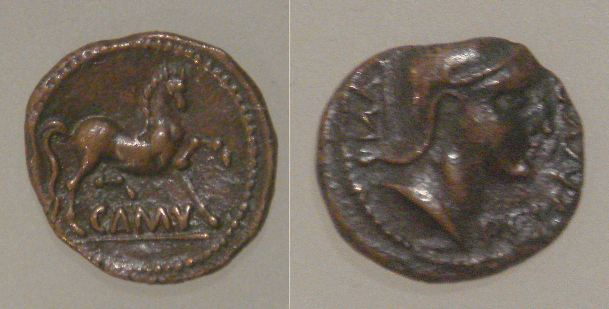
Bronze coins of Cunobelin 1–42 AD. "CAMU" refers to Camulodunon, where the coin was minted. Museum of London.

Cunobelinus's memory was preserved in British legend and beyond. In the early 9th century, in Historia Brittonum, Cunobelinus appears as Bellinus, son of Minocannus, and is described as a British king in the time of Julius Caesar. The names of Cunobelinus and his son Adminius probably became corrupt due to a series of scribal errors in the transmission of the name from Suetonius' Life of Caligula to Orosius's Historia adversus Paganos, the latter of which was a primary source for the author of the Historia Brittonum:

1. Suetonius, Caligula, Ch.44 (early 2nd century): Adminio, Cynobellini Brittannorum regis filio.
2. Orosius, Historia adversus Paganos, vii.5.5 (early 5th century): Minocynobellinum Britannorum regis filium.
3. Historia Brittonum, §19 (early 9th century): Bellinus, filius Minocanni.

In the Welsh Triads and medieval literature such as Branwen ferch Llŷr, the Dream of Macsen Wledig, and Lludd and Llefelys, the Historia Brittonum's "Bellinus son of Minocannus" was transformed into Welsh as Beli Mawr ("Beli the Great") son of Mynogan (also spelled Manogan). Beli, son of Mynogan/Managan, also appears in several medieval Welsh genealogies.

A mid-10th century genealogy preserved in the medieval Welsh manuscript Harleian 3859 contains three generations which read "Caratauc map Cinbelin map Teuhant". This is the equivalent of "Caratacus, son of Cunobelinus, son of Tasciovanus", putting the three historical figures in the correct order. However, the wrong historical context and the degree of linguistic change suggest a long period of oral transmission. The remainder of the genealogy contains the names of a sequence of Roman emperors and two Welsh mythological figures, Guidgen (Gwydion) and Lou (Lleu).

In Geoffrey of Monmouth's Historia Regum Britanniae (composed around 1136), Cunobelinus appears multiple times. Geoffrey borrowed the Historia Brittonum's Bellinus and styles him as the general of Cassibelanus (i.e., Cassivellaunus) in his wars against Caesar (in the Welsh translations of Geoffrey's Historia, the Brut y Brenhinedd, Bellinus becomes Beli, steward of Caswallawn). The next appearance in Geoffrey's Historia is as Heli (son of Cligueillus), the father of the three brothers Cassibellanus, Lud, and Nennius, who reigned for forty years (in the Welsh translations, Beli Mawr is substituted for Geoffrey's Heli). He then appears as Kymbelinus, son of Tenvantius, a mighty warrior raised in the courts of Augustus. He was very friendly with the Roman court: his country was equipped with Roman weapons, and all tributes to Rome were paid out of respect, not requirement. He had two sons, Guiderius and Arvirargus. Guiderius succeeded him but died in the early stages of Claudius's invasion, leaving Arvirargus to carry on the fight.

Geoffrey's story was incorporated into Raphael Holinshed's Chronicles in 1577, where it was found by William Shakespeare and used as the basis of his romance, Cymbeline. Beyond the name, there is virtually nothing in common between Cymbeline's figure and the historical Cunobelinus. The king, under the influence of his wicked second wife, forbids his daughter Imogen to marry Posthumus Leonatus, a low-born but worthy man, preferring that she marry his boorish stepson Cloten, leading to mistaken identity, jealousy caused by false accusations of infidelity and war with Rome provoked by the withholding of tribute, again at the instigation of the queen. In the end, peace between Britain and Rome is re-established, and Cymbeline is reunited with his two sons, Guiderius and Arviragus, who were abducted in childhood by Belarius, a wrongly banished nobleman. Imogen is reconciled with Posthumus. Cloten and his mother, the evil queen, get their just deserts.

Regnal titles
| Preceded by Tasciovanus | King of the Catuvellauni | Succeeded by Togodumnus |
Legendary titles
| Preceded by Tenvantius | King of Britain | Succeeded by Guiderius |
