= Arvirargus =

Legendary British king of the 1st century AD

Arvirargus or Arviragus was a legendary British king of the 1st century AD, possibly based upon a real person. A shadowy historical Arviragus is known only from a cryptic reference in a satirical poem by Juvenal, in which a giant turbot presented to the Roman emperor Domitian (81–96 AD) is said to be an omen that "you will capture some king, or Arviragus will fall from his British chariot-pole".

== Geoffrey of Monmouth ==
Geoffrey of Monmouth's Historia Regum Britanniae (1136) presents a legendary Arvira(r)gus who is contemporary with the emperor Claudius (41–54 AD). However, Geoffrey's work is highly romanticised and contains little trustworthy historical fact, rendering his account of Arvirargus suspect.

According to Geoffrey, Arvirargus is a son of the former king Kimbelinus. He succeeds to the throne of Britain after his elder brother, Guiderius, dies fighting the invading Romans under Claudius. Arviragus puts on his brother's armour and leads the army of the Britons against the Romans. When he learns that Claudius and his commander, Hamo, have fled into the woods, Arvirargus follows him until they reach the coast. The Britons kill Hamo as he tries to flee onto a ship and the place is named Southampton after him. Claudius is able to reassemble his troops elsewhere and he besieges Portchester until it falls to his forces.

Following Hamo's death, Arvirargus seeks refuge at Winchester, but Claudius follows him there with his army. The Britons break the siege and attack the Romans, but Claudius halts the attack and offers a treaty. In exchange for peace and tribute with Rome, Claudius offers Arvirargus his own daughter in marriage. They accept each other's terms and Arvirargus aids Claudius in subduing Orkney and other northern lands.

In the following spring, Arvirargus weds Claudius' daughter, Genvissa, and names the city of Gloucester after her father. Following the wedding, Claudius leaves Britain in the control of Arvirargus. In the years following Claudius' departure, Arvirargus rebuilds the cities that have been ruined and becomes feared by his neighbours. This causes him to halt his tribute to Rome, forcing Claudius to send Vespasian with an army to Britain. As Vespasian prepares to land, such a large British force stands ready that he flees to another port, Totnes, where he sets up camp.

Once a base is established, he marches to Exeter and besieges the city. Arvirargus meets him in battle there and the fight is stalemated. The following morning, Queen Genvissa mediates peace between the two foes. Vespasian returns to Rome and Arvirargus rules the country peacefully for some years. When he finally dies, he is buried in Gloucester, the city he built with Claudius. He is succeeded by his son, Marius.

Geoffrey's legendary Arvirargus appears to correspond to some degree to the historical Caratacus, son of Cunobelinus, who, along with his brother Togodumnus, led the initial resistance to the Roman invasion of 43 AD, and went on to be a thorn in Rome's side for nearly a decade after Togodumnus's death. Welsh versions of Geoffrey's Historia call him Gweirydd and his brother Gwydr.

== Cultural legacy ==
The just husband in Geoffrey Chaucer's The Franklin's Tale (one of the Canterbury Tales) is named Arveragus; however, he appears to have little else in common with the figure of Arviragus.

Arviragus is a character in William Shakespeare's play Cymbeline. He and his brother Guiderius had been kidnapped in childhood by Belarius, a nobleman wrongly banished by Cymbeline, and brought up in secret in Wales, but are reunited with their father and sister Imogen in time for the Roman invasion.

The records of Henry Herbert (Master of the Revels) show that a play called Arviragus was performed at the Court of Charles I on 26 and 27 December 1636.

Legendary titles
Preceded by Guiderius	King of Britain	Succeeded by Marius
