= Bredgar =

Village in Kent, England

Coordinates: 51.311°N 0.696°E

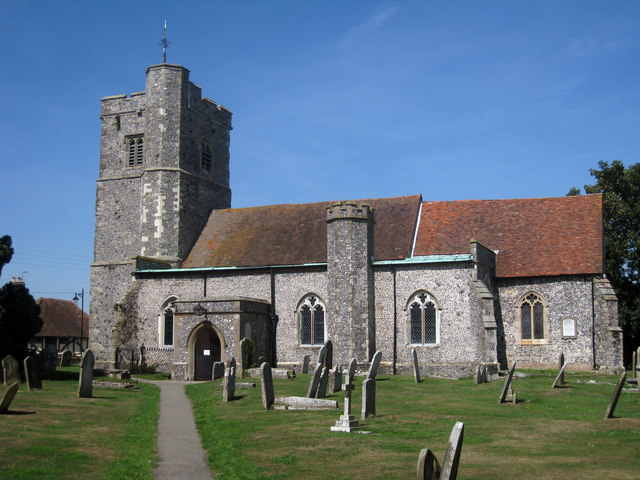

- Location within Kent
- Population: 659 (2011 Census)
- District: Swale
- Shire county: Kent
- Region: South East
- Country: England
- Sovereign state: United Kingdom
- Post town: Sittingbourne
- Postcode district: ME9
- Police: Kent
- Fire: Kent
- Ambulance: South East Coast
- UK Parliament: Sittingbourne and Sheppey

Bredgar is a village and civil parish in the Borough of Swale, Kent, England.

== Location ==
The village lies to the southwest of Sittingbourne on the road between Tunstall and Hollingbourne (previously the B2163). The M2 motorway crosses the parish. Junction 5 is west of the village.

== Population ==
Bredgar has a population of 682 according to the 2021 UK Census figures.

== History ==
A hoard of 34 Roman gold aurei was discovered in the parish in 1957. It is thought to be related to the Claudian invasion, possibly buried by a soldier before the Battle of the Medway.

In the reign of King Henry III (12th century), Robert de Bredgar, resided here and his name appears in an ancient roll of the benefactors to the monastery of Davington (in Faversham). The village was then named after this family.

The village was originally called Bradgare. The parish had around 1300 acres of land, of which one hundred acres are covered by wood. With Tunstall and Bobbing, it was controlled by the Manor of Milton.

== Features ==
The parish includes several Grade II listed buildings. These include Swanton Court, a 16th-century house, and the 15th century Mann's Place. Bredgar House is in the centre of the village, and was constructed in the 18th century. A war memorial was constructed in the village centre by the pond in 1920, to commemorate soldiers fallen in World War I, and later updated for World War II. It was Grade II listed in 2007.

The parish also has its own church, St John The Baptist Church, which is in the diocese of Canterbury, and the deanery of Sittingbourne. It is Grade I listed. King Henry III gave out alms from this church to the leprous women of the hospital of St. James, (alias St. Jacob), near Thanington, near Canterbury. It was refurbished in 2014, including the installation of running water.

The Sun Inn is the village's pub. It has existed since the 16th century and features a large garden.

Bredgar is home to the privately owned Bredgar & Wormshill Light Railway, a steam railway with a collection of various locomotives and rolling stock. The railway is open to the public on Saturdays through the summer.

== See also ==
- Listed buildings in Bredgar
