= Listed buildings in Bredgar =

Civil Parish in Kent, England

Bredgar is a village and civil parish in the Swale District of Kent, England. It contains 49 listed buildings that are recorded in the National Heritage List for England. Of these one is grade I, five are grade II* and 43 are grade II.

This list is based on the information retrieved online from Historic England.

== Key ==
Grade	Criteria
I	Buildings that are of exceptional interest
II*	Particularly important buildings of more than special interest
II	Buildings that are of special interest

== Listing ==
Name	Grade	Location	Type	Completed (Note: The date given is the date used by Historic England as significant for the initial building or that of an important part in the structure's description.)	Date designated	Grid ref. (Note: The grid reference is based on the British national grid reference system, sometimes known as OSGB36, used by the Ordnance Survey.) Geo-coordinates	Notes	Entry number (Note: The "List Entry Number" is a unique number assigned to each listed building and scheduled monument by Historic England.)	Image	Wikidata
Swanton Old House	II				27 August 1952	TQ8755959179; 51°18′03″N 0°41′21″E		1186233	Upload Photo	Q26481495
Barn 15 Yards South East of Bexton Manor	II	Bexon			27 November 1984	TQ8899759448; 51°18′10″N 0°42′36″E		1186005	Upload Photo	Q26481279
Bexon Court	II*	Bexon			27 August 1952	TQ8920959706; 51°18′18″N 0°42′47″E		1186015	Upload Photo	Q26481288
Bexon Manor	II*	Bexon	manor house		27 August 1952	TQ8898459478; 51°18′11″N 0°42′35″E		1069395	Bexon Manor More images	Q17546297
The Malthouse	II	Bexon			27 November 1984	TQ8909359572; 51°18′14″N 0°42′41″E		1343892	Upload Photo	Q26627659
Yew Tree Cottage	II	Bexon			27 November 1984	TQ8901659552; 51°18′13″N 0°42′37″E		1069396	Upload Photo	Q26322362
Oakwood Gate Cottage	II	Bexon Lane			27 August 1952	TQ8858360090; 51°18′31″N 0°42′15″E		1186021	Upload Photo	Q26481293
Barn 15 Yards East of Deans Bottom Farmhouse	II	Deans Bottom			27 November 1984	TQ8627760399; 51°18′44″N 0°40′17″E		1186031	Upload Photo	Q26481304
Dean's Bank Farmhouse	II	Deans Bottom			24 January 1967	TQ8636560316; 51°18′41″N 0°40′21″E		1069397	Upload Photo	Q26322364
Deans Bottom Farmhouse	II	Deans Bottom			24 January 1967	TQ8625360403; 51°18′44″N 0°40′16″E		1343893	Upload Photo	Q26627660
Deans Hill Cottages	II	Deans Hill Road			27 November 1984	TQ8671560354; 51°18′42″N 0°40′40″E		1186048	Upload Photo	Q26481321
Deans Hill House	II	Deans Hill Road			27 November 1984	TQ8668060474; 51°18′46″N 0°40′38″E		1299388	Upload Photo	Q26586796
Little Deans Hill	II	Deans Hill Road			27 November 1984	TQ8673460454; 51°18′45″N 0°40′41″E		1069398	Upload Photo	Q26322366
The Firs	II	Deans Hill Road			24 January 1967	TQ8741060234; 51°18′37″N 0°41′15″E		1343894	Upload Photo	Q26627661
Bush House	II	Gore Road			27 November 1984	TQ8782060490; 51°18′45″N 0°41′37″E		1069399	Upload Photo	Q26322368
Barn 30 Yards South of Little Pett Farmhouse	II	Little Pett			27 November 1984	TQ8600860870; 51°19′00″N 0°40′04″E		1343855	Upload Photo	Q26627622
Little Pett Farmhouse	II	Little Pett			27 November 1984	TQ8602460907; 51°19′01″N 0°40′05″E		1299399	Upload Photo	Q26586805
Carthouse 20 Yards West of Parsonage Farm	II	Parsonage Lane			27 November 1984	TQ8811059981; 51°18′28″N 0°41′51″E		1186068	Upload Photo	Q26481341
Parsonage Farmhouse	II	Parsonage Lane			27 November 1984	TQ8814359991; 51°18′29″N 0°41′53″E		1069400	Upload Photo	Q26322370
The Vicarage	II	Parsonage Lane			24 January 1967	TQ8793660094; 51°18′32″N 0°41′42″E		1299364	Upload Photo	Q26586774
Kingsdown Cottage Nether Cottage	II	Primrose Lane			27 November 1984	TQ8820560841; 51°18′56″N 0°41′57″E		1186072	Upload Photo	Q26481345
Primrose House	II	Primrose Lane			27 November 1984	TQ8807760498; 51°18′45″N 0°41′50″E		1069401	Upload Photo	Q26322372
Barn 15 Yards South of Silver Street Farmhouse	II	Silver Street			27 November 1984	TQ8753560258; 51°18′38″N 0°41′22″E		1343914	Upload Photo	Q26627681
Downings	II	Silver Street			24 January 1967	TQ8773560468; 51°18′44″N 0°41′32″E		1069361	Upload Photo	Q26322302
Mann's Place	II	Silver Street			27 November 1984	TQ8777760874; 51°18′58″N 0°41′35″E		1069360	Upload Photo	Q26322300
North Bank Cottages	II	Silver Street			27 November 1984	TQ8767060382; 51°18′42″N 0°41′29″E		1069362	Upload Photo	Q26322304
Silver Street Farmhouse	II	Silver Street			27 November 1984	TQ8754460284; 51°18′39″N 0°41′22″E		1069363	Upload Photo	Q26322306
Stiff Street Farmhouse	II	Stiff Street			27 November 1984	TQ8730361030; 51°19′03″N 0°41′11″E		1069364	Upload Photo	Q26322308
Barn, 15 Yards North East of Downsell's Cottage	II	Swanton Street			27 November 1984	TQ8775359521; 51°18′14″N 0°41′31″E		1319918	Upload Photo	Q26605976
Downsells	II	Swanton Street			27 November 1984	TQ8769659476; 51°18′12″N 0°41′28″E		1319895	Upload Photo	Q26605953
Downsells Cottages	II	1 and 2, Swanton Street			27 November 1984	TQ8772559521; 51°18′14″N 0°41′30″E		1343879	Upload Photo	Q26627647
Hill House	II	Swanton Street			27 November 1984	TQ8751959151; 51°18′02″N 0°41′19″E		1343878	Upload Photo	Q26627646
Swanton Court	II	Swanton Street			27 November 1984	TQ8713758758; 51°17′50″N 0°40′58″E		1116488	Upload Photo	Q26410091
Swanton Street Cottages	II	1 and 3, Swanton Street			27 November 1984	TQ8758659294; 51°18′07″N 0°41′22″E		1069370	Upload Photo	Q26322318
Swanton Street Farmhouse	II*	Swanton Street			27 August 1952	TQ8755059319; 51°18′08″N 0°41′21″E		1069371	Upload Photo	Q17546281
Barn 20 Yards South West of Gibben's Farm Bungalow	II	The Street			27 November 1984	TQ8810160364; 51°18′41″N 0°41′51″E		1343875	Upload Photo	Q26627643
Bredgar House	II	The Street			24 January 1967	TQ8806060432; 51°18′43″N 0°41′49″E		1069365	Upload Photo	Q26322310
Bredgar War Memorial	II	The Street			5 November 2007	TQ8803660461; 51°18′44″N 0°41′48″E		1392296	Upload Photo	Q26671524
Brewer's House	II	The Street			24 January 1967	TQ8795460382; 51°18′41″N 0°41′43″E		1343877	Upload Photo	Q26627645
Brickwall and Railings to Forecourt	II*	The Street			24 January 1967	TQ8796360251; 51°18′37″N 0°41′44″E		1299305	Upload Photo	Q17546450
Burnham House	II	The Street			27 August 1952	TQ8801160367; 51°18′41″N 0°41′46″E		1069366	Upload Photo	Q26322312
Chantries	II	The Street			27 November 1984	TQ8797660343; 51°18′40″N 0°41′45″E		1299311	Upload Photo	Q26586723
Chantry House	II*	The Street			24 January 1967	TQ8798260406; 51°18′42″N 0°41′45″E		1069369	Upload Photo	Q17546274
Chimneys	II	The Street			27 November 1984	TQ8797460284; 51°18′38″N 0°41′44″E		1069367	Upload Photo	Q26322314
Church of St John the Baptist	I	The Street	church building		24 January 1967	TQ8800760322; 51°18′39″N 0°41′46″E		1343876	Church of St John the Baptist More images	Q17530144
Dovecot 25 Yards North West of Chantry House	II	The Street			27 November 1984	TQ8798260451; 51°18′44″N 0°41′45″E		1299321	Upload Photo	Q26586733
K6 Telephone Kiosk to North West of Parish Church	II	The Street			25 August 1987	TQ8798860337; 51°18′40″N 0°41′45″E		1343895	Upload Photo	Q26627662
Wall Running South of Brickwall	II	The Street			27 November 1984	TQ8795160233; 51°18′37″N 0°41′43″E		1069368	Upload Photo	Q26322316
Wesley Chapel, Wesley Cottage and Holly Cottage	II	Silver Street			27 November 1984	TQ8773160391; 51°18′42″N 0°41′32″E		1069402	Upload Photo	Q26322374

== See also ==
- Grade I listed buildings in Kent
- Grade II* listed buildings in Kent

== Sources ==
- Newman, John (2013) [1969], Kent: North-East and East, The Buildings of England, New Haven and London: Yale University Press, ISBN 978-0-300-18506-5
