= Marius of Britain =

Legendary king of the Britons

Marius was a legendary king of the Britons during the time of the Roman occupation of Britain, as recounted in Geoffrey of Monmouth's pseudohistorical Historia Regum Britanniae. He came to power in 96AD. He was the son of King Arvirargus and ruled following his father's death.

According to Geoffrey, he ruled wisely in the time when the Picts first arrived in Britain. A fleet of ships under the leadership of Sodric came from Scythia and landed in Albany. Once there, they began to destroy the lands and Marius was forced to react. Following numerous battles, Marius killed Rodric and set up a stone there to remember that triumph. In addition, that land became known as Westmorland after him. In respect for the people he defeated, he gave them a small portion of Albany called Caithness to live in. Marius refused, however, to give them women to marry so the Picts fled to Ireland and took wives there.

Marius established close ties with Rome and good diplomacy through tribute and respect of the Roman citizens in Britain. He followed the laws of his ancestors and ruled justly. When he died, he was succeeded by his son, Coilus.

Legendary titles
Preceded by Arvirargus	King of Britain	Succeeded by Coilus
