= Bredgar Hoard =

Roman coin hoard

Coordinates: 51.312°N 0.694°E

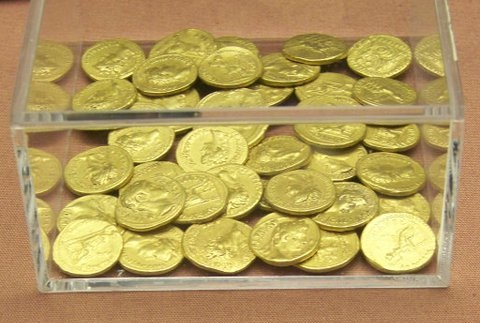
The Bredgar Hoard on display on in the British Museum.

The Bredgar Hoard is a Roman coin hoard found in Bredgar, Kent in 1957. It consisted of 34 gold aurei, the latest of which were from 41 to 42 AD. The coins are in the British Museum.

The hoard was discovered by Bryan Hollands, who was digging foundations for his bungalow in Gore Road, Bredgar. The coins consisted of one Julius Caesar, twelve Augustus, seventeen Tiberius, one Nero Drusus, and three Claudius aurei. The coins were buried in about 43 AD, the year of the Roman invasion of Britain. It may have represented the savings of a Roman officer who was killed in the Battle of the Medway.
