= The Tribe of Witches =

Archaeological study by Stephen J. Yeates

The Tribe of Witches: The Religion of the Dobunni and Hwicce
- The first edition cover of the book, depicting Cleeve Hill in the background, with a relief of Mercury and his consort found in Gloucester in the foreground.
- Author: Stephen J. Yeates
- Language: English
- Subject: English Iron Age archaeology, Anglo-Saxon archaeology
- Publisher: Oxbow Books
- Publication date: 2008
- Publication place: England
- Media type: Print (Paperback)
- Pages: 195
- ISBN: 978-1842173190
- Followed by: A Dreaming for the Witches (2009)

The Tribe of Witches: The Religion of the Dobunni and Hwicce is a historical and archaeological study of pre-Christian religion among the Iron Age Dobunni and the Early Medieval Hwicce, two tribal groups who lived in central England. It was written by the archaeologist Stephen J. Yeates and published by Oxbow Books in 2008. Yeates had previously published his theories in a three-volume British Archaeological Report monograph entitled Religion, Community and Territory: Defining Religion in the Severn Valley and Adjacent Hills from the Iron Age to the Early Medieval Period (2006).

Throughout the book, Yeates explores a number of different archaeological and geographical features located in the region of Dobunni and Hwicce, looking at how the landscape evolved throughout the Iron Age, Romano-British period and Early Middle Ages. These include the temples built in the area, sacred rivers, mines and defensive features.

The Tribe of Witches was reviewed in both peer-reviewed academic journals and by a number of practicing Pagans. The former were predominantly negative, arguing that Yeates' arguments were farfetched, lacking sufficient evidence and that he suffered from a poor grasp of onomastics; in contrast, many also praised his writing style and his extensive use of references and images. Yeates expanded on the theories put forward in The Tribe of Witches in his later book, A Dreaming for the Witches: The Recreation of the Dobunni Primal Myth (2009).

== Background ==
The book was the result of research carried out by Yeates at Oxford University as part of a D.Phil. project from 2001 to 2005. The supervisors of the study were Prof. Martin Henig and Prof. Barry Cunliffe, and the assessors Dr. Ray Howell and Prof. Chris Gosden. Though certain ideas, such as that concerning Cuda, had already been formulated before this period.

Several of Yeates' arguments and theories had seen publication prior to the release of The Tribe of Witches. His theories regarding the goddess Cuda had been published in peer assessed academic journals both locally, and internationally. A review of the 2006 publication Religion, Community, and Territory from a linguist Baker stated that we should now recognise Cuda and that she is the root of place-names using *Cod. Some of the Cotswold river-names have been discussed in an article in the Journal of the English Place-name Society. His arguments for cultural continuity in the region were also published in a peer assessed paper in Lewis and Semple (2010) Perspectives in Landscape Archaeology: Papers presented at Oxford 2003–05.

== Synopsis ==
Chapter one, "The Dobunni, the Hwicce and Religion", offers an introduction to Yeates' argument, noting that his study is multidisciplinary in nature, making use of history, archaeology and onomastics. Offering a brief background to both the Dobunni and the Hwicce, Yeates then briefly discusses the manner in which scholars have previously approached the study of pre-Christian religion in Britain. The second chapter, entitled "The Deity and the Landscape", looks at the various shrines and temples from both the Pre-Roman and Roman Iron Age that have been archaeologically identified within the Dobunni region. Using etymological evidence, he puts forward propositions for the existence of previously unknown prehistoric deities who were localised to the region, namely an Iron Age goddess of the Cotswolds known as Cuda. Yeates attempts to present a picture of the regional landscape, and the manner in which it was viewed as being "spiritual and imbued with the divine" by its inhabitants.

Chapter three, "The Sacred Rivers", explores the deification of rivers in the British Iron Age, and the archaeological evidence for votive offerings within them. Yeates proceeds to look at the multiple rivers within the region being discussed – including the River Severn and River Wye – while making reference to any evidence for ritual activity along them. The fourth chapter, "The Gods of Tribes and Folk Groups", considers the long-term developments of communities in the area, and the connections that might exist between Iron Age and Early Medieval settlements. Proclaiming that Medieval sources record the existence of two local Iron Age gods, Weogonera and Salenses, he uses this as evidence for his belief that there was a cultural continuity from prehistory into the Medieval, and that the Hwicce were therefore the descendants of the Dobunni. Chapter five, "Mining and Minerals", explores evidence for mining in the region, highlighting the connection between this activity and religious belief in prehistoric society. Chapter six deals with aspects of war.

Chapter seven deals with the local hunter god and sacred groves or nemetons. Arguments concerning the hunter god in local "Dobunnic" religion are not new and have their origins in a series of publications by Boon, Henig and Merrifield. Chapter eight looks at tree shrines. Chapter nine the significance of burial in the landscape. Chapter ten considers the sacred horse. Chapter eleven looks at the tribal deities. Chapter twelve the influence of Christianity.

== Review and reception ==
=== Academic reviews ===
"Yeates brings into this discussion a variety of evidence, including material from archaeology, epigraphy, onomastics, imagery, folk tradition, religion, landscape studies and history of the Roman and early medieval periods. His principal foci are religion and landscape, and it is through intensive investigation of these two topics that he addresses the question of continuity from the earlier group to the later. As he explains, the beliefs and practices of the pre-Christian religions of Britain are difficult to ascertain but, in pulling together diverse kinds of evidence, the author attempts to draw connections between religious ideas in the late prehistoric Iron Age, the Roman Period and the early Middle Ages."

— Peter S. Wells, 2009.

Peter S. Wells of the University of Missouri reviewed The Tribe of Witches for the Cambridge Archaeological Journal in 2009. Wells criticised Yeates' use of the word "tribe" to refer to both the Dobunni and the Hwicce, believing that another term might have been more appropriate. He also criticised the use of maps, believing that they were unhelpful, in particular for anyone not familiar with the regional landscape. Considering the text to be "very engaging", he noted that the bibliography was "extensive and valuable", with good use of illustrations. Nonetheless, Wells thought Yeates' primary argument to be unconvincing, highlighting the fact that depictions of females holding vessels were widespread across the Roman world, and not localised to the region of the Dobunni.

Time and Mind: The Journal of Archaeology, Consciousness and Culture published a review authored by the folklorist Jeremy Harte. Taking a largely negative attitude towards The Tribe of Witches, he proclaimed that the work greatly resembled the sort of approach that he would have expected from a 19th-century antiquarian. Although applauding Yeates' extensive use of referencing, he stated that many of Yeates' basic arguments were wrong and that several of Yeates' statements were misleading. Noting that "whole chapters are little more than a repetition of possibilities", he condemned much of the book's argument by remarking that much of Yeates' sacred landscape consists of "nonexistent sites" that were "created by analogy with other sites which are not there either." Ultimately, he accepted that although a "colorful book", The Tribe of Witches resembled "historical romance" more than historical scholarship.

Another largely negative review, this time written by the Celticist Simon Rodway of the University of Aberystwyth, appeared within Britannia: A Journal of Romano-British and Kindred Studies. Admitting that from the back cover he expected The Tribe of Witches to be filled with "wild claims", he was surprised that these claims were "merely hinted at" most of the time; he found it difficult to describe the book as "an ambitious work" due to the fact that while a broad swathe of material is dealt with, most of it is examined only perfunctorily, leaving Rodway with the impression that Yeates "has lost interest in his subject entirely." Stating that Yeates' hypothesis was hidden within a "pseudo-Nennian heap", he chastises the author for failing to provide sufficient evidence to support his claims for an Iron Age/Medieval cultural continuity, and for failing to propose how such a continuity had been maintained; he highlights that Yeates' argument here is similar to Nicholas Higham's "problematic" theory of a largely peaceful language shift from Celtic to Germanic. Although remarking that he was unfit to judge Yeates' use of the archaeological material, he did note that the author's use of historical sources was "adequate at best" while his use of onomastics was "woeful"; remarking that Yeates clearly belonged to "the 'sounds a bit like' school of etymology", he states that Yeates has also failed to understand the arguments of many of the onomasticians whom he is citing and that "[a]ny novice historical linguist" could have told the author that his "tribe of witches" was a "phantom". Furthermore, highlighting that "very few pages are free of basic errors", he describes Yeates' thinking as "muddled" and ultimately considered The Tribe of Witches to be a "shallow, muddled and thoroughly underwhelming book" of no use to the scholarly study of either the Dobunni or Hwicce.

Other peer-reviewed journals to publish reviews included Oxoniensia and Transactions of the Birmingham & Warwickshire Archaeological Society.

In a short review published in British Archaeology, the magazine of the Council for British Archaeology, the landscape archaeologist Della Hooke of the University of Birmingham criticised Yeates' book, labeling it a "bold attempt" but opining that it lacked sufficient evidence for many of its conclusions. Arguing that his arguments were "intriguing but unproven", Hooke felt that it was "unwise" to publish Yeates' conclusions in a "popular concise form" where they would reach a larger non-academic audience. She furthermore attacked his theory that the Hwicce took their name from an Iron Age witch stirring a sacred cauldron, claiming that it "verges upon fantasy."

=== Wider reception ===
Writing on The Druid Grove website, a reviewer going by the pseudonym of Kestrel referred to Yeates' work as "a most interesting book" but expressed reservations about his theories regarding the mother goddess with her tub being symbolic of the valley. Another Contemporary Pagan, D. James, reviewed the book on the Twisted Tree Bookshelf website. James believed that the book should be read by contemporary Pagans, and that it "significantly increases our understanding of the social and religious structures of our ancient forebears and is worthy addition to any bookshelf." Linguist Steven Posch writes that since witchcraft did not become a religion until the 20th century, any attempts to derive it from a tribal religion of more than 1000 years previous are ultimately tendentious, and suggests that Yeates worked backwards from modern Wicca, "doing his damnedest to find a Triple Goddess paired with a God of Hunting—and better it be if he's horned." Posch holds that the book is of importance to modern pagans as mythic, rather than historic, history, and that Yeates' vision of a paganism grounded in the local landscape offers a template for contemporary pagan praxis.
