= Dobunni =

Celtic tribe in Britain

Geography
- Capital: Corinium Dobunnorum (Cirencester)
- Location: West Oxfordshire; Gloucestershire; Monmouthshire; North Somerset; Bristol; South Herefordshire; Warwickshire; Wiltshire; Worcester; Breconshire >South Gloucestershire
- Rulers: Anted[...], Eisu[...], Catti[...], Comux, Inam[...], Corio[...], Boduoc[...]

The Dobunni were one of the Iron Age tribes living in the British Isles prior to the Roman conquest of Britain. There are seven known references to the tribe in Roman histories and inscriptions.

Various historians and archaeologists have examined the Dobunni, including Stephen J. Yeates in his book The Tribe of Witches (2008), where he suggests that the latter part of the name possibly derives from *bune, a cup or vessel, with a similar meaning to the later tribal name Hwicce; both being related to the recognisable cult of a Romano-British goddess. This view has been sharply criticised by several archaeologists. Archaeologist Miles Russell suggests that their original name may have been "Bodunni", connecting this with the Celtic word *bouda meaning "Victorious", in the sense of "The Victorious Ones".

== Territory ==
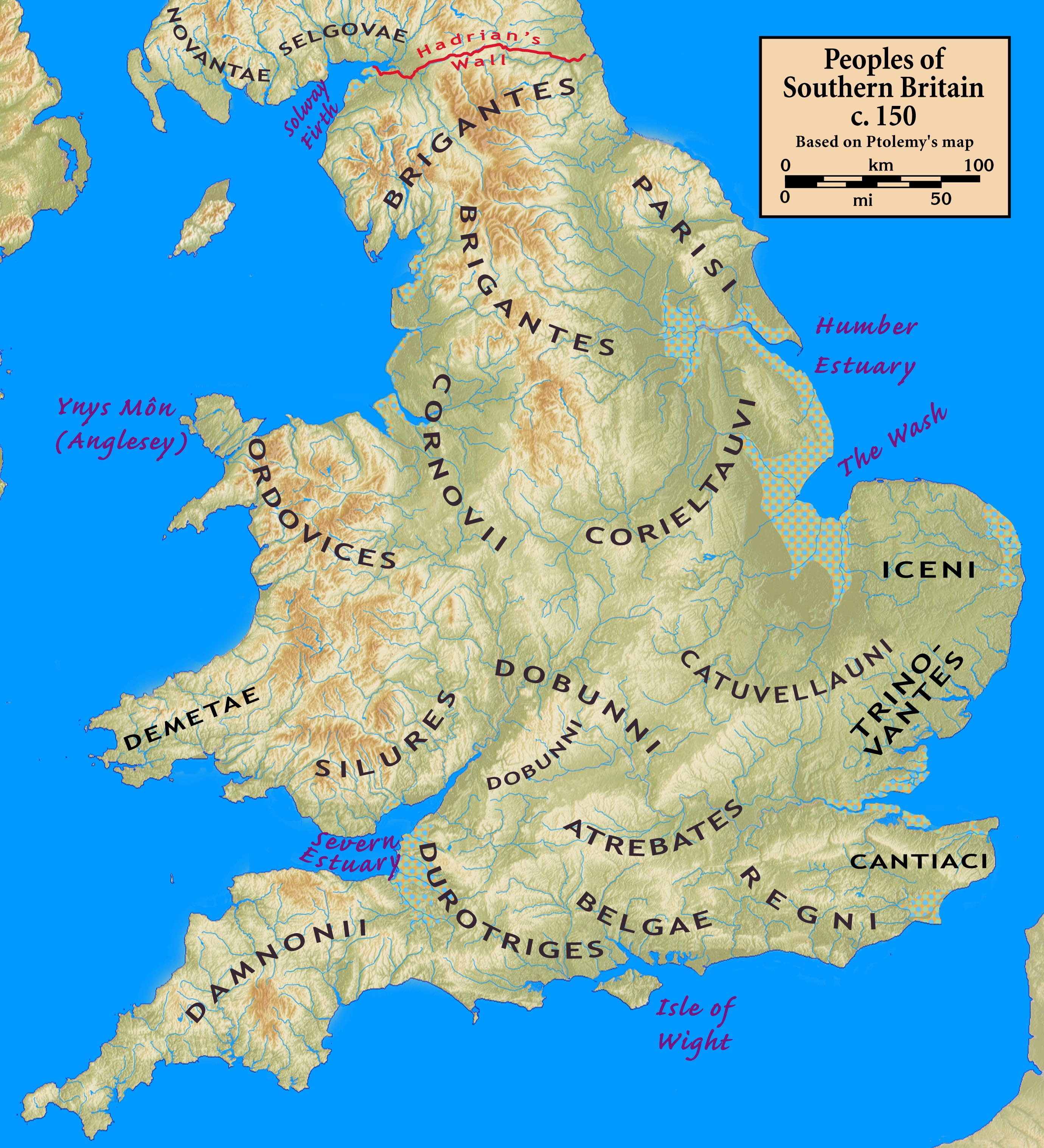
The Celtic tribes of Southern Britain showing the Dobunni and their neighbours.

The tribe lived in central Britain in an area that today broadly coincides with the English counties of Bristol, Gloucestershire and the north of Somerset, although at times their territory may have extended into parts of what are now Herefordshire, Oxfordshire, Wiltshire, Worcestershire, and Warwickshire. Their capital acquired the Roman name of Corinium Dobunnorum, which is today known as Cirencester.

Their territory was bordered by the Cornovii and Corieltauvi to the North; the Catuvellauni to the East; the Atrebates and Belgae to the South; and the Silures and Ordovices to the West. Some of these suggestions are, however, speculative.

There is evidence for a cult associated with the tribe in the Romano-British period; the evidence being coterminous with the tribe's territory. Sculpture has been found at Gloucester, Cirencester, Nettleton, Bath, Wellow, and Aldsworth.

== Iron Age period ==
The Dobunni were a large group of farmers and craftspeople, living in small villages concentrated in fertile valleys. A major study of the Iron Age material was carried out by Tom Moore.

Remnants of several fortified camps, otherwise known as hillforts, thought to have been occupied by the Dobunni can be seen in the Bristol area at Maes Knoll, Clifton Down, Burwalls and Stokeleigh – all overlooking the Avon Gorge – and at Kingsweston Down and Blaise Castle.

In the late Iron Age period, southern Britain saw the development of sites generally referred to as oppida (towns). An example of such a site has been recognised for some time at Bagendon, near Cirencester. It has now been realised that the Bagendon site was not as important as first thought, as other extensive sites are now known to have existed at places such as Salmonsbury.

== Roman period ==
Dio Cassius referred to the tribe as "Bodunni", probably a misspelling of the Dobunni. Tributary to the Catuvellauni, they capitulated to the invading Romans when Caratacus and Togodumnus withdrew.

Unlike the Silures, their neighbours in what later became southeast Wales, they were not a warlike people and submitted to the Romans even before they reached their lands. Afterwards they readily adopted the Romano-British lifestyle.

Even though the Dobunni were incorporated into the Roman Empire in AD 43, their territory was probably not formed into Roman political units until AD 96–98. The tribal territory was divided into a civitas centred on Cirencester, and the Colonia at Gloucester. The Colonia was established during the reign of the emperor Nerva (AD 96–98).

At the beginning of the 4th century, Britain was reorganised into, initially, four and then five provinces. The Dobunnic territory lay in the province of Britannia Prima, as described in an inscription found at the base of a Jupiter column. The area remained a Roman civitas until approximately 409.

The Dobunnic territory contained two large towns (Corinium Dobunnorum now Cirencester, and Colonia Nerviana Glevum now Gloucester). Besides this there were numerous smaller towns, and many rich villas.

Stephen Yeates asserts that a study of the religion of the Dobunni has shown that there was a focus on the worship of the natural world. It is possible to identify deities associated with the landscape, for example *Cuda, a mother goddess associated with the Cotswold Hills and its rivers and springs, and Sulis Minerva at Bath. Other cults were defined by social action, such as mining, for example at Lydney Park, and hunting, for example at Pagan's Hill near Chew Stoke.

== Sub-Roman period ==
After the collapse of the Roman provincial government, the core of this area retained its territorial identity until the Battle of Deorham in 577 (regarded by some as a dubious event), when the Saxons made advances as far as the River Severn. These gains were reversed 50 years later when Penda of Mercia fought the West Saxons at the Battle of Cirencester, and the area came under the influence of Mercia as the sub-kingdom of the Hwicce. It has been suggested that the area retained a distinct identity as a Christian sub-kingdom, instead of being simply absorbed into pagan Mercia, as a reward for an alliance against the West Saxons; and that this is evidence of a cultural continuity between the civitas of the Dobunni and the kingdom of Hwicce.

== Coinage ==
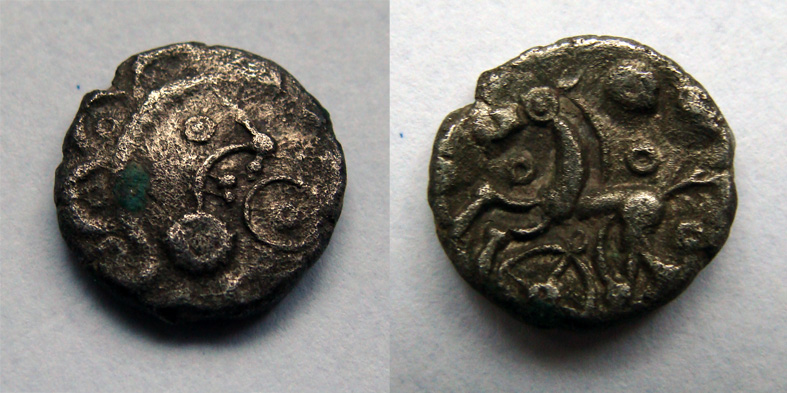
Silver coin of the Dobunni tribe.

The Dobunni were one of the tribes believed to have issued coins before Roman arrival and the introduction and adoption of Roman currency. Numismatic evidence suggests that the Dobunni kings subdivided their land between a north and south zone, sometimes becoming unified under a single ruler.

A repeated theme of coins ascribed to the Dobunni is a branched emblem appearing on the obverse. The symbol's significance and origins are unclear although corn, ferns and a derivative of the wreath on the British Q stater have all been suggested.

== See also ==
List of Celtic tribes
