= Togodumnus =

1st-century king of the British Catuvellauni

Togodumnus (maybe died AD 43) was king of the British Catuvellauni tribe, whose capital was at St Albans, at the time of the Roman conquest. He can probably be identified with the legendary British king Guiderius. He is usually thought to have led the fight against the Romans alongside his brother but to have been killed early in the campaign. However some authorities now argue that he sided with the Romans and is one and the same person as the client-king Tiberius Claudius Cogidubnus, whose original name may have been Togidubnus or Togodumnus.

== Career ==
Togodumnus is known only from Cassius Dio's Roman History, according to which he was a son of Cunobelinus. He probably succeeded his father to the kingship of the Catuvellauni, who were the dominant kingdom in the south-east of Britain at this time. Their territory took in the lands of several other nations, including their neighbours the Trinovantes and possibly the Dobunni further west.

He had two notable brothers, Adminius and Caratacus. In Cunobelinus's later days Adminius gained control of the Cantiaci in Kent but was driven from Britain in 40 AD, seeking refuge with the Roman emperor Caligula. Caligula planned an invasion of Britain in response but called it off at the last minute.

Based on coin distribution it appears that Caratacus, following in the footsteps of his uncle Epaticcus, completed the conquest of the Atrebates, the main rival to the Catuvellauni, in the early 40s. The Atrebatian king, Verica, fled to Rome and gave the new emperor, Claudius, a pretext to conquer Britain in 43.

== Death ==
According to Dio's account, Togodumnus led the initial resistance to the invasion alongside Caratacus but was killed after the battle on the Thames. The Roman commander, Aulus Plautius, then dug in at the Thames and sent word for Claudius to join him for the final march on the Catuvellaunian capital, Camulodunum (Colchester). Dio says that this was because the resistance became fiercer as the Britons tried to avenge Togodumnus, and Plautius needed the emperor's help to complete the conquest; however, as Claudius was no military man and in the end spent only sixteen days in Britain, it is likely the Britons were already as good as beaten. Leadership passed to Caratacus, who took the fight outside Roman-controlled territory and remained at large until 51.

== Togodumnus and Togidubnus ==
Tacitus mentions a king who ruled several territories as a loyal ally of Rome into the later part of the first century, called Cogidumnus in most manuscripts but Togidumnus in one. A damaged inscription, naming him "..gidubnus", places him in Chichester. The similarity of name has led some, including Barry Cunliffe of Oxford University, to suggest that they may be one and the same. John Hind argues that Dio was mistaken to write that Togodumnus died after the battle on the Thames: that the Greek word φθαρεντὸς, "perished", may be Dio's mistranslation of a more ambiguous Latin word, amisso, "lost", in one of his hypothetical sources, that in fact Togodumnus was defeated rather than killed, and that the Britons wanted to avenge his defeat rather than his death. He goes on to propose that Togodumnus, having submitted to the Romans, was appointed by them as a friendly king over the territories of the Regini, the Atrebates, the Belgae and the Dobunni, becoming the loyal king referred to by Tacitus.

Regnal titles
Preceded by Cunobelinus	King of the Catuvellauni	Succeeded by Caratacus
