= Coilus =

Legendary king of the Britons

Coilus was a legendary king of the Britons during the time of the Roman occupation of Britain as recounted in Geoffrey of Monmouth's pseudohistorical Historia Regum Britanniae. He came to power in 142AD.

He was the son of King Marius and ruled following his father's death.

According to Geoffrey, Coilus was brought up in Rome and favoured the company of Romans in Britain. Throughout his reign, he paid Rome its tribute without question. In Britain, he allowed the nobles peace and granted them large gifts. He was succeeded by his only son, Lucius.

Legendary titles
Preceded by Marius	King of Britain	Succeeded by Lucius
