= Archaeology Today =

- Monty Python's Flying Circus episode
- Episode no.: Series 2 Episode 8
- Original air date: 7 November 1970
- Running time: 25–30 minutes

"Archaeology Today", recorded on 9 October 1970 and broadcast on 17 November 1970, was the 21st episode of the popular British television comedy Monty Python's Flying Circus which was created by the Monty Python group. As stated on the Monty Python's Flying Circus Wiki, "The show often targets the idiosyncrasies of British life, especially that of professionals, and is at times politically charged"; this episode in particular seems to target the professional world of anthropology and archaeology.

== Trailer ==
The trailer includes the theme song and an introduction to this episode of Monty Python's Flying Circus. It has an animated introduction where there is a large foot that becomes broken and disintegrates into the ground, with no evidence left. Nature continues its natural action and the surroundings grow and eventually has a city built on top of the site. The city becomes condemned and is then bulldozed down with plans for new luxury apartments. While constructing the new, luxury apartments, an "artifact" is found which resembles a very large big toe, and is brought to the British Museum, where it is called the "archaeological find of the century!" They were able to "accurately reconstruct" the artifact, using the toe as a trunk for an elephant.

== "Archaeology Today" ==
A television interviewer (Michael Palin) introduces two archaeologists: Professor Lucien Kastner (Terry Jones), of Oslo University, and Sir Robert Eversley (John Cleese). It soon becomes obvious that the host is interested mainly in their heights; he insults Kastner (5′10″) and fawns over Sir Robert (6′5″). When Sir Robert brings up his discovery of Polynesian influences, the host asks about the Polynesians' stature; Sir Robert replies that it "has nothing to do with archaeology," whereupon the host takes an artifact and smashes it, enraging Kastner. Sir Robert punches the host, who swears revenge.

We then see Sir Robert with his assistant Danielle (Carol Cleveland) digging in Egypt 1920. Sir Robert had been finding great artifacts and was very happy which caused him to break out in song. He finds a Sumerian drinking vessel, an unprecedented find in the context of the Fourth Dynasty of Egypt. The interviewer then appears and challenges Sir Robert. Kastner leaps onto the interviewer's shoulders, making them together almost twice as tall as Sir Robert. Danielle then leaps onto Sir Robert's shoulders, and each stack is further heightened by an Arab servant. The six of them brawl, smashing the found artifacts and killing each other. With his dying breath, the interviewer addresses a typical signoff to the camera.

== "Silly Vicar" ==
Rev. Arthur Belling (Graham Chapman), of St Looney Up the Cream Bun and Jam, appeals for help in curing our less fortunate neighbours of their sanity.

== "Leapy Lee" ==
A smartly-dressed woman (Eric Idle) appears, to make an appeal on behalf of the "National Truss", but is derailed by her inability to remember her own name.

== "Registrar (wife swap)" ==
Mr Cook and a woman enter a wedding registrar's office, and Mr Cook (Eric Idle) explains to the registrar that he is dissatisfied with the blonde he married last week and wants to exchange her for this woman (Barbara Lindley). The registrar (Terry Jones) tries to explain that it can't be done, and Mr Cook tries to haggle, remarking that "I only wanted a bloody good—" He is interrupted by a whistle; a referee (John Cleese) enters and takes down Cook's personal information. When he has finished, he blows his whistle again and the next sketch begins:

A doctor (Michael Palin) calls for the next patient (Graham Chapman), who tries to clarify that he is not Mr Watson but Dr Watson. The first doctor persistently misunderstands. A whistle blows and a caption appears: That sketch has been abandoned.

=== Archaeological perspective ===
This skit illuminates a field of study within the archaeological/anthropological realm of marriage. This skit brings up the question of what is the "proper" form of marriage. Many cultures around the world have different definitions of a marriage and who may be married. Some other types of marriage practices include: monogamy, polygamy, polyandry.

The name "Watson" comes up often in this skit which could be a reference to Dr. Watson of the Sherlock Holmes series. This highlights a stereotype of archaeologists as detectives.

== "Mr. and Mrs. Git" ==
The host of a party (Graham Chapman) introduces John Stokes (Michael Palin) to his neighbour A Sniveling Little Rat-Faced Git (Terry Jones) and then leaves them to an awkward conversation. John has some trouble absorbing the knowledge that this string of insults is the man's name; meeting A Sniveling Little Rat-Faced's wife, Dreary Fat Boring Old Git (John Cleese), doesn't help. John's wife Norah Jane approaches and he reluctantly introduces them by their full names. Mr and Mrs Git chat about how their children, Dirty Lying Little Two-Faced and Ghastly Spotty Horrible Vicious Little, are constantly teased for their unfortunate surname; and about other matters as disgusting as their names. Mr and Mrs Stokes try to escape the conversation.

The sketch is then restarted in a "nice version": as before, the host introduces John to his neighbour and turns away, but this time the neighbor's name is Mr Watson. A nun (Carol Cleveland) tells the audience that she "preferred the dirty version". She is then punched by a boxer (Terry Gilliam).

=== Archaeological perspective ===
This skit highlights an anthropological concern of the "Culture Clash" of modern globalization. The mixing of people with different cultural backgrounds can cause situations where someone's name and daily life practices can make others in a social situation feel uncomfortable. The mixing of cultures makes life more interesting but more complicated. The reference to the nun liking the "dirty version" also could be viewed as her saying that she preferred the real version not the censored one, preferring a "real life" situation than one created for public consumption.

== "Roy and Hank Spim – Mosquito hunters" ==
This episode begins with brothers Hank (Graham Chapman) and Roy (Eric Idle) walking through what seems to be fairly rough country terrain. As Hank pulls a bazooka out of the back of a trailer, the narrator (John Cleese) explains how the fearless backwoodsmen brothers have chosen a life of violence in a world where only the fittest survive. It is the brothers thirst of adventure that lead them off mosquito hunting. When they are asked why they don't simply use fly spray, Roy answers "well, where's the sport in that?".

Suddenly, Hank spots the first mosquito of the day. Viewers are left tense as they watch both brothers crawl through the bushes to ambush the mosquito. As Roy fires off a bazooka, Hank quickly follows by shooting off a machine gun. As the smoke from their shots begins to dissipate, the brothers, with delight, notice that they have successfully killed the mosquito. However, just as a measure of precaution, Roy approaches the body and fires off a few more rounds from his machine gun. Hank then proceeds by pulling out an enormous curved knife and skins the mosquito. It is said that the wings of a fully grown mosquito can be sold for anything up to point eight of a penny of the open market. After a long and hard day of hunting the two brothers return to their camp for a restful night. Before they can rest, the two brothers, surrounded by their trophies, discuss a much greater adventure: they are planning a moth hunt.

In preparing for the moth hunt, Hank describes how he will use a helicopter to lure the moth away from the flowers. This will present Roy with the perfect opportunity to come along in his Lockheed Starfighter and attack the moth with air-to-air missiles.

=== Archaeological perspective ===
This article can be related to the field and study of archaeology in many ways. As will be explained, it relates to the field in relation to the appeal of adventure and the fashion. As noted in Timothy Clack and Marcus Brittain's book Archaeology and the Media, in the clip one can see that both Roy and Hank match the description. Both brothers are seen throughout the clip dressed in typical colonial wear. The action of hunting the mosquitoes is also greatly dramatized to give it more of an archaeo-appeal. The hunt is also very glamorized and portrayed as being very dangerous. To simply kill a mosquito, both brothers use weapons of mass destruction instead of simple fly spray. The various ways in which archaeology as a field is glamorized are also noted and further explained in Cornelius Holtorf's book From Stonehenge to Las Vegas and in Archaeology as a Brand!. Glamorizing a field like archaeology can be used as a method of attracting more people and gaining their interest.

== "Poofy Judges" ==
Two judges (Eric Idle and Michael Palin), taking off their robes in a dressing room, chat in a campy manner. One reports that he did his summing-up "in a butch voice", and the jury loved it. They reminisce about flirtations in court.

== "Mrs. Thing and Mrs. Entity" ==
Two middle-aged women (Eric Idle and Graham Chapman) meet on a park bench and commiserate: both are exhausted from trivial exertions (making tea, shopping for nothing). They comfort themselves with the thought that women in the past had worse morning chores: Mrs Stanley Baldwin had to catch partridges with her bare hands, Mrs William Pitt the Elder had to dig for truffles with her nose, and Mrs Beethoven had to spur on her husband's mynah bird.

== "Beethoven's Mynah Bird (Shakespeare, Michelangelo, & Colin 'Chopper' Mozart (ratcatcher))" ==
Ludwig van Beethoven (John Cleese) sits at his piano. A rude mynah bird perches nearby, not making any noise; Beethoven shouts, "You don't fool me, you stupid mynah bird, I'm not deaf yet!" After the bird cackles at him, Beethoven shoots it and it falls off its perch. He is clearly agitated with difficulty composing his Fifth Symphony. He only becomes more agitated as his wife (Graham Chapman) runs a vacuum cleaner and pesters him about a missing sugar bowl and other mundane matters. The scene then cuts to Shakespeare (Eric Idle), Michelangelo (Terry Jones), and Mozart (Michael Palin), all discussing the names of their current projects comically while discussing their issues with their home life. Mozart's rat-catcher son, Colin "Chopper" Mozart, then goes to shoot some rats in Beethoven's apartment with a machine gun.

Mrs Thing and Mrs Entity remark that Beethoven was glad when he went deaf, because there would be less distractions while he composed music. Beethoven and the mynah reappear, with the mynah bird miming "The Guy Who Found the Lost Chord" by Jimmy Durante.

The episode closes with a return to the Judges, still chatting about various random topics.
