= Guiderius =

Legendary British king according to Geoffrey of Monmouth's Historia Regum Britanniae

Guiderius (Welsh Gwydr or Gwydyr) is a legendary British king according to Geoffrey of Monmouth's Historia Regum Britanniae (History of the Kings of Britain) and related texts. He can probably be identified as deriving from the historical Togodumnus.

The eldest son of Cunobeline, he succeeds his father to the kingship of Britain. Cymbeline had voluntarily paid tribute to Rome, but Guiderius refused to pay it. The emperor Claudius responded by invading. Claudius and his chief of staff, Lelius Hamo, landed at Portchester, entrenching themselves there while besieging the city. Guiderius conscripted all the men of Britain against Claudius and marched south to meet him in battle. The Britons clashed with the Romans and succeeded so well that the Roman army began retreating to their ships.

Hamo, though, put on British armour and began attacking his own army, urging the Britons to do likewise. Because of this, Hamo was able to get close enough to Guiderius to strike him. Guiderius died then or soon after and was succeeded by his brother Arvirargus, who took over as king during the battle.

Guiderius is a character in William Shakespeare's play Cymbeline. He and his brother Arvirargus had been kidnapped in childhood by Belarius, a nobleman wrongly banished by Cymbeline, and brought up in secret in Wales, but are reunited with their father and sister Imogen in time for the Roman invasion.

Legendary titles
Preceded by Cunobeline	King of Britain	Succeeded by Arvirargus
