= Epaticcus =

Early 1st century AD king of the British Catuvellauni

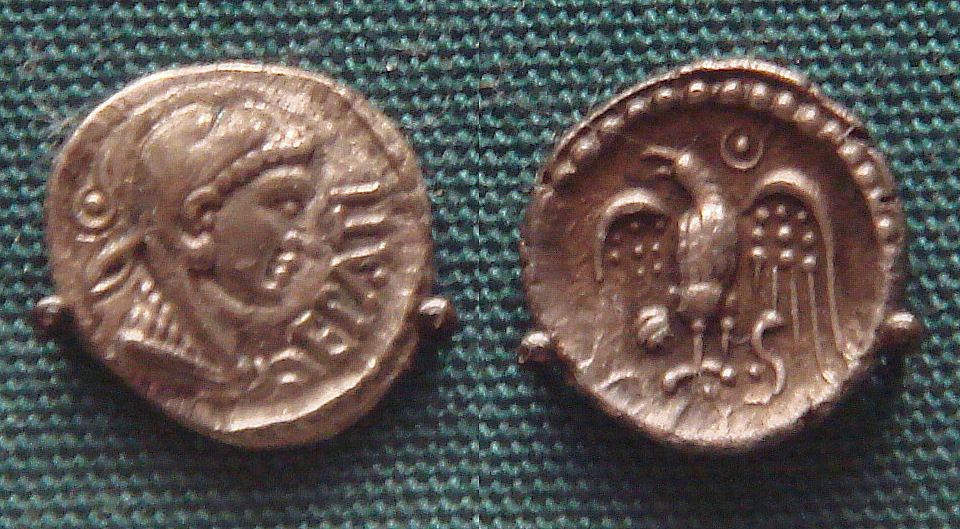
Coin of Epaticcus, Southern England, 20 BCE, with Roman stylistic influence

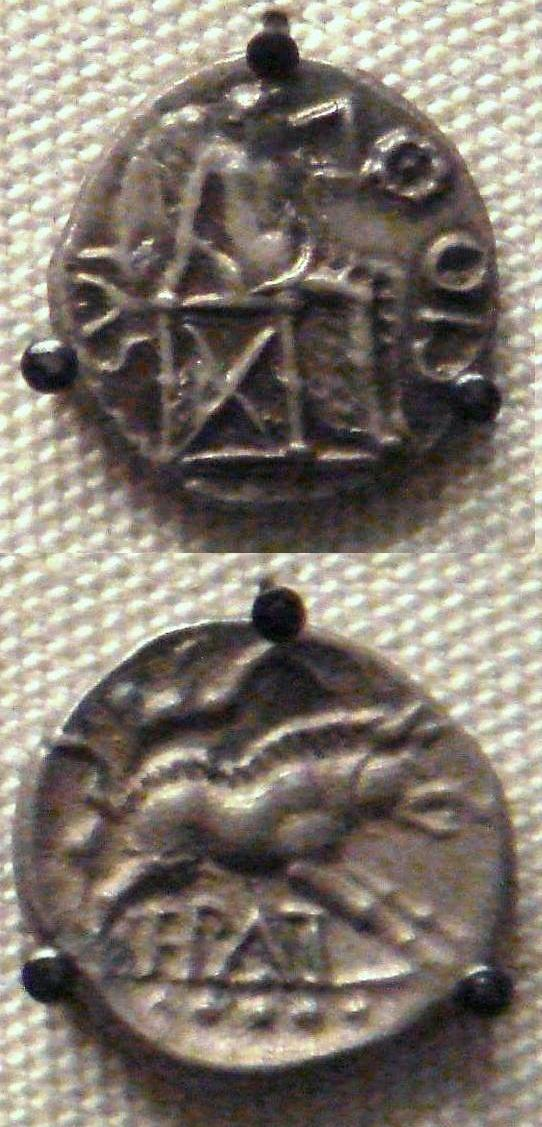
Coins of Epaticcus

Epaticcus or Epaticcu (d. c. AD 35) was a brother of Cunobelinus, king of the Catuvellauni, a tribe of Iron Age Britain.

Coins bearing his name begin to appear in the northern lands of the neighbouring Atrebates tribe and their capital, Calleva Atrebatum (Silchester), probably fell to him around AD 25. It is likely that Epaticcus was permitted to govern the area by his brother as part of the Catuvellaunian hegemony that was expanding across south eastern Britain at the time.
