= Oldest town in Britain =

Oldest continuous settlement in Great Britain

The title of oldest town in Britain is claimed by a number of settlements in Great Britain.

== Abingdon ==
Abingdon in the English county of Oxfordshire (historically Berkshire) claims to be the oldest town in Britain in continuous settlement. Palaeolithic, Mesolithic, Neolithic and Bronze Age remains have been found in and around the town, and evidence of a late-Iron Age enclosure of 33 hectares known as an 'oppidum' was discovered underneath the town centre in 1991. It continued to be used as a town throughout the Roman occupation of Britain and subsequently became a Saxon settlement, named Sevekesham (or Seovechesham) at a time when most other Roman cities were being abandoned. Abingdon Abbey which gave the town its present name was founded in the seventh century.

== Amesbury ==
Amesbury along with Stonehenge in Wiltshire is claimed to be Britain's oldest settlement, dating back to 8820 BC according to a project led by the University of Buckingham. The place is said to have been a transport point with the River Avon acting as a transit route. Evidence of frogs' legs being eaten as well as 31,000 flints and animal bones have also been found.

== Colchester ==
Colchester claims to be Britain's oldest recorded town. However as of 2019 (possibly pre-empting its grant of city status in 2022) it has begun claiming the title of "Britain's First City". Its claim is based on a reference by Pliny the Elder, the Roman writer, in his Natural History (Historia Naturalis) in 77 AD. He described Anglesey as "about 200 miles (322 km) from Camulodunum, a town in Britain", where Camulodunum was the Roman name for Colchester. It is claimed that this is the first known reference to any named settlement in Britain, although coins minted by Tasciovanus mention the Celtic name of the settlement, Camulodunon, as early as 20-10 BC.

Archaeological evidence near Colchester has been dated to the Palaeolithic, with flint tools including at least six Acheulian handaxes having been discovered, from the Mesolithic, the Neolithic and Bronze Ages. In the 1980s, an inventory showed that over 800 pieces of Neolithic and Bronze Age pottery have been found within the town, as well as many examples of worked flint. However the origins of the town lie in the Celtic tribal capital of Camulodunon, which was in existence from at least the first century BC under Addedomarus. Later, under the Celtic warlords Cunobelin and Caratacus in the first century AD, it became the most powerful Celtic kingdom in Britain. In 43 AD, the settlement was conquered by the Roman Empire under Emperor Claudius, who led the attack in person, building a legionary fortress on the site, the first in Britain. This was converted into the town of Colonia Victricensis in 49 AD, becoming the provincial capital and the only pre-Boudican town to have the honour of Roman citizenship. Its town walls, constructed between 61 AD and 80 AD, are the oldest Roman town walls in Britain by at least 150 years. The town was home to a large classical temple, two theatres (including Britain's largest), several Romano-British temples, Britain's only known chariot circus, Britain's first town walls, several large cemeteries and over 50 known mosaics and was home to around 30,000 people. The town is mentioned by name several times by Roman authors, including in Ptolemy's Geography, Tacitus's Annales, The Antonine Itinerary and the Ravenna Cosmography, as well as on monuments such as the tomb inscription for Gnaeus Munatius Aurelius Bassus in Rome, which mentions his time in the town as a census-officer for the Roman population. There is much evidence of activity in Colchester until the early fifth century AD, after which it becomes more scarce. Although there are scattered settlement sites, burials and artefacts in Colchester from between the fifth and ninth centuries AD there is a debate over whether it could be called a “town” in this period (see Camulodunum § Sub-Roman Period). Aside from a ninth-century reference by Nennius to a Caer Colun, the first time Colchester is explicitly mentioned in written accounts is an entry for 917 AD in the Anglo-Saxon Chronicle, when it is recorded that King Edward the Elder led a Saxon army from Surrey, Kent and Essex to recapture the town from a Danish army that had been encamped there since the mid to late ninth century.

== Ipswich ==
The claim of Ipswich, the county town of the English county of Suffolk, is to be the 'oldest English town', and is made in a quite specific sense. Within the Borough boundaries of modern Ipswich, and in its vicinity, there is plentiful evidence of Lower Palaeolithic and Upper Palaeolithic, Neolithic, other prehistoric, Roman and Migration Age occupation. But the claim of Ipswich is grounded upon the fact that it never was an Iron Age or Romano-British town, but at its core was and is the oldest still continuing town to have been established and developed by the English. It has an unbroken history of community as a town since early Anglo-Saxon times.

In this claim,

- by 'oldest' is meant 'first originated or established', and also 'still continuing and existing on that site':
- by 'English' is meant 'established (as a town) and occupied by peoples collectively identified by their use of the Old English language' (subsuming the various migrant and native peoples who coalesced in the area now called England during the 5th to 7th centuries):
- by 'town' is meant, originating as a densely-occupied non-rural community comprising a full range of specialized trades and occupations, with its own industrial and domestic components, serviced by a market-place and forming a centre for mercantile activity, provisioned externally from its hinterland, and so necessarily having had some form of local governance or official organization: a town-like component related economically and politically to a wider region of agrarian occupation under a single power or collective identity.

During the Migration age Germanic customs, the roots of the English language and the distinctive industrial arts and construction techniques of the northern continent were transplanted into eastern Britain. Industrial activity ceased to follow Roman models of organized provincial distribution, but (in the absence of a money currency) reflected more localized needs, or else communications between grand households and patrons. The emergence of regional powers and kingdoms was accompanied by the growth of Emporia, or regional trading-centres for the production, import and export of goods, with attendant service communities. Ipswich (Gipeswic, Yepiswyche, etc.) (in the historic Kingdom of East Anglia) is thought to have been comparable to early Hamwic, a forerunner of modern Southampton (in the historic Kingdom of Wessex), emerging as a primary community serving the kingdom's trade activity towards the Rhine (comparably to Dorestad) through the 7th and 8th centuries, as Hamwih served the north French sea routes to Quentovic.

Modern Southampton however did not develop with the site of Hamwih as its centre. In Ipswich it has been shown that ancient routes linked the 7th century quayside, river-crossing and early market and pottery-making areas, which grew rapidly, enclosing a burial-ground in their midst. In the 8th century a planned grid of streets grew up over the cemetery site between the older roads, uniting the expanding districts. Dense Middle-Saxon structures fronted directly onto the made-up streets. The Viking Age ramparts erected around 900 A.D. enclosed some 52 hectares of settlement but fell well within the area already developed. In the same period a new more spacious reconstruction occurred upon the same grid, with cellared houses and surrounding yards. These streets remain the principal streets and lanes of modern Ipswich, and it is not thought that the community has ever been abandoned or deserted.

The 'city' denomination of both London and York rests partly upon the importance of their Roman antecedents, and as two of the principal seats of Christian bishops in late Roman Britain. Gildas stated that trade was busy in London in his time (540s), and in the 7th century it was focused at the Anglo-Saxon centre of Aldwych. But neither these, nor anything that has been shown from the ruins of the abandoned Roman Colonia of Colchester, can be taken to represent the formation of a new township along distinctively early English principles. Ipswich makes that claim. Ipswich is also the birthplace of the Jeshua Joshua King of the East Anglians, who reigned between 450-498 Although this is disputed due to the lack of evidence to support this.

== Thatcham ==
Thatcham in Berkshire is often said to be the oldest continuously inhabited settlement in Britain, since its occupation can be traced back to a Mesolithic hunting camp, which was discovered there beside a Post-glacial rebound period lake, and there is evidence of human occupation within and around Thatcham covering the past 13,000 years or more.

There is strong evidence to support the case that people settled in Thatcham in the Mesolithic Age (10,000 BC – 4,000 BC). Thatcham has strong evidence that it was settled by the Romans, then Saxons, and was mentioned in the Domesday Book. Subsequently, it received medieval charters.

Thatcham has a place in the 1990 Guinness World Records as being the strongest claimant to the longest continually inhabited settlement in the UK. It is mentioned in the 1993 Guinness World Records book as an example of a place with early prehistoric occupation with a comment on the difficulty of showing continuous habitation.
