= Balkerne Gate =

1st-century Roman gateway in Colchester, England

Coordinates: 51.88966°N 0.89371°E

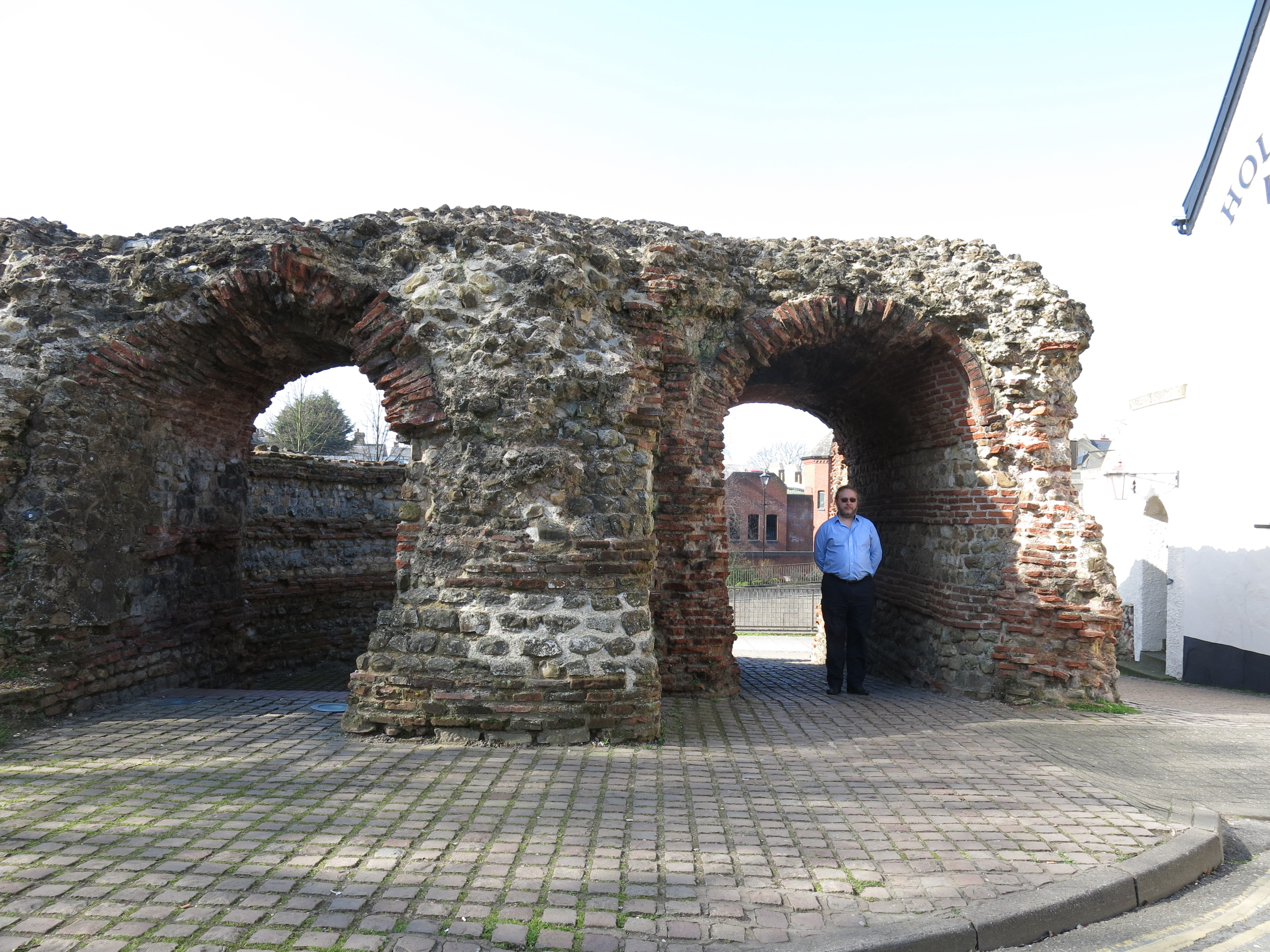
The Balkerne Gate, Colchester, with man in for scale

Balkerne Gate is a Roman gateway in Colchester (the former Camulodunum). It is the largest surviving gateway in Roman Britain and was built where the Roman road from Londinium intersected the town wall of Camulodunum. It is a scheduled monument and a Grade I listed building.

== History ==
According to Historic England, the gate probably dates to the 2nd century AD. It appears to have incorporated an existing monumental arch from the 1st century.

Sir Mortimer Wheeler excavated at the site in 1917. According to a paper he published subsequently:

The gate consisted of two broad carriageways, each 17 ft (5.2 m) wide, flanked by two footways, each about 6 ft (1.8 m) wide. The whole gate projects 30 ft (9.1 m) in front of the town wall, and the total extent of the frontage is 107 ft (33 m).

Although it is the best-preserved Roman gateway in the country, it only survives in part. The remaining gateway is the south-side arched footway; however, the remains of a guard tower are also visible. The rest of the gateway has been overbuilt by the 18th-century Hole in the Wall public house, which is also a listed building.

== Structure ==
Roman town gates sometimes had as many as three entrances but were usually limited to one or two. The Balkerne Gate, however, had four gates, and unusually wide carriageways. It was likely constructed as a monument, rather than as a fortified gateway.

There are no other quadruple gates in Britain but there are a few elsewhere in Europe; for example, the Porte d'Auguste at Nîmes, the Porte Ste. André and the Porte d'Arroux at Autun, and the Porta Palatina at Turin.
