= Funerary stela of Longinus Sdapeze =

1st-century Roman soilder

The funerary stela of Longinus Sdapeze, a Roman military tombstone, was discovered in 1928 in Colchester. He was the son of Matucus, who was born around AD 10 in Serdica, and was part of the Roman army that invaded Roman Britain in AD 43. He was among the First Cavalry Regiment of Thracians, and served possibly as second in command. He died around AD 55, and likely somewhere near Colchester. His tombstone is one of the oldest Roman tombstones ever found in Britain and is one of the best examples of Roman military funeary art from the period.

== Discovery and excavation ==
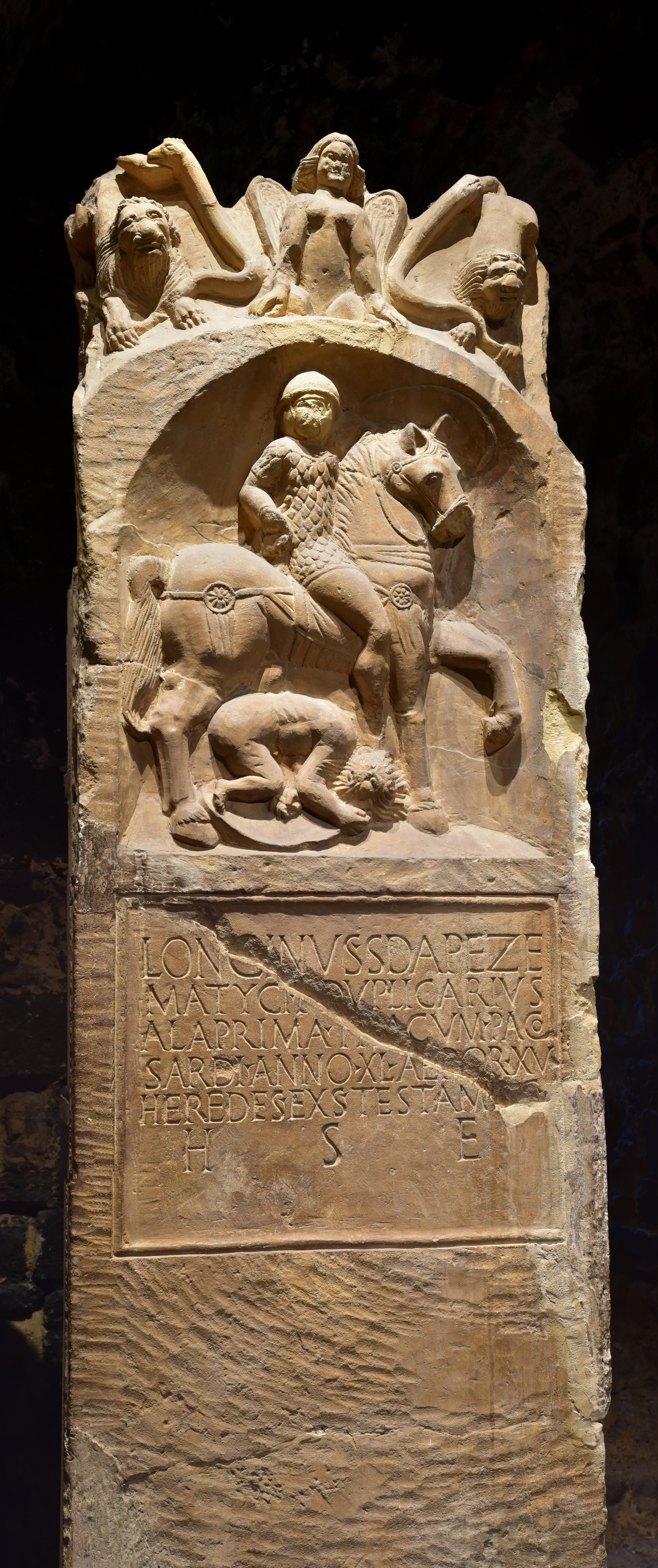
Funerary stela of Longinus Sdapeze

The stela was first discovered by workmen in 1928 during a site levelling project in Colchester on Lexden road. The stela was 3 feet below the topsoil, and laid facedown in pieces. Rex Hull, the newly appointed museum curator, visited the site after 5 days and sketched the piece, showing it was sat south west of the working site. No further investigations were done until much later.

From 1996 to 1998, the area would be re-excavated by an amateur archeologist who removed a layer of concrete. Many of the stela fragments were found scattered around the stone, rather than beneath it, possibly suggesting an attempt to break it up. Though observations do not discount the idea that it could have been cut down at that time of the Boudiccan Rebellion, the current evidence does not support the idea it was vandalised. Another theory put forth, is that the workmen of 1928 mishandled the item which resulted in damage, because they may not have recognised the significance of the item.

Later, fragments from the stela were examined by Kevin Hayward as part of his PhD into Roman Military Architecture. From his study, the material was discovered to be oolitic limestone, estimated to be from the Lincolnshire area. The tombstone is in the Colchester Castle Museum.

== Description and inscription ==
The dimensions of the stela are roughly 0.762 × 2.388 × 0.279 m. The gravestone portrays a cavalry soldier riding an armoured horse. The soldier wears a rounded Galea helmet. He is adorned with leather or chainmail armour. Beneath him is a cowering, naked figure, who looks up at the man. It is thought this may be a native Briton. Above the niche is a sphinx, sitting on their knees. On either side of the sphinx is a lion, who holds a long snake in its paws. The lions are crouched, as if in a hunting position.

The inscription is written as:

LONGINVS.SDAPEZE MATYCI.F.DVPLICARIVS. ALA.PRIMA.TRACVM.PAGO SARDICA.ANNO.XL.AEROR.XV HEREDES.EXS.TESTAM.F.C.H S E

Translated into modern English it reads as:

"Longinus Sdapeze son of Matucus/Mataycus; duplicarius from the First Cavalry Regiment of Thracians, from the district of Sardica, aged 40, of 15 years’ service, lies buried here; his heirs under his will had this set up".

== See also ==
- Caerleon pipe burial, second-century Roman grave in Wales
- Tombstone of Claudia Crysis, first-century Romano-British tombstone found at Lindum
- Roman sites in Great Britain
