= St Helena School, Colchester =

Academy in Essex, England

St Helena School
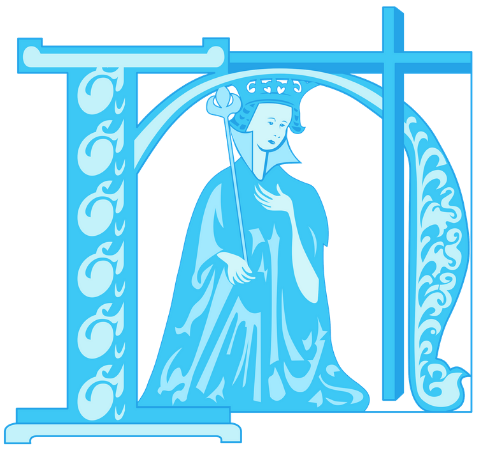

Location
- Sheepen Road; Colchester, Essex, CO3 3LE; England; 51°53′43″N 0°53′19″E

Information
- Type: Academy
- Motto: Aspire, Believe, Achieve
- Established: 1938
- Department for Education URN: 137944 Tables
- Ofsted: Reports
- Head teacher: Serena Kay
- Gender: Coeducational
- Age: 11 to 16
- Enrolment: 1002
- Houses: Abbey; Castle; Priory; Temple
- Colour: Blue
- Website: st-helena.essex.sch.uk

St Helena School is a coeducational secondary school with academy status, located in Colchester, Essex, England. The school is on Sheepen Road opposite Colchester Institute. Its headteacher is Fiona Pierson.

== Notable former pupils ==
- Dominic King, racewalker who competed in the 2012 Summer Olympics
- Jamie Moul, professional golfer
- Sir Bob Russell, long-serving Colchester MP and High Steward
