= Britannia Prima =

Roman province

Britannia Prima Provincia de Britannia Prima (Latin)
- Roman province of Roman Empire (c. AD 296 - 395); Western Roman Empire (c. AD 395 - 410)
- c. AD 296 – AD 410
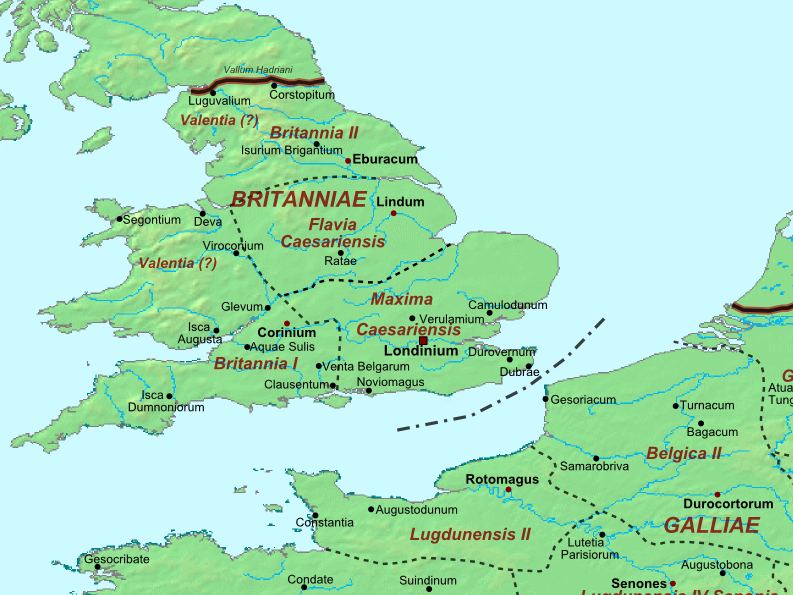
- Another possible arrangement of the late Roman provinces, with Prima in Wales and Cornwall
- Capital: Corinium Dobunnorum (modern-day Cirencester)
- Historical era: Late antiquity
  - Establishment: c. AD 296
  - Dissolution: c. AD 410
Preceded by	Succeeded by
Britannia Superior	Sub-Roman Britain
- Today part of: United Kingdom

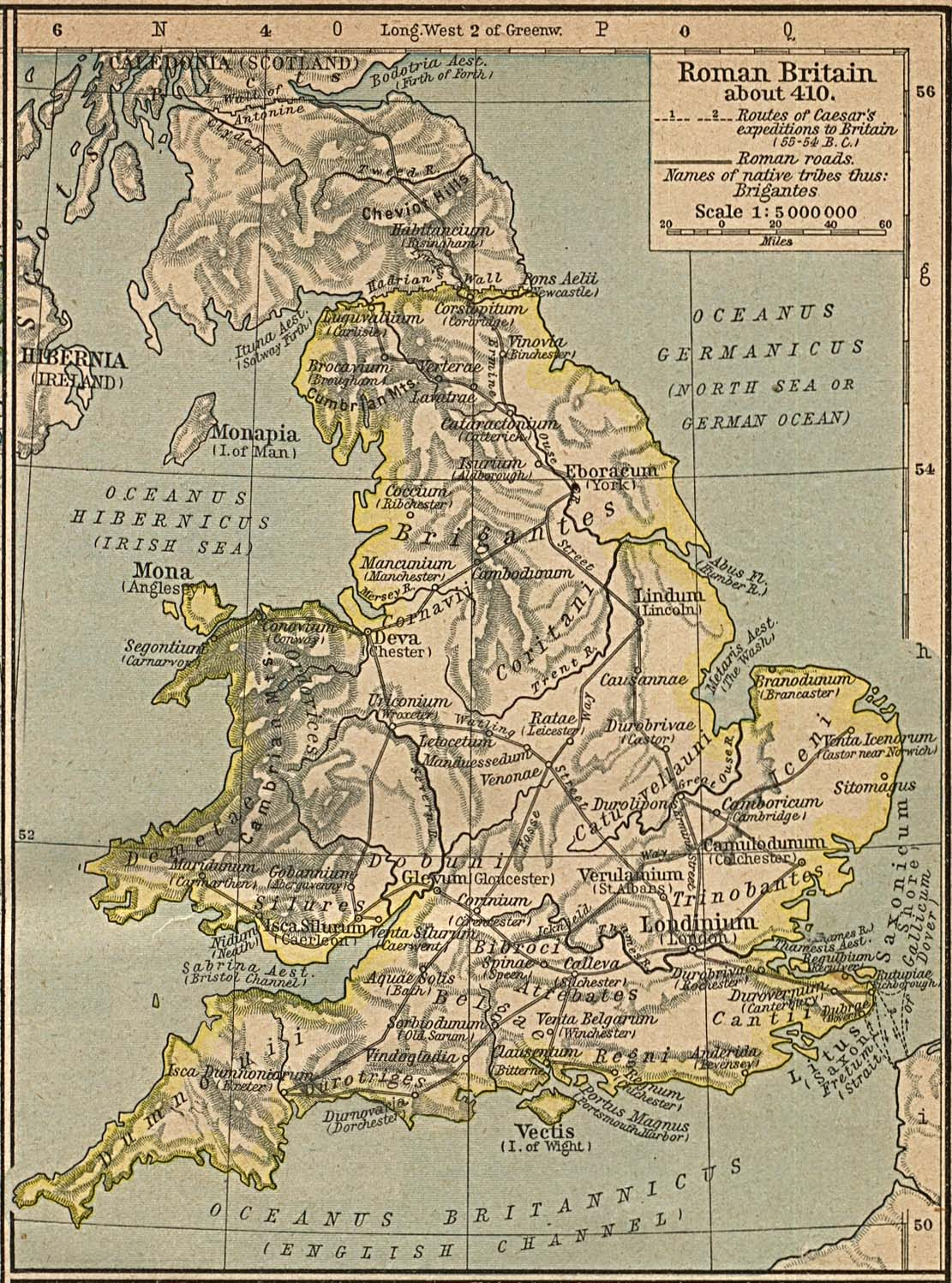
Roman Britain around AD 410, without speculative provincial borders.

Britannia Prima or Britannia I (Latin for "First Britain") was one of the provinces of the Diocese of the Britains created during the Diocletian Reforms at the end of the 3rd century. It was probably created after the defeat of the usurper Allectus by Constantius Chlorus in AD 296 and was mentioned in the c. 312 Verona List of the Roman provinces. Its position and capital remain uncertain, although it was probably located closer to Rome than Britannia II. At present, most scholars place Britannia I in Wales, Cornwall, and the lands connecting them. On the basis of a recovered inscription, its capital is now usually placed at Corinium of the Dobunni (Cirencester) but some emendations of the list of bishops attending the 315 Council of Arles would place a provincial capital in Isca (Caerleon) or Deva (Chester), which were known legionary bases.

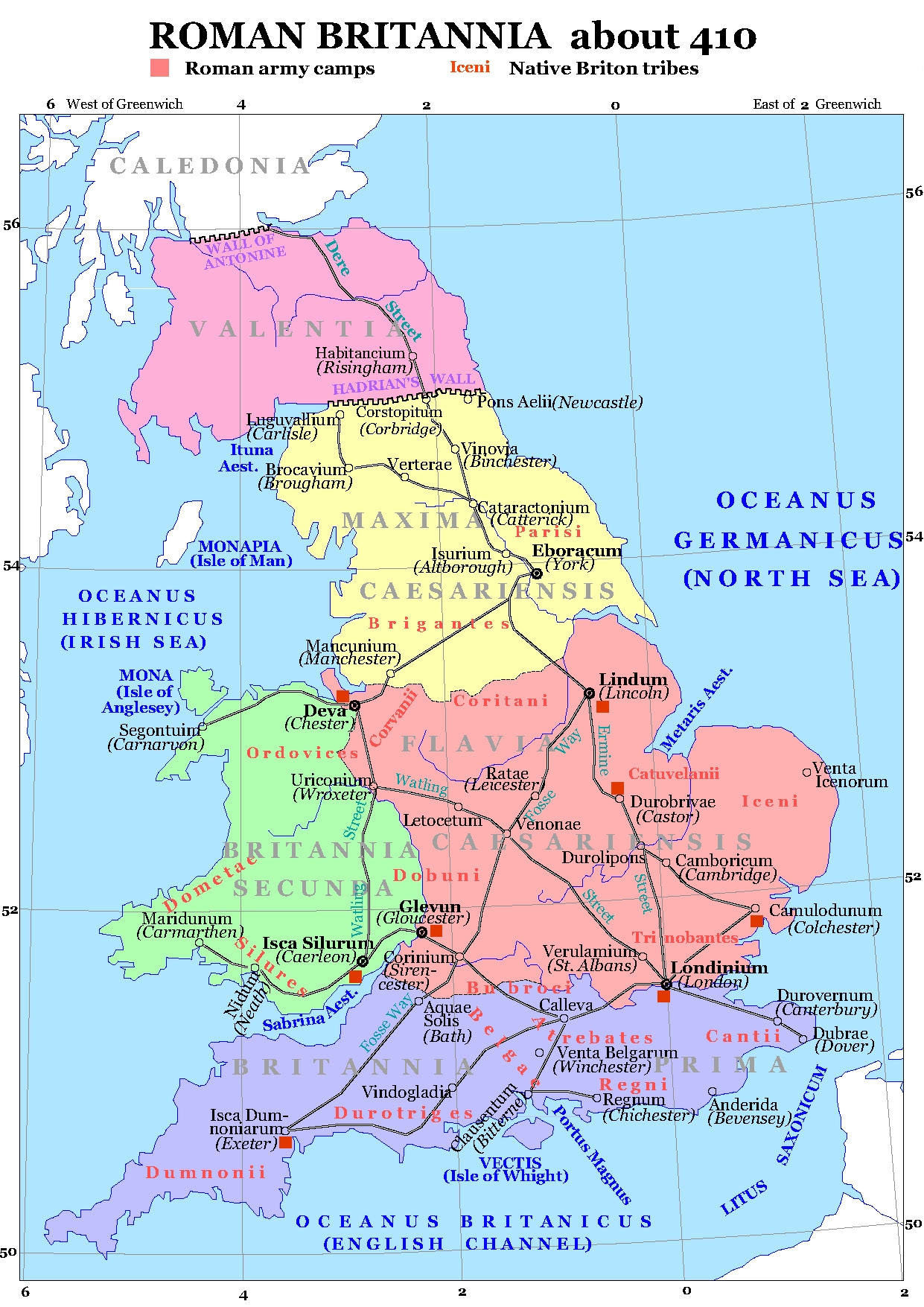
The traditional arrangement of the late Roman provinces after Camden, placing Prima along England's southern coast. On the basis of modern archaeology, the province at least reached as far north as Corinium.

== History ==
Following the Roman conquest of Britain, it was administered as a single province from Camulodunum (Colchester) and then Londinium (London) until the Severan Reforms following the revolt of its governor Clodius Albinus. These divided the territory into Upper and Lower Britain (Britannia Superior and Inferior), whose respective capitals were at Londinium and Eboracum (York). During the first phases of the Diocletian Reforms, Britain was under the control of Allectus' Britannic Empire as part of the Carausian Revolt. At some point after the territory was retaken by Constantius Chlorus in AD 296, the Diocese of the Britains (with its vicar at Londinium) was established and made a part of the Prefecture of Gaul. The Britains were then divided among three, four, or five provinces, (Note: Polemius Silvius' 5th-century Nomina Omnium Provinciarum gives six provinces, but Roman administration over the Orcades (Orkney Islands) is generally discounted. Some modern scholars such as Birley, however, believe Maxima and Flavia were originally a single province Caesariensis which was later divided. This comports with Camden and some texts of Sextus Rufus, although they make the original province Britannia Maxima.) which seem to have borne the names Prima, Secunda, Maxima Caesariensis, and (possibly) Flavia Caesariensis and Valentia. (Note: Valentia is generally treated as a later formation and placed variously beyond the Wall, around the Wall, and in Wales. It may, however, have simply been another name for the British diocese as a whole.)

The placement and capitals of these late British provinces are uncertain, although the late-4th century List of Offices describes the governor of Prima as being equestrian rank (praeses), making the province unlikely to have been based in Londinium.

Describing the metropolitan sees of the early British church established by SS Fagan and "Duvian", Gerald of Wales placed Britannia Prima in Wales and western Britain, explaining its name by reference to the legendary Brutus's first settlements. Modern scholars disregard this gloss but generally agree in placing Britannia Prima in Wales, Cornwall (Cornubia), and the area connecting them. William Camden placed Prima to the south closest to Rome and this was generally accepted after the appearance of Charles Bertram's highly-influential 1740s forgery The Description of Britain, which gave Prima borders south of the Thames and the Bristol Channel; his work was, however, debunked over the course of the mid-19th century.

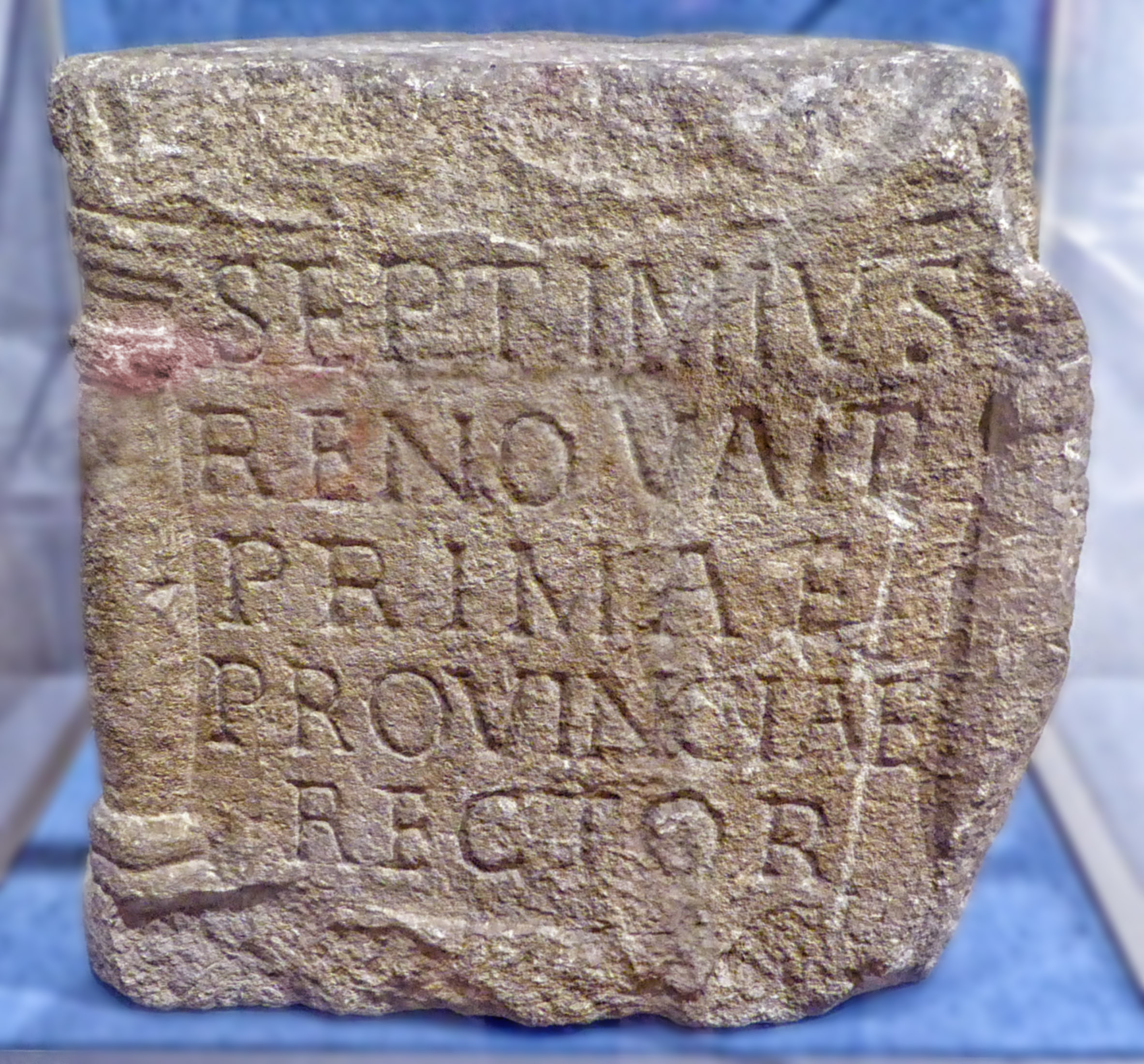
Inscription of Lucius Septimius

Owing to an inscription discovered at Corinium of the Dobunni (Cirencester) which refers to a rector of Britannia Prima named Lucius Septimius, Corinium is generally accounted as the provincial capital. The list of bishops who attended the 314 Council of Arles is patently corrupt (Note: "Nomina Episcoporum, cum Clericis Suis, Quinam, et ex Quibus Provinciis, ad Arelatensem Synodum Convenerint" ["The Names of the Bishops with Their Clerics who Came Together at the Synod of Arles and from which Province They Came"] from the Consilia in Thackery (in Latin)) but generally assumed to have mimicked the Roman administration: Camden proposed that Prima was based at London and Secunda at Caerleon and these were the two bishops apart from York. Bishop Stillingfleet and Thackery further proposed that scribal error had produced the bishop de colonia Londinensium ("from London colony") from original notes understood as Civ. Col. Londin. when Civ. Col. Leg. II (Caerleon) was intended. (Others place the bishop variously in Lincoln, Chester, and Colchester.)

== Legions ==
The Second Augustan and Twentieth Valerian legions may have still been based at Isca Augusta (Caerleon) and Deva Victrix (Chester), although this is unclear.

== Valentia ==
Ammianus records that in the year 369 Count Theodosius the Elder established or refounded the province of Valentia (further attested in the List of Offices) from lands recaptured from "the enemy". Its location is a matter of scholarly debate, but some place it in northwestern Wales with its capital at Deva (Chester). If so, it was probably intended to counter the extensive Irish piracy and raiding occurring in late antiquity.
