= Colonia (Roman) =

Roman outpost established in conquered territory to secure it

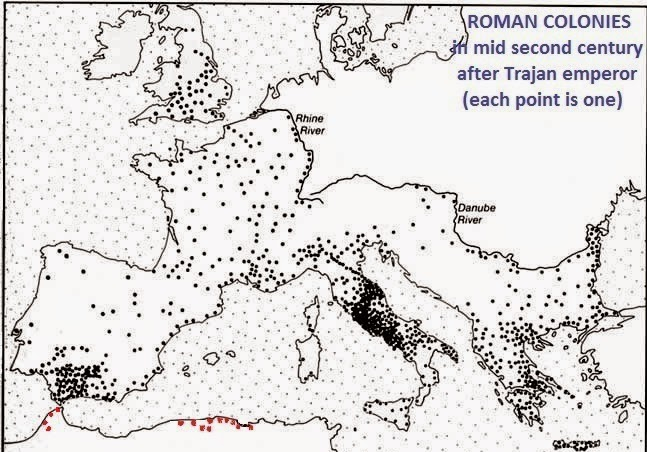
Map showing the "Roman coloniae" founded between 100 and 200 AD

A Roman colonia (pl.: coloniae) was originally a settlement of Roman citizens, establishing a Roman outpost in federated or conquered territory, for the purpose of securing it. Eventually, however, the term came to denote the highest status of a Roman city. It is also the origin of the modern term "colony".

== Characteristics ==
Under the Roman Republic, which had no standing army, their own citizens were planted in conquered towns as a kind of garrison. There were two types:

- Roman colonies, coloniae civium Romanorum or coloniae maritimae, as they were often built near the sea, e.g. Ostia (350 BC) and Rimini (268 BC). The colonists consisted of about three hundred Roman veterans with their families who were assigned from 1 to 2.5 hectares of agricultural land from the ager colonicus (state land), as well as free use of the ager compascus scripturarius (common state land) for pasture and woodland.
- Latin colonies (coloniae Latinae) were considerably larger than Roman colonies. They were military strongholds near or in enemy territory. They may have been similar to the Athenian cleruchy. The colonists were given large estates up to 35 hectares. They lost their citizenship which they could regain if they returned to Rome.

In either case three magistrates (triumviri) were appointed to manage the project.

After 133 BC tribunes introduced reforms to support the urban poor to become farmers again in new colonies as agricultural settlements (such as Tarentum in 122 BC).

Under Caesar and in the Imperial era starting from Augustus, thousands of Roman legionary veterans were granted lands in many coloniae in the empire and were responsible for the Romanization of many territories (mainly in the spread of Latin language and of Roman laws and customs).

== History ==
According to Livy, Rome's first colonies were established in about 752 BC at Antemnae and Crustumerium, both in Latium.

Other early colonies were established at Segnia in the 6th century BC, Velitrae and Norba in the 5th century BC, and Ostia, Antium, and Tarracina in the late 4th century. In this first period of colonisation, which lasted down to the end of the Punic Wars, colonies were primarily military in purpose, being intended to defend Roman territory.

The first Roman colony outside Italy was probably Italica in Hispania founded in 206 BC by Publius Cornelius Scipio during the Second Carthaginian War.

In the Empire colonies became large centres for the settlement of army veterans, especially in Roman north Africa which had the largest density of Roman colonies per region in the Roman Empire, where the Italic population constituted more than one third of the total population during the second century AD.

=== Under the Kingdom ===
- BC 752 at Antemnae and Crustumerium, both in Latium.
- BC 745 (or 737) Fidenae became a Roman colony
- BC 737 Cameria

=== Under the Republic ===
- BC 396 Veii and Fidenae defeated. 4 new tribus [election district] organised (Stellatina, Tromentana, Sabatina, Arniensis)
- BC 385 Satricum (lost and burned in BC 346)
- BC 354–349 Tibur, Praeneste, Caere(Latium) alliance agreement
- BC 332 (or after): Sutrium, Nepete (Latium),
- BC 338 Ostia colony and port

New bilateral defence contracts with Falerii, Tarquinii (Etruria) Caere (again), Pomptina and Poplilia tribus (tribes) formed in territories of Antium

- BC 338 Capua inhabitants got Roman civil rights
- BC 335 Cales (Latium)
- BC 332 (two new voting tribus established): Scaptia, Maecia
- BC 329 Anxur (Latium)
- BC 318 Falerna tribus established, Cales made contract with Rome again
- BC 318 Canusium (Apulia)

New Roman municipia made from small towns around Rome: Aricia, Lanuvium, Nomentum, Pedum, Tusculum. Latin ius contracts made with Tibur, Praeneste, Lavinium, Cora (Latium) Ius comercii contracts made with Circei, Notba, Setia, Signia, Nepi, Ardea, Gabii Ius migrationi and ius connubii Ufentina tribus established (on territories of Volscus city Antium), Privernum, Velitrae, Terracia, Fondi and Fotmiae made contract with Rome (cives sine suffragio)

- BC 303 Alba Fucens, Carsioli (Latium)
- BC 313 Suessula, Saticula (Campania)
- BC 315 Luceria (Apulia)
- BC 303 Sora (Latium)
- BC 299 Nequinum (Narnia/Narni in Etruria and Umbria) was a keypoint fortress against the Samnis tribes
- BC 296 Minturnae (Latium)
- BC 291 Venusia (Apulia) colonia (20,000 male inhabitants) to control the Samnis tribes
- BC 290 Pinceum besieged and occupied, soon became a Roman colony
- BC 290(?) Hatri (Atria) by Adriatic sea (Abruzzo)
- BC 269 Castrum Novum Picenii in BC 286), BC 264(?) Picenum colonies (Abruzzo)
- BC 289 (or in BC 283) Sena Gallica (Umbria)
- BC 273 Paestum (Latium)
- BC 273 Cosa (Etruria)
- BC 268 Beneventum (Samnium)
- BC 268 Ariminum (Aemilia)
- BC 268 Brundisium (Apulia)
- BC 264 Firmum
- BC 263 Aesernia (Samnium)
- BC 247 Alsium (Etruria)
- BC 245 Fregenae (Etruria)
- BC 222 Mediolanum (Transpadana)
- BC 218 Placentia (Aemilia)
- BC 218 Cremona (Venetia et Histria)
- BC 197–192 Volturnum, Liternum, Puteoli, Salernum (Campania) Sipontum, Buxentum (Calabria)
- BC 196 Brixia (Venetia et Histria)
- BC 193 Copia (Lucania et Bruttii)
- BC 192 Vibo Valentia (Lucania et Bruttii)
- BC 189 Bononia (Aemilia)
- BC 184 Pisaurum (Umbria), Potentia Romanorum (Lucania et Bruttii)
- BC 183 Mutina, Parma (Aemilia)
- BC 181 Aquilea (Venetia es Histria) Gravisca (Latium)
- BC 180 Portus Pisanus (Etruria)
- BC 177 Luna (Etruria)
- BC 125 Pollentia, Vardacate (Liguria)
- BC 123–118 Hasta, Dertona (Liguria)
- BC 100 Eporedia (Transpadana, today Piemonte region)
- BC 36 Tauromenium (Sicily)
- BC 21 Catina (Sicily)
- BC 21 Syracusæ (Sicily)
- BC 21 Thermæ (Sicily)
- BC 21 Tyndaris (Sicily)

=== Under the Principate ===
Colonies were not founded on a large scale until the inception of the Principate. Augustus, who needed to settle over a hundred thousand of his veterans after the end of his civil wars, began a massive colony creation program throughout his empire. However, not all colonies were new cities. Many were created from already-occupied settlements and the process of colonization just expanded them. Some of these colonies would later grow into large cities (modern day Cologne was first founded as a Roman colony). During this time, provincial cities can gain the rank of colony, gaining certain rights and privileges. After the era of the Severan emperors the new "colonies" were only cities that were granted a status (often of tax exemption), and in most cases during the Late Imperial times there was no more settlement of retired legionaries.

== Effects and legacy of colonization ==
Roman colonies sometimes served as a potential reserve of veterans which could be called upon during times of emergency. However, these colonies more importantly served to produce future Roman citizens and therefore recruits to the Roman army.

Roman colonies played a major role in the spread of the Latin language within the central and southern Italian peninsula during the early empire. The colonies showed surrounding native populations an example of Roman life. Since the veterans settled there were usually single until discharge and married local women, colonies tended to become culturally integrated in their surroundings within a few generations.

== Examples ==
| Modern name | Latin name | Modern country | Roman province | Foundation or Promotion | Founder or Promotor | additional Info |
|---|---|---|---|---|---|---|
| Arles | Colonia Iulia Paterna Arelatensis Sextanorum | France | Gallia Narbonensis | 45 BC | Julius Caesar | |
| Belgrade | Singidunum | Serbia | Moesia Superior | 239 AD | | founded by Celts c.279 BC, conquered by Romans in 15 BC |
| Budapest | Aquincum | Hungary | Pannonia | 41–54 | | |
| Butrint | Buthrotum | Albania | Epirus | 31 BC | Augustus | |
| Carteia | Carteia | Spain | Hispania Ulterior | 171 BC | Roman Senate | |
| Colchester | Colonia Claudia Victricensis Camulodunum | United Kingdom | Britannia / Britannia Superior / Maxima Caesariensis | 49 | Claudius | |
| Köln | Colonia Claudia Ara Agrippinensium | Germany | Germania Inferior | 50 | Claudius | |
| Durrës | Dyrrhachion | Albania | Macedonia | 229 BC | Roman senate | |
| Jerusalem (on the site of) | Colonia Aelia Capitolina Hierosoloma | Israel and Palestine | Judaea | After Bar Kokhba's revolt | Hadrian | |
| Lincoln | Lindum Colonia or Colonia Domitiana Lindensium | United Kingdom | Britannia / Britannia Inferior / Flavia Caesariensis | 71 | Domitian | |
| Narbonne | Colonia Iulia Paterna Claudius Narbo Martius Decumanorum | France | Gallia / Gallia Narbonensis | 118 BC | Gnaeus Domitius Ahenobarbus | refounded by Caesar in 45 BC |
| Patras | Colonia Augusta Achaica Patrensis | Greece | Achaia | After the battle of Actium | Augustus | |
| Şebinkarahisar | Colonia (Κολώνεια) | Turkey | Bithynia et Pontus | 1st century BC | Pompey | |
| Colonia Iulia Concordia Apamea | | Turkey | Bithynia-Pontus | ca. 45 BC | Iulius Caesar | |
| York | Eboracum | United Kingdom | Britannia / Britannia Inferior / Britannia Secunda | early 3rd century | Caracalla | |
| Mérida | Colonia Emerita Augusta | Spain | Hispania / Lusitania | 25 BC | Augustus | for war veterans of V Alaudae and X Gemina legions |
| Sarmizegetusa | Colonia Ulpia Traiana Sarmizegetusa | Romania | Dacia | 106–110 | Trajan | |
| Alba Iulia | Apulum | Romania | Dacia | 180-192 | Commodus | |
| Cluj Napoca | Napoca | Romania | Dacia | 2nd half of 2nd century | Commodus | |
| Drobeta-Turnu Severin | Drobeta | Romania | Dacia | 198–208 | Septimius Severus | |
| Gigen | Oescus | Bulgaria | Moesia Inferior | 106–112 | Trajan | |
| Ljubljana | Colonia Iulia Aemona | Slovenia | Illyricum | 14 or 15 | Decree of Augustus, completed by Tiberius | On the site of the Legio XV Apollinaris, after it left for Carnuntum |
| Debelt | Colonia Flavia Pancensis Deultum | Bulgaria | Thracia | After the Year of the Four Emperors | Vespasian | for veterans of VIII Augusta |
| Qalunya | Colonia Amosa or Colonia Emmaus | Israel | Judaea | After 71 | Vespasian | Might have been Emmaus of the New Testament. |
| Zaragoza/Saragossa | Caesaraugusta | Spain | Hispania Tarraconensis | Between 25 BC and 11 BC | Augustus | To settle army veterans from the Cantabrian wars. |
| Augsburg | Augusta Vindelicorum | Germany | Raetia | 15 BC | Augustus | The name means "the Augustan city of the Vindelici" |

== See also ==
- Local government (ancient Roman)
- Municipium
- Duumviri
- Colonies in antiquity
- List of ancient cities in Thrace and Dacia
- List of ancient cities in Illyria
- List of Roman colonies
- Roman citizenship
