= Britannia Secunda =

Britannia Secunda Provincia de Britannia Secunda (Latin)
- Province of Roman Empire (c. AD 296 - 395); Western Roman Empire (c. AD 395 - 410)
- c. AD 296 – AD 410
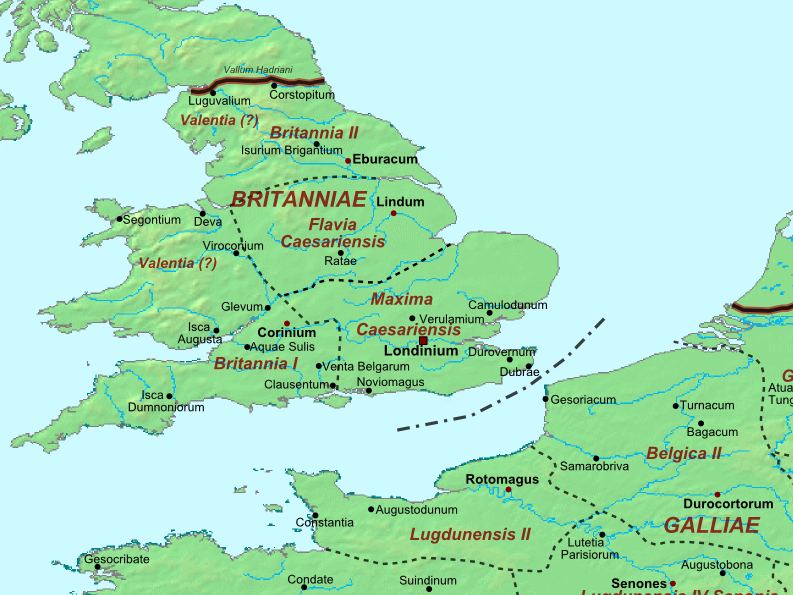
- Another possible arrangement of the late Roman provinces, with Prima in Wales and Cornwall
- Capital: Eboracum (modern-day York)
- Historical era: Late antiquity
  - Establishment: c. AD 296
  - Dissolution: c. AD 410
Preceded by	Succeeded by
Britannia Inferior	Sub-Roman Britain
- Today part of: United Kingdom

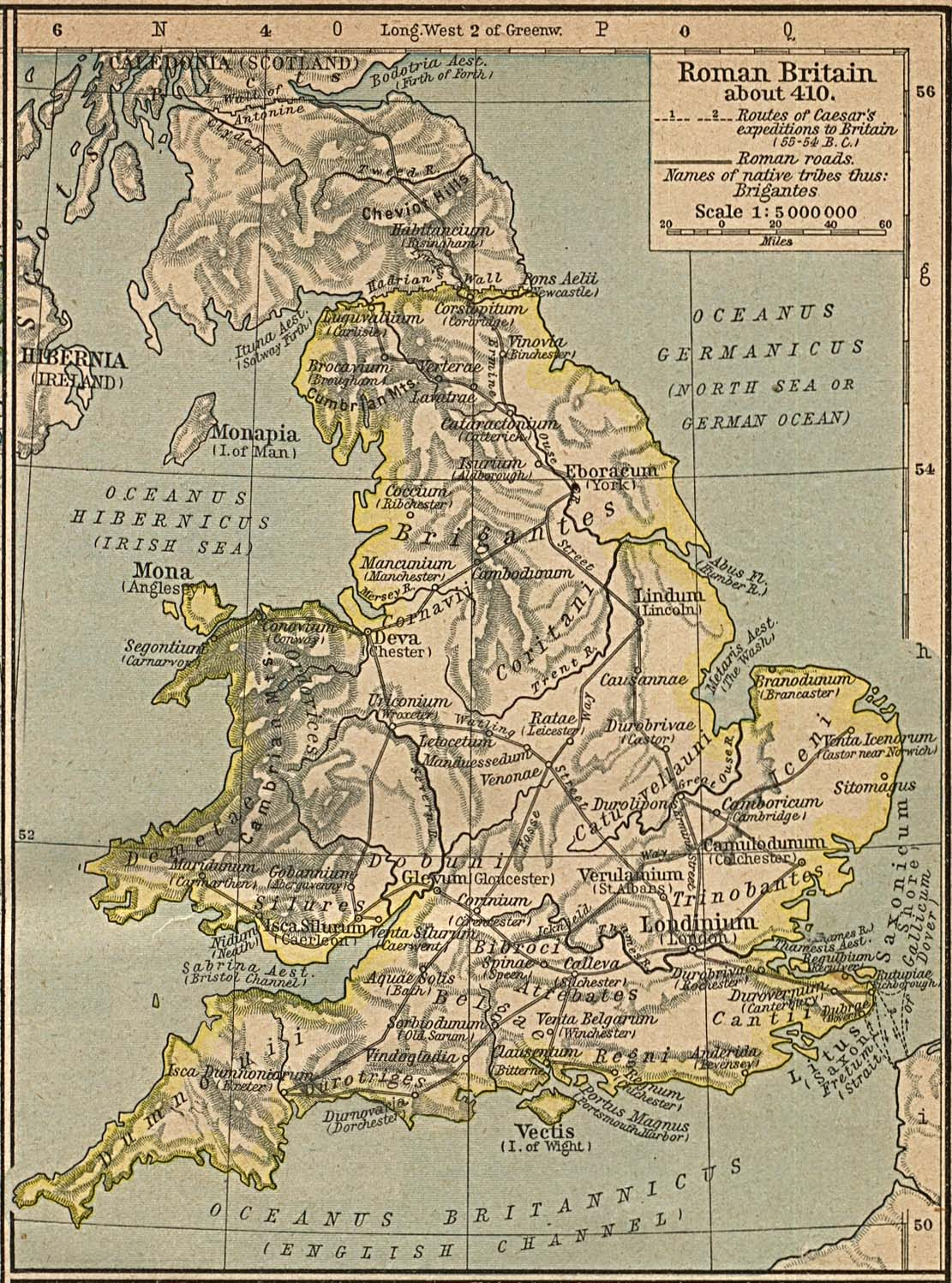
Roman Britain around AD 410, without speculative provincial borders.

Britannia Secunda or Britannia II (Latin for "Second Britain") was one of the provinces of the Diocese of "the Britains" created during the Diocletian Reforms at the end of the 3rd century. It was probably created after the defeat of the usurper Allectus by Constantius Chlorus in AD 296 and was mentioned in the c. 312 Verona List of the Roman provinces. Its position and capital remain uncertain, although it probably lay further from Rome than Britannia I. At present, most scholars place Britannia II in Yorkshire and northern England. If so, its capital would have been Eboracum (York).

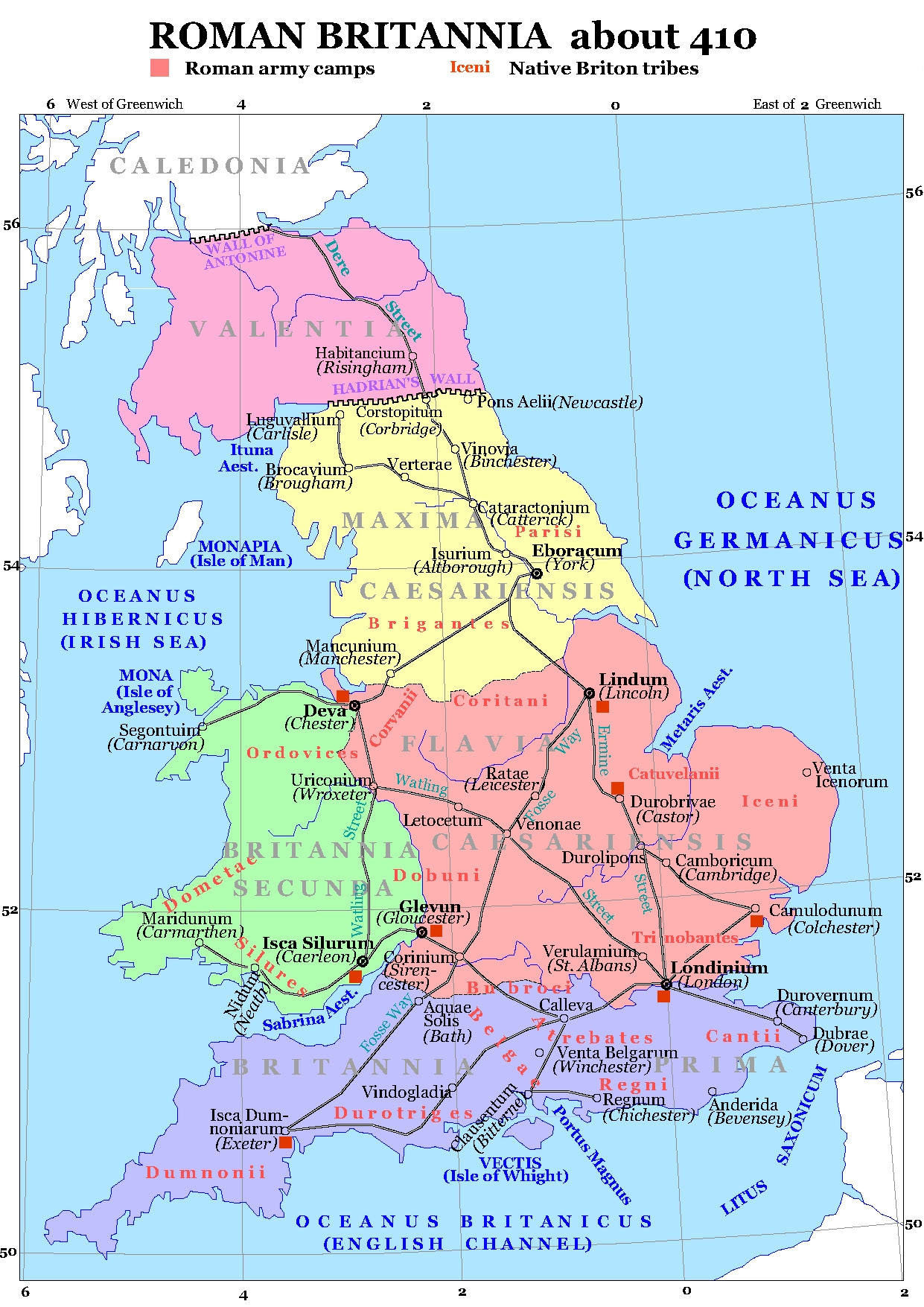
The traditional arrangement of the late Roman provinces after Camden, placing Secunda in Wales. On the basis of modern archaeology, Prima at least reached as far north as Corinium.

== History ==
Following the Roman conquest of Britain, it was administered as a single province from Camulodunum (Colchester) and then Londinium (London) until the Severan Reforms following the revolt of its governor Clodius Albinus. These divided the territory into Britannia Superior and Britannia Inferior, whose respective capitals were at Londinium and Eboracum. During the first phases of the Diocletian Reforms, Britain was under the control of the Allectus's Britannic Empire as part of the Carausian Revolt. At some point after the territory was retaken by Constantius Chlorus in AD 296, the Diocese of the Britains (with its vicar at Londinium) was formed and made a part of Prefecture of Gaul. The Britains were divided among three, four, or five provinces, (Note: Polemius Silvius's 5th-century Nomina Omnium Provinciarum gives six provinces, but Roman administration over the Orcades (Orkney) is generally discounted. Some modern scholars such as Birley, however, believe Maxima and Flavia were originally a single province Caesariensis which was later divided. This comports with Camden and some texts of Sextus Rufus, although they make the original province Britannia Maxima.) which seem to have borne the names Prima, Secunda, Maxima Caesariensis, and (possibly) Flavia Caesariensis and Valentia. (Note: Valentia is generally treated as a later formation and placed variously beyond the Wall, around the Wall, and in Wales. It may, however, have simply been another name for the British diocese as a whole.)

The placement and capitals of these late British provinces are uncertain, although the Notitia Dignitatum lists the governor (praeses) of Britannia II as being equestrian rank, making it unlikely to have been based in Londinium. The list of bishops who attended the 314 Council of Arles is patently corrupt (Note: "Nomina Episcoporum, cum Clericis Suis, Quinam, et ex Quibus Provinciis, ad Arelatensem Synodum Convenerint" ["The Names of the Bishops with Their Clerics who Came Together at the Synod of Arles and from which Province They Came"] from the Consilia in Thackery (in Latin)) but generally assumed to have mimicked the Roman administration: it seems certain one of the bishops was from Eboracum, even if his name ("Eborius") was a scribal error.

== Camden ==
William Camden argued for a placement of Secunda in Wales and Charles Bertram's highly-influential forgery On the State of Britain placed Secunda gave it borders on the Dee and Severn; this was generally accepted from the mid-18th to the mid-19th century before being revealed as a fraud. It has been generally discounted since the discovery of inscriptions showing western England was part of Prima, with a possible capital at Corinium.

== Valentia ==
Ammianus records that in the year 369 Count Theodosius established or refounded the province of Valentia (further attested in the List of Offices) from lands recaptured from "the enemy". Its location is a matter of scholarly debate, but some place it at Hadrian's Wall in the area around Luguvalium (Carlisle). If so, it would have been formed at some point in the 4th century out of territory formerly administered from Eboracum. Others place it between Hadrian's Wall and the Antonine Wall or in Wales in the area around Deva (Chester); in both cases, some of the territory also may have been formerly administered from Eboracum prior to the reörganization.
