= Caesariensis =

Caesariensis may refer to:

- Flavia Caesariensis, one of the provinces of northern Roman Britain
- Mauretania Caesariensis, an ancient Roman province in North Africa
- Maxima Caesariensis, one of the provinces of southern Roman Britain
- Priscianus Caesariensis (6th century), Latin grammarian
