= Flavia Caesariensis =

Flavia Caesariensis Provincia de Flavia Caesariensis (Latin)
- Province of Roman Empire (c. AD 296 - 395), Western Roman Empire (c. AD 395 - 410)
- c. AD 296 – AD 410
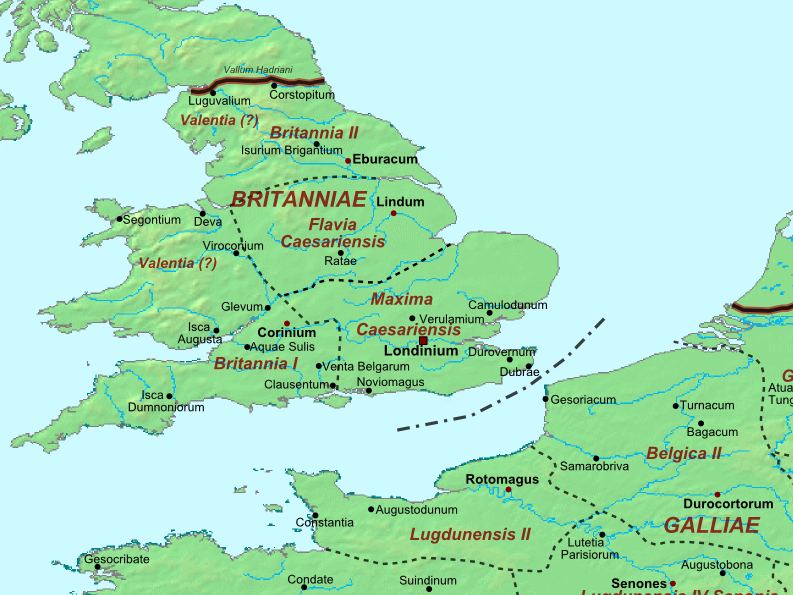
- Another possible arrangement of the late Roman provinces, with more northerly borders for Flavia
- Capital: Lindum Colonia (modern-day Lincoln)
- Historical era: Antiquity
  - Reform of Diocletian: c. AD 296
  - End of Roman rule: c. AD 410
Preceded by	Succeeded by
Roman Britain; Britannia Inferior	Sub-Roman Britain
- Today part of: United Kingdom

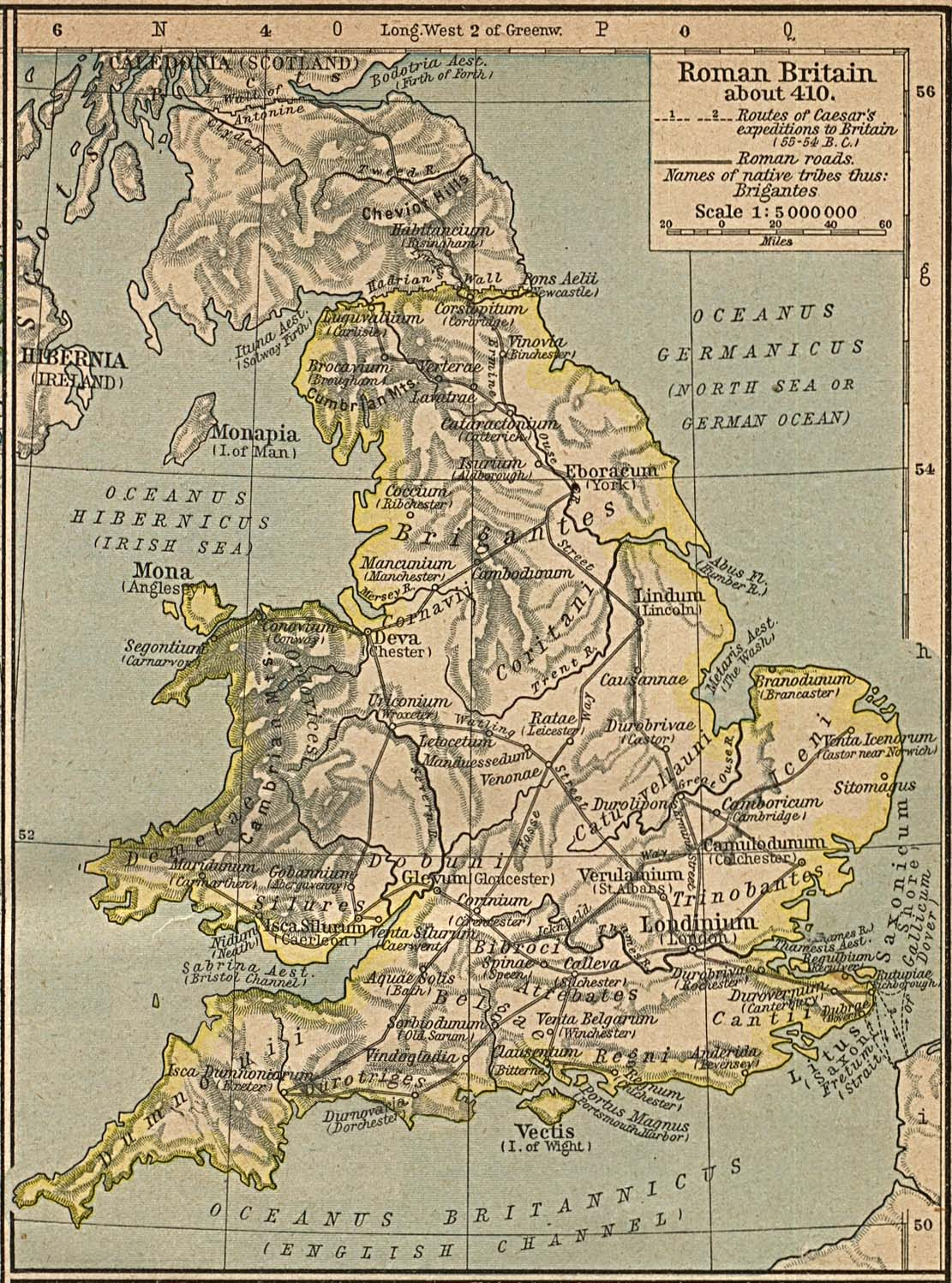
Roman Britain around AD 410, without speculative provincial borders.

Flavia Caesariensis (Latin for "The Caesarian province of Flavius"), sometimes known as Britannia Flavia, was one of the provinces of the Diocese of "the Britains" created during the Diocletian Reforms at the end of the 3rd century. It was probably created after the defeat of the usurper Allectus by Constantius Chlorus in AD 296 and was mentioned in the c. 312 Verona List of the Roman provinces. It seems to have been named after Chlorus's family and was probably located beside Maxima Caesariensis, but their positions and capitals remain uncertain. At present, most scholars place Flavia Caesariensis in the southern Pennines, possibly reaching the Irish Sea and including the lands of the Iceni. Its capital is sometimes placed at Lindum Colonia (Lincoln).

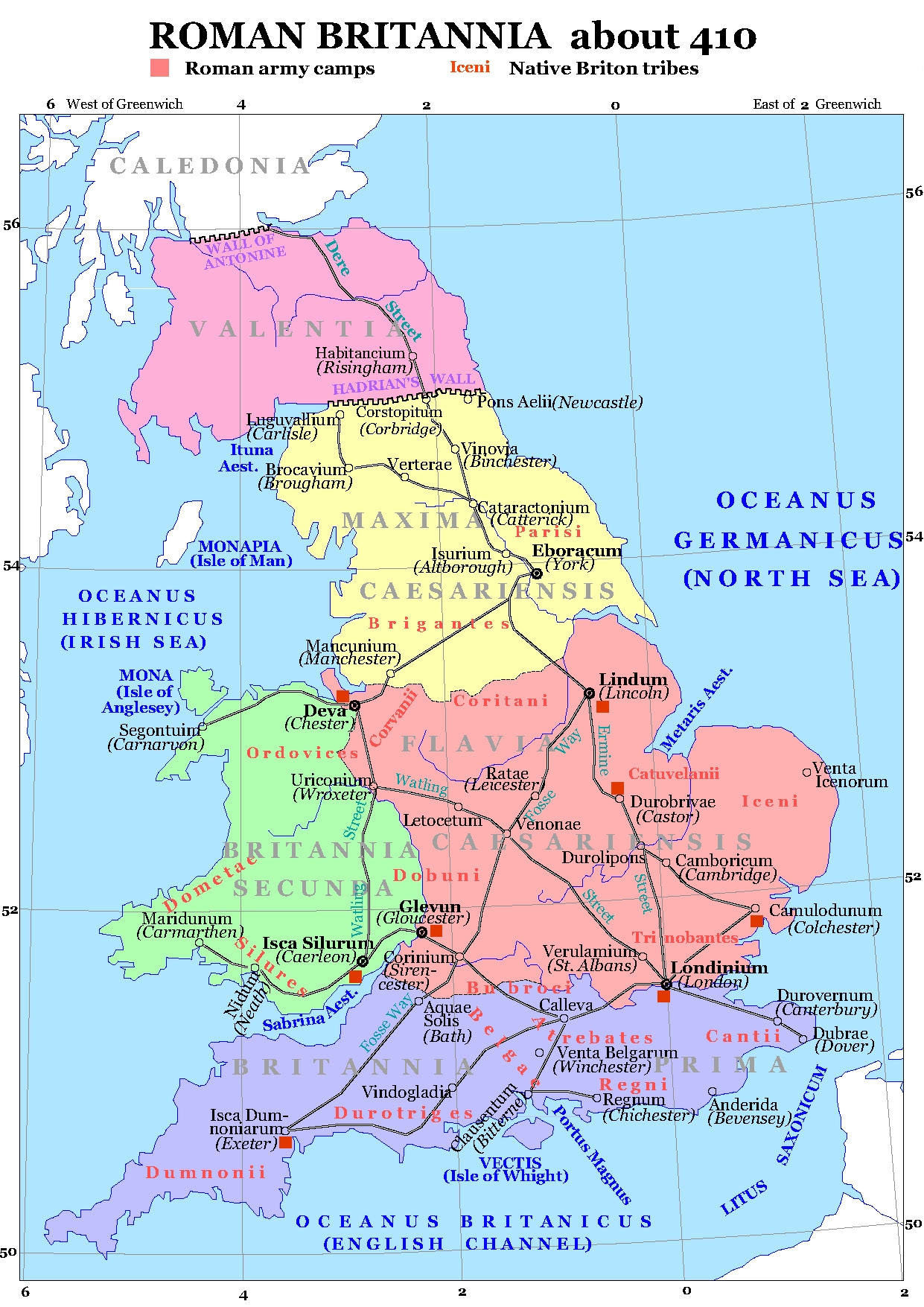
The traditional arrangement of the late Roman provinces after Camden, placing Flavia in central England. On the basis of modern archaeology, it's known that at least Corinium was part of Britannia I.

== History ==
Following the Roman conquest, Britain was administered as a single province from Camulodunum (Colchester) and then Londinium (London) until the Severan Reforms following the revolt of its governor Clodius Albinus. These divided the territory into Upper and Lower Britain (Britannia Superior and Inferior), whose respective capitals were at Londinium and Eboracum (York). During the first phases of the Diocletian Reforms, Britain was under the control of the Allectus's Britannic Empire as part of the Carausian Revolt. At some point after the territory was retaken by Constantius Chlorus in AD 296, the Diocese of the Britains (with its vicar at Londinium) was formed and made a part of Prefecture of Gaul. The Britains were divided among three, four, or five provinces, (Note: Polemius Silvius's 5th-century Nomina Omnium Provinciarum gives six provinces, but Roman administration over the Orcades (Orkney Islands) is generally discounted. Some modern scholars such as Birley, however, believe Maxima and Flavia were originally a single province Caesariensis which was later divided. This comports with Camden and some texts of Sextus Rufus, although they make the original province Britannia Maxima.) which seem to have borne the names Prima, Secunda, Maxima Caesariensis, and (possibly) Flavia Caesariensis and Valentia. (Note: Valentia is generally treated as a later formation and placed variously beyond the Wall, around the Wall, and in Wales. It may, however, have simply been another name for the British diocese as a whole.)

The placement and capitals of these late British provinces are uncertain, although the Notitia Dignitatum lists the governor (praeses) of Flavia being of equestrian rank, making it unlikely to have been based in Londinium. The list of bishops who attended the 314 Council of Arles is patently corrupt (Note: "Nomina Episcoporum, cum Clericis Suis, Quinam, et ex Quibus Provinciis, ad Arelatensem Synodum Convenerint" ["The Names of the Bishops with Their Clerics who Came Together at the Synod of Arles and from which Province They Came"] from the Consilia in Thackery (in Latin)) but generally assumed to have mimicked the Roman administration: the identification of Lindum Colonia as a provincial capital rests on proposed emendations of one or the other of the bishops from the cities Londinensi and colonia Londinensium. Those emendations are highly speculative: Bishop Ussher proposed Colonia, Selden Camaloden or Camalodon, and Spelman Camalodunum (all various names of Colchester); Camden took it as Caerleon, with Bishop Stillingfleet and Thackery proposing that a scribal error created Civ. Col. Londin. from an original Civ. Col. Leg. II (Caerleon).

Describing the metropolitan sees of the early British church established by SS Fagan and "Duvian", Gerald of Wales placed Flavia around London, extending into Mercia. Bertram's highly-influential forgery The Description of Britain placed it similarly: although not including London, it included central England and was bound by the Severn, the Thames, the North Sea, and the Humber and Mersey; this was accepted for a century from the 1740s to the 1840s before being revealed as a forgery. Modern scholars usually place Londinium in Maxima rather than Flavia. Birley has argued that Maxima and Flavia originally consisted of a single province, which received the name Britannia Caesariensis as a mark of favour for support against the rebel Allectus in 296. Although Flavia is usually thought to have been formed from the old province of Lower Britain, Birley proposes that Upper Britain was divided in two (between Prima and Caesariensis) and then three (Prima, Maxima, and Flavia). This repeats Camden's earlier theory (relying on Sextus Rufus) that Maxima was formed first and Flavia followed sometime after. Supporters of a later creation of Flavia note that it need not refer to Constantius Chlorus himself: instead, it may have honored any of Constantine, Valentinian, or Theodosius.
