= Maxima Caesariensis =

Province of Roman Britain

Maxima Cæsariensis Provincia de Maxima Cæsariensis (Latin)
- Roman province of Roman Empire (c. AD 296 - 395), Western Roman Empire (c. AD 395–410)
- c. AD 296 – AD 410
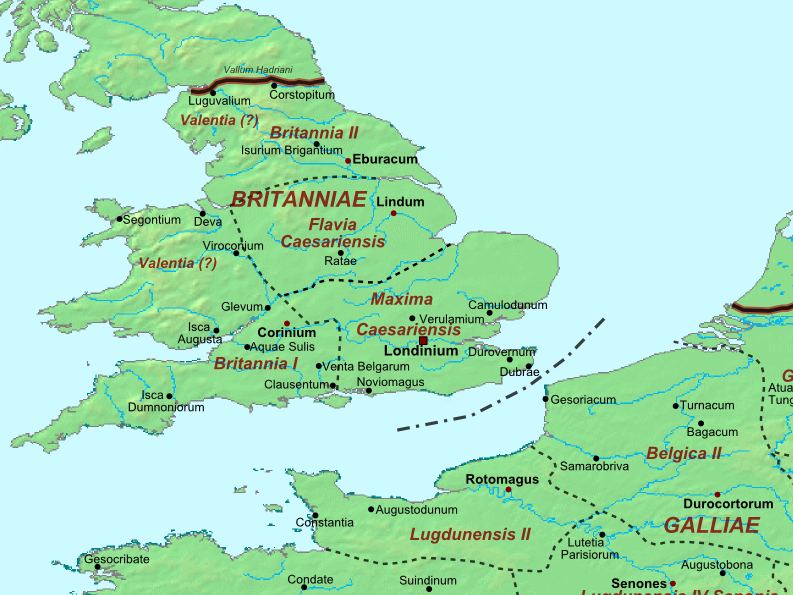
- Another possible arrangement of the late Roman provinces, with Maxima around Londinium (London)
- Capital: Londinium (modern-day London)
- Historical era: Late antiquity
  - Reform of Diocletian: c. AD 296
  - The division of administrative boundaries into two through reorganization: c. AD 5th century
  - End of Roman rule: c. AD 410
Preceded by	Succeeded by
Roman Britain; Britannia Superior	Sub-Roman Britain
- Today part of: United Kingdom

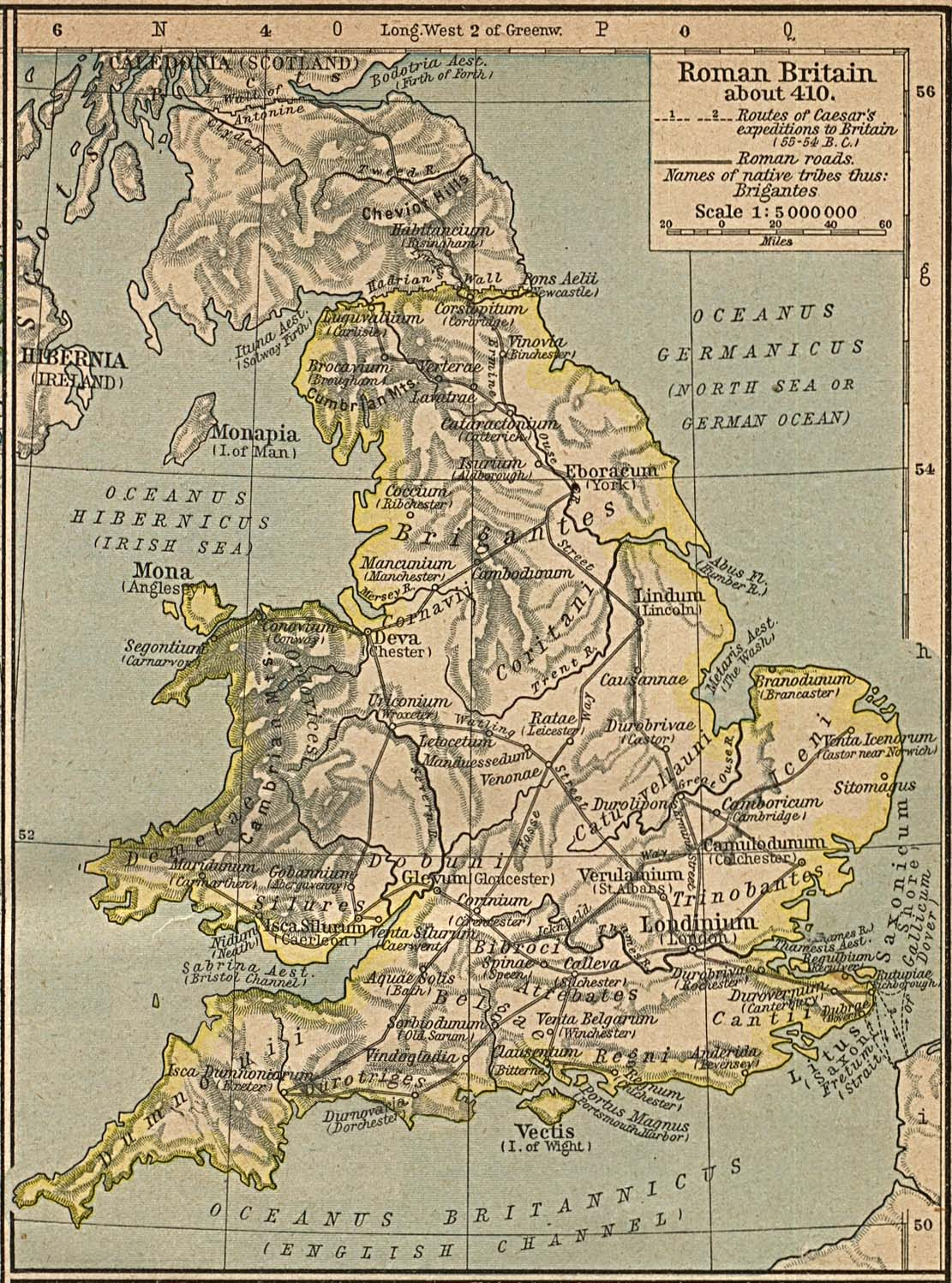
Roman Britain around AD 410, without speculative provincial borders.

Maxima Caesariensis (Latin for "The Caesarian province of Maximus"), also known as Britannia Maxima, was one of the provinces of the Diocese of "the Britains" created during the Diocletian Reforms at the end of the 3rd century. It was probably created after the defeat of the usurper Allectus by Constantius Chlorus in AD 296 and was mentioned in the c. 312 Verona List of the Roman provinces. Its position and capital remain uncertain, although it was probably adjacent to Flavia Caesariensis. On the basis of its governor's eventual consular rank, it is now usually considered to have consisted of Augusta or Londinium (London) and southeastern England.

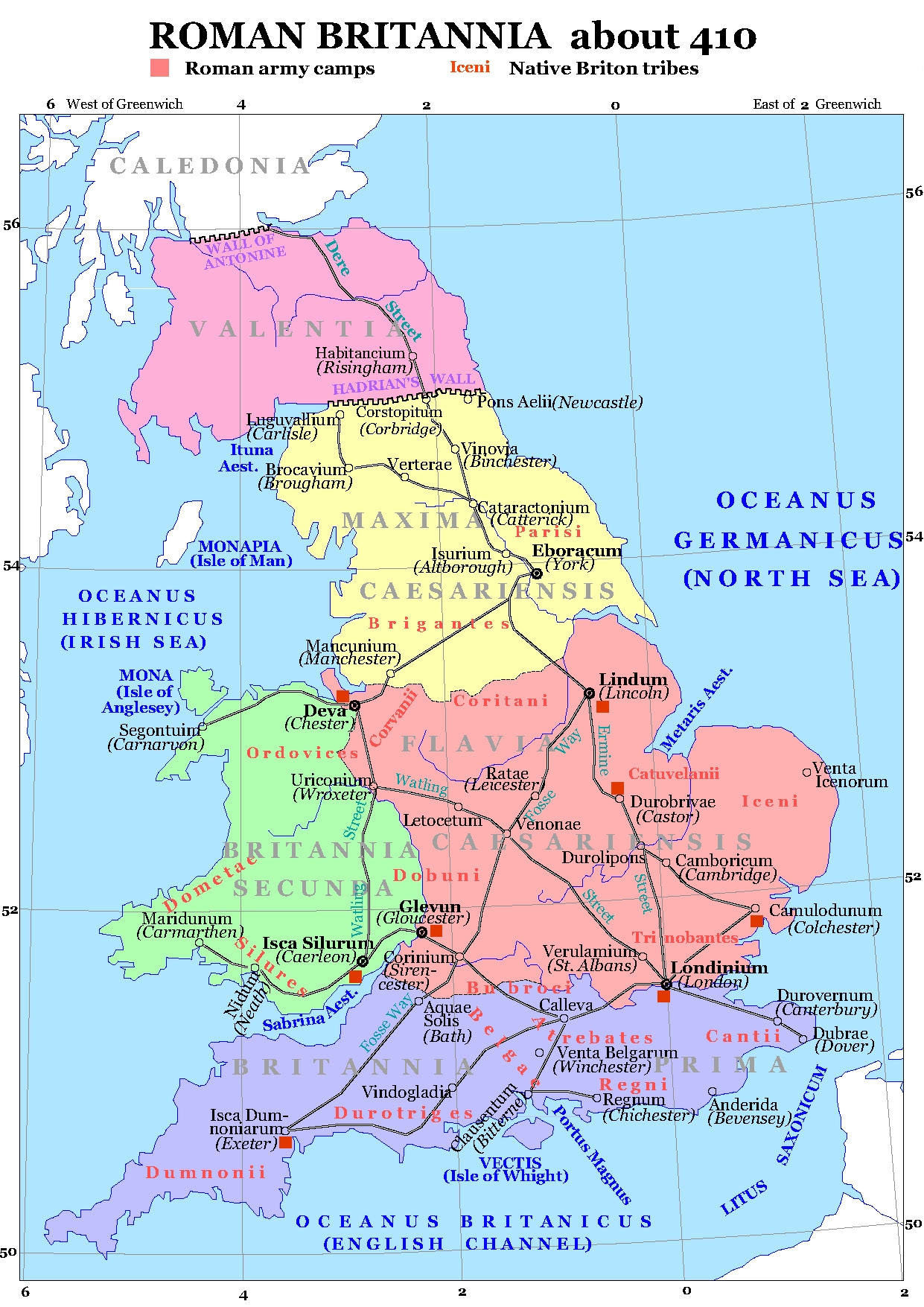
The traditional arrangement of the late Roman provinces after Camden, placing Maxima around Eburacum (York)

== History ==
Following the Roman conquest of Britain, Britain was administered as a single province from Camulodunum (Colchester) and then Londinium (London) until the Severan Reforms following the revolt of its governor Clodius Albinus. These divided the territory into Upper and Lower Britain (Britannia Superior and Inferior), whose respective capitals were at Londinium and Eboracum (York). During the first phases of the Diocletian Reforms, Britain was under the control of the Allectus's Britannic Empire as part of the Carausian Revolt. At some point after the territory was retaken by Constantius Chlorus in AD 296, the Diocese of the Britains (with its vicar at Londinium) was formed and made a part of Prefecture of Gaul. The Britains were divided among three, four, or five provinces, (Note: Polemius Silvius's 5th-century Nomina Omnium Provinciarum gives six provinces, but Roman administration over the Orcades (Orkney Islands) is generally discounted. Some modern scholars such as Birley, however, believe Maxima and Flavia were originally a single province Caesariensis which was later divided. This comports with Camden and some texts of Sextus Rufus, although they make the original province Britannia Maxima.) which seem to have borne the names Prima, Secunda, Maxima Caesariensis, and (possibly) Flavia Caesariensis and Valentia. (Note: Valentia is generally treated as a later formation and placed variously beyond the Wall, around the Wall, and in Wales. It may, however, have simply been another name for the British diocese as a whole.)

The placement and capitals of these late British provinces are uncertain, although the Notitia Dignitatum lists the governor of Maxima (originally an equestrian praeses) as having been elevated to consular rank. Scholars usually associate this with the administration at Londinium, which was also the capital of the diocesan vicar. (Note: Although note that the Notitia gave the same rank to the governor of the disputed province of Valentia.)

Describing the metropolitan sees of the early British church established by SS Fagan and "Duvian", Gerald of Wales placed "Maximia" in Eboracum (York) and Londinium in Flavia, saying the former was named for the emperor Maximus. William Camden followed him and this placement was generally accepted after the appearance of Charles Bertram's highly-influential 1740s forgery The Description of Britain, which gave Maxima borders from the Humber and Mersey to Hadrian's Wall; this work was debunked over the course of the mid-19th century.

Modern scholars are uncertain whether the province was named for the western senior emperor Valerius Maximian or the eastern junior emperor Galerius Maximian. (Note: Both are problematic, since there is no known reason to have named a British province after the eastern caesar but Constantius Chlorus's senior partner was not a caesar but an augustus.) Birley has argued that Maxima and Flavia originally consisted of a single province, which received the name Britannia Caesariensis as a mark of favour for support against the rebel Allectus in 296. Although Flavia is usually thought to have been formed from the old province of Lower Britain, Birley proposes that Upper Britain was divided in two (between Prima and Caesariensis) and then three (Prima, Maxima, and Flavia). This repeats Camden's earlier theory (relying on Sextus Rufus) that Maxima was formed first and Flavia followed sometime after.
