= Titus Desticius Juba =

Roman governor of Britannia Superior, 253–258 CE

Titus Desticius Juba was a Roman governor of Britannia Superior between 253 and 258. According to Anthony R. Birley, Desticius Juba was the last "known instance of a consular governor of Upper Britain, and indeed of any consular governor with senatorial legates and legions under him."

Desticius Juba likely had his origins at Concordia in northern Italy, where numerous inscriptions have been found attesting to Desticii, including those with the praenomen Titus, and those with the cognomen "Juba". He had served in Rome as a suffect consul and some time later was posted to Britannia Superior. An inscription found c. 1845 near modern-day Caerleon explicitly names him a legatus Augusti pro praetore and notes that, between the years 253 and 255, he refurbished the barracks at Isca Silurum.
