= Britannia Inferior =

3rd-century Roman province in Britain

Britannia Inferior Provincia de Britannia Inferior (Latin)
- Province of Roman Empire (c. AD 197 - 296)
- c. AD 197 – AD 296
- Province of Britannia Superior, c. 210 AD
- Capital: Eboracum (modern-day York)
- Historical era: Antiquity
  - Establishment: c. AD 197
  - Dissolution: c. AD 296
Preceded by	Succeeded by
Roman Britain	Britannia Secunda; Flavia Caesariensis
- Today part of: United Kingdom

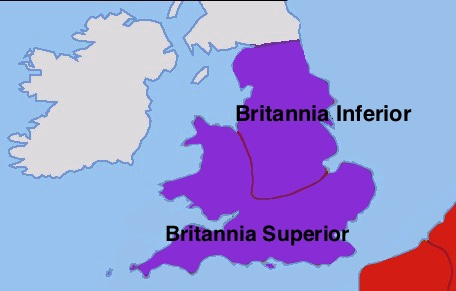
Map of Britannia Inferior in 260 AD

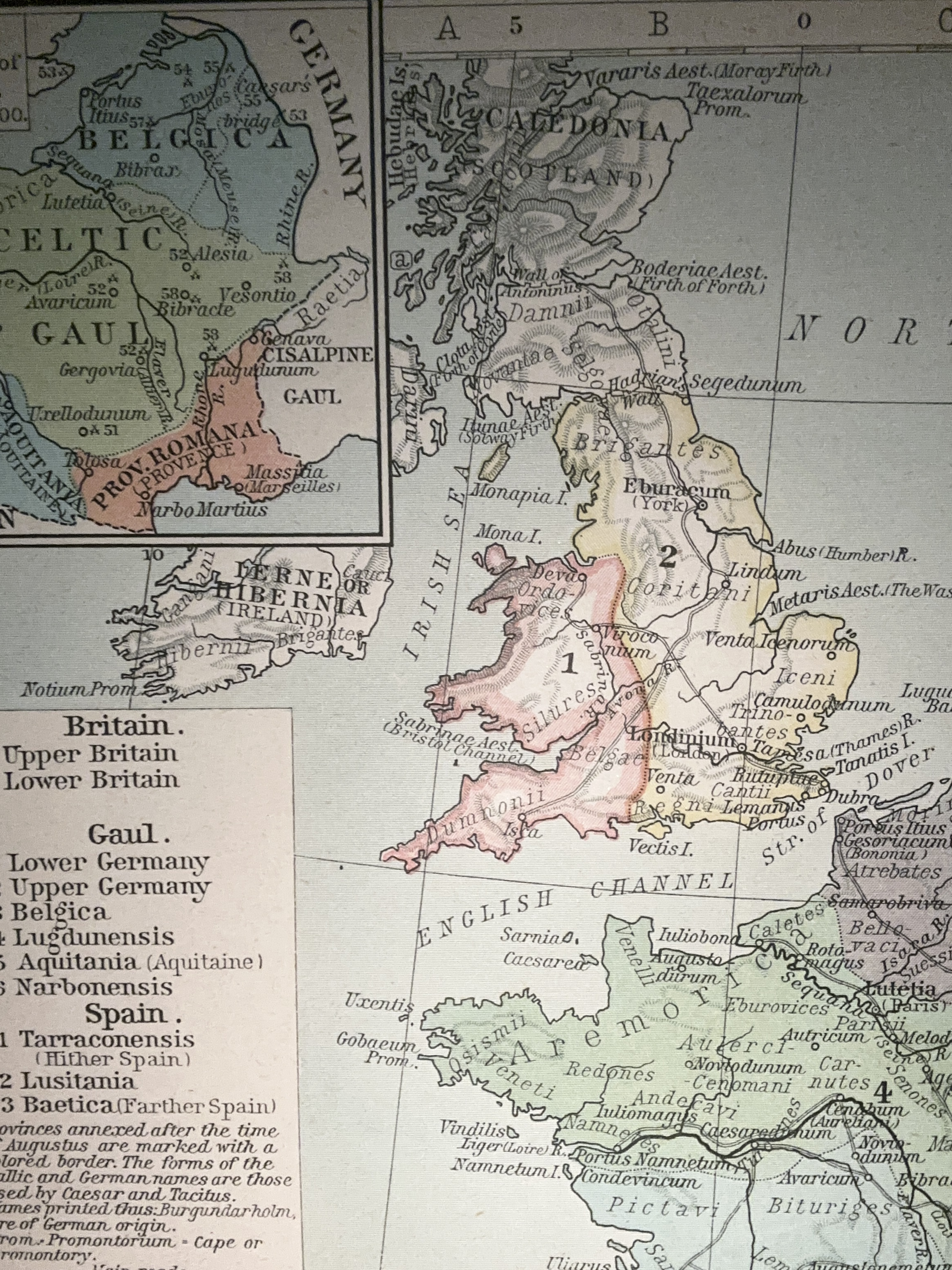

Britannia Inferior (Latin for "Lower Britain") was a new province carved out of Roman Britain probably around AD 197 during the reforms of Septimius Severus although the division may have occurred later, between 211 and 220, under Severus's son Caracalla. The removal of the governors in Londinium from control over the legions guarding Hadrian's Wall was aimed at reducing their power, given Clodius Albinus's recent bid to become emperor. The province was probably formalised around 214 by Caracalla.

Including most of modern northern England and the Midlands, the region was governed from the city of Eboracum (modern York) by a praetorian legate in command of a single legion stationed in the city. This subdivision of Britannia lasted throughout the Severan dynasty until the reorganisation of the empire under Diocletian in 296.

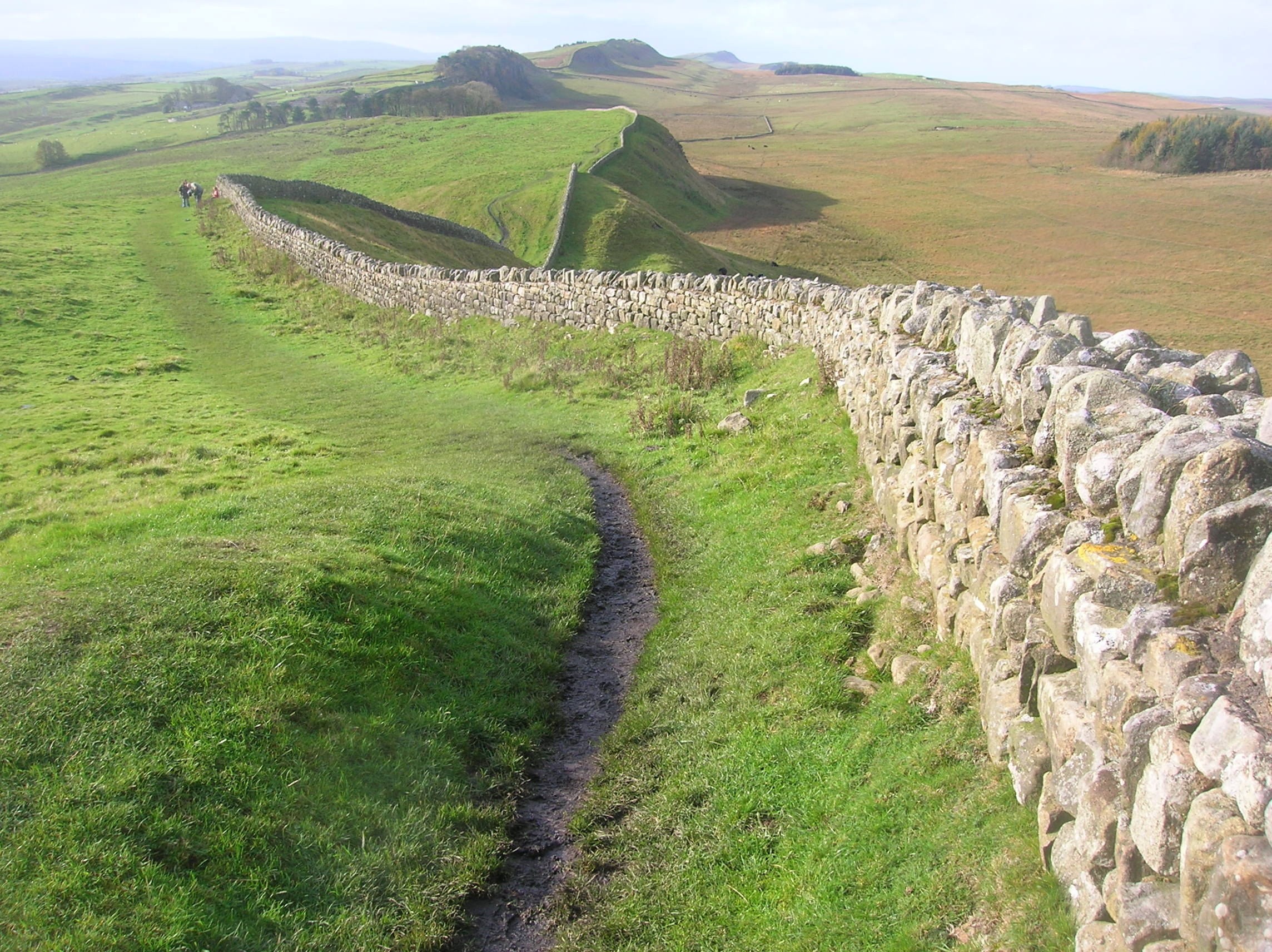
Hadrian's Wall, the northern border of Britannia Inferior

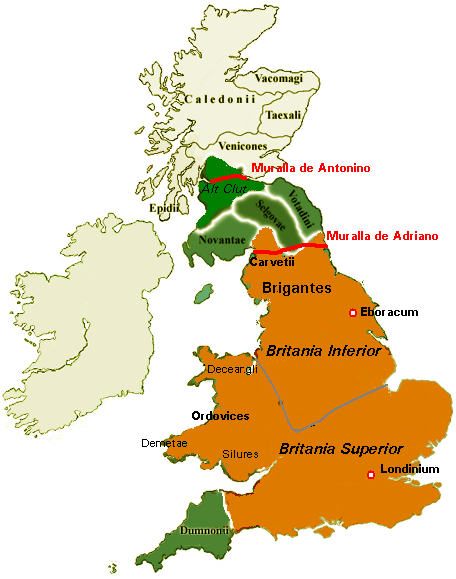
Major landmarks of the province, showing in red the Antonine Wall (top) and Hadrian's Wall (below)

== Establishment ==
During the reign of Commodus, the defences along the northern border of the empire in Britannia fell into neglect and disrepair. The peace of the region was further disturbed in the tumultuous period after Commodus' death as the military power vacuum on the continent distracted the defensive legions stationed in Britannia. After his accession in 193, Severus took special interest in refortifying the northern border in Britannia, and in 208 he moved to Eboracum to oversee the military campaigns against the northern tribes. While there is some confusion as to the exact date when the subdivision of Britannia was made, it seems clear that Severus's intentions were to break up the size of the military under the command of an individual governor (as he had done in Syria), preventing them from wielding too large a military force, or at least one that could destabilize the emperor's control.

An African inscription dated to the reign of Caracalla provides a potential early confirmation of the division occurring under Severus. Herodian puts the date of the split in 197, although there is no evidence of this distinction being formalised in inscriptions until after the death of Severus in 211. Thus, it is likely that the division of military control in Britannia was formally established by Caracalla sometime between 211 and 220. Caracalla also moved the southern border of the province northwards from the line established by Severus, transferring northern modern Wales and the region surrounding Chester to Britannia Superior.

== History ==
In the reign of Severus, the province's fortifications were significantly improved in order to provide better defence against northern tribes. A major rebuilding of Hadrian's Wall was included among these efforts. The province hosted a single legion during Caracalla's reign, the VI Victrix, which was stationed at Eboracum. However, although Britannia Inferior had only the single legion (compared to the two stationed in Britannia Superior) the northern province actually had more soldiers than the south did, as a result of the large number of auxiliaries in the north. After the successes of Severus against the northern tribes, these troops furnished small units known as exploratores which were sent beyond the frontier to oversee native activities and ensure that the terms of Roman treaties with these groups were upheld. These measures were mostly effective and during Britannia Inferior's existence the northern border was largely peaceful after the campaign of Severus.

From 260 to 273 AD Britannia Inferior, along with much of the rest of the western Empire, broke away from the rest of the Roman Empire to form the Gallic Empire. The second half of the province's history also coincided with a period of poor economic conditions across Roman Britain.

The symbol of the province, attested by several lead sealings, was a bull.

== Reorganisation ==
In 296, the emperor Diocletian conducted a major reorganisation of the empire. The newly named Diocese of Britannia was subdivided into four provinces, Britannia Prima and Maxima Caesariensis from Britannia Superior and Britannia Secunda (capital in Eboracum) and Flavia Caesariensis (capital in Lindum) from Britannia Inferior.

== See also ==
- Britannia Superior ("Upper Britain")
- Roman Britain, the Roman-controlled area in Britain, of which Britannia Inferior and Superior were the two primary subdivisions
