= Britannia Superior =

Roman province in Britain

Britannia Superior Provincia de Britannia Superior (Latin)
- Roman province of Roman Empire (c. AD 197 - 296)
- c. AD 197 – AD 296
- Province of Britannia Superior within the Roman Empire, c. 210 AD
- Capital: Londinium (modern-day London)
- Historical era: Antiquity
  - Establishment: c. AD 197
  - Dissolution: c. AD 296
Preceded by	Succeeded by
Roman Britain	Britannia Prima; Maxima Caesariensis
- Today part of: United Kingdom

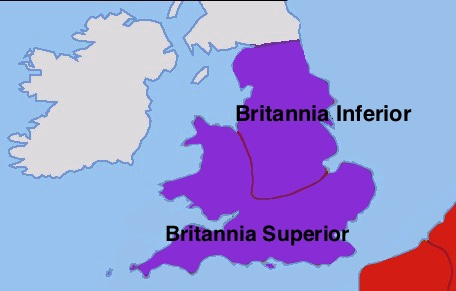
Map of Britannia Superior in 260 AD

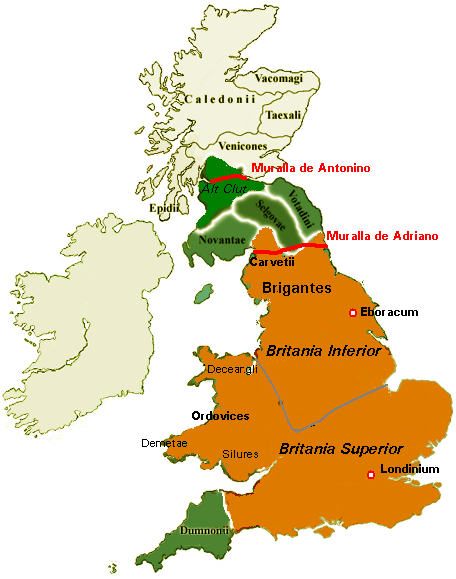
Major cities of Britannia Superior in the 2nd century

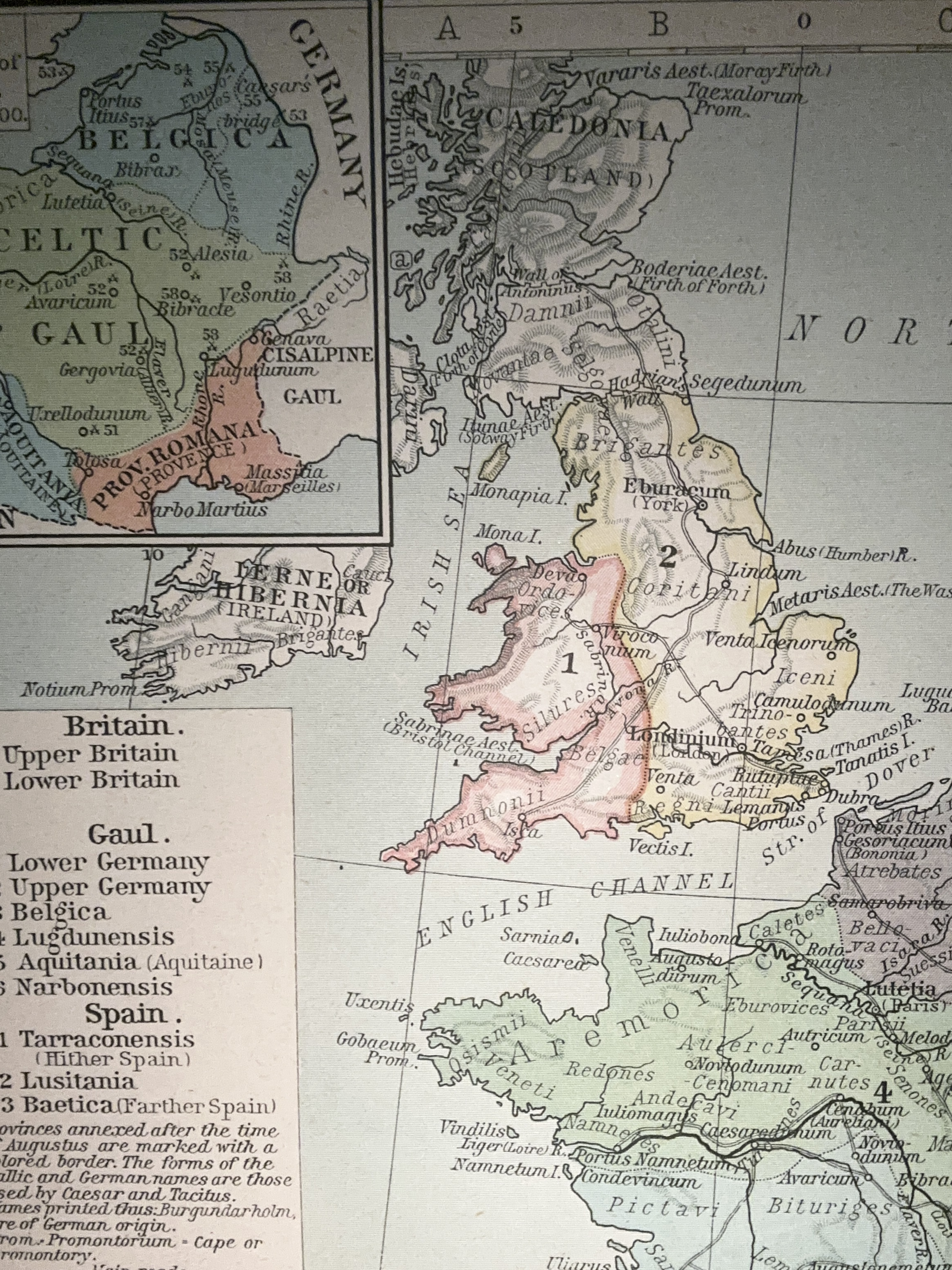
Part of a map of the European provinces of the Roman Empire, specifically of Upper and Lower Britain, offering a different perspective to the borders than is currently represented on Wiki commons. Usually printed in New York by Henry Colt and Co.

Britannia Superior (Latin for "Upper Britain") was a province of Roman Britain created after the civil war between Septimius Severus and Clodius Albinus. Although Herodian credits Severus with dividing Roman Britain into the Northern territory of Britannia Inferior and the Southern territory of Britannia Superior, modern scholarship argues that it is more likely that Caracalla was the person who made the split sometime in the early 3rd century CE. The previous British capital Londinium remained the centre of Britannia Superior while Eboracum, or modern York was the capital of Britannia Inferior. Epigraphical evidence shows that Upper Britain encompassed approximately what is now Wales, southern England and East Anglia. However, the official boundary between Britannia Superior and Inferior is still unclear.

Although Londinium went through a period of decline during this time, the province as a whole continued to be developed. Villas were expanded and a new wall around the capital was created.

Governors of Britannia Superior are difficult to trace and it is hard to decipher exactly when the province became distinct from its twin Britannia Inferior. Also, little information about their system of governance or their peoples exist today. However, some archeological research of Britannia Superior leads historians to believe that Romano-British relations may have to be restudied with a more modern approach.

Due to instability within the Roman Empire, reforms by Diocletian and Carausius' usurping total provincial power in the late 3rd century, the province was restructured by Constantius early in the 4th century.

== Build up and civil war ==
After the murder of Emperor Commodus on 31 December 192 AD, Pertinax was chosen by Commodus' conspirators as a suitable replacement for the title of Roman ruler. He would be the first of five Emperors during 193AD, known as the tumultuous Year of the Five Emperors. During this year, the leader of the Roman Empire was to be decided within a civil war between its three largest military forces. This civil war was contested by Clodius Albinus in Britain, Septimius Severus in the Danube and Syrian leader Pescinnius Niger.

Following the murder of Pertinax by his own guard on 28 March 193 AD Severus and Albinus swore an alliance as shown on the altar Ostia. The altar shows that all names (including Albinus') apart from Severus' have been etched out of the inscription. This is evidence that Severus eventually become the victor of the civil war. During the alliance with Albinus, Severus gave himself the name Petrinax to avenge the recently murdered emperor. Severus marched on Rome and disbanded the Praetorian guard with his own installment.

The tension between Severus and Albinus' contest to usurp the Roman Empire's throne resulted in the Battle of Lugdunum (modern day Lyon) on 19 February 197. According to Cassius Dio's Roman History Severus and Albinus were equally armed with 150 000 soldiers on both sides at Lyon. The skirmish went back and forth but the decisive collapse of Albinus' left wing turned the battle in favor of a Severus victory. Once he realized that his defeat was imminent Albinus committed suicide giving Severus total control of the Roman Empire.

== The split of Roman Britain ==
According to Roman historian Herodian's work History of the Empire, Severus split Roman Britain into Upper and Lower provinces soon after the Battle of Lugdunum. However there is still confusion among historians as to the exact date and circumstances behind the division of Roman Britain.

A.J. Graham argues this matter of doubt is due to a considerable lack of evidence for Herodian's division date of 197AD. Related evidence of Legion lists by Cassius Dio could possibly be used to confirm Herodian's claims but Dio's inscriptions are undated. Graham concludes that Severus did not split Roman Britain himself. Instead Graham argues the split would have officially taken place under the power Severus' co-emperor Caracella sometime between 211 and 220 AD. Graham concludes that although the specifics of the division are inconclusive the nature of the split is still important. The distinction of Superior and Inferior is important because the inferior Lower Britain lay in the northernmost part of the province. This fact reveals Caracella's passive nature of agreement and retreat with the Maetian barbarians beyond the Roman border.

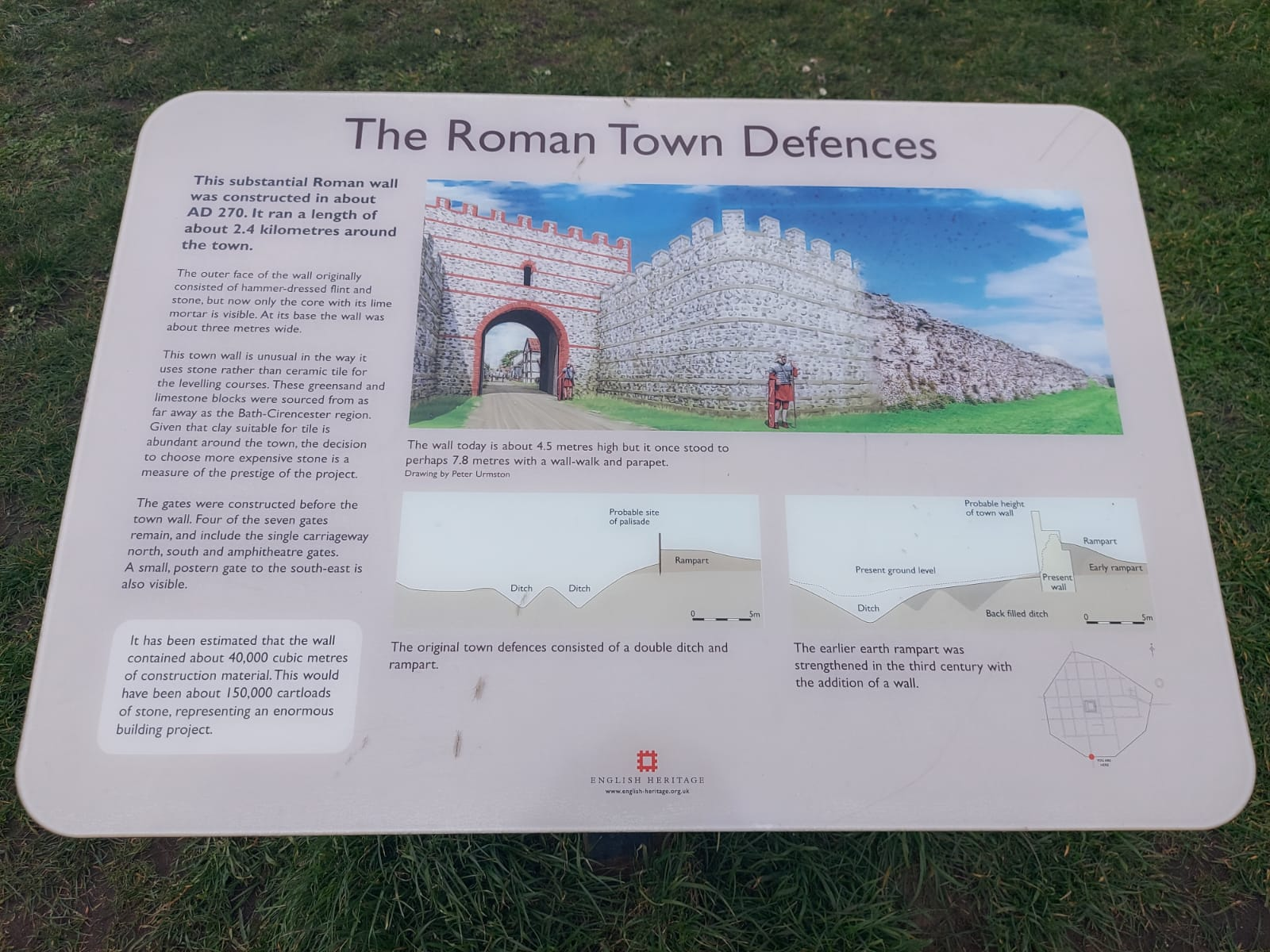
A plaque dedicated to the fortified defences at Calleva Atrebatum, a town in Britannia Superior

Epigraphical evidence shows that an inscription made during the time of Lucius Julius Julianus between 198-209 AD describes his legions being based at Caerleon in what was to become Upper Britain. This leads historians to believe Britain had still not been divided by 209 AD. This is also evidence that although fewer legions were in the north, Lower Britain relied on soldiers from the south. Evidence pointing towards the existence of a southern concord serving near Corbridge in Lower Britain exists. Another altar devoted to a southern commander proves that detachments of two Upper Britain legions were serving together on the northern frontier.

The rank between the governors of Superior and Inferior is important. Because of the division of legions historians assume that the governor of Britannia Superior held a consular rank while his opposite in Britannia Inferior was a lower praetorian rank. This also has created confusion among historians because it has been suggested that during wartime the governor of Britannia Superior would take lead of the northern armies which would vitiate the reasons behind the split in the first place. What historians can safely agree on is that Roman Britain had very different systems of rule between the imperial reign of Severus and his successor Caracalla.

Severus' influence on the split is that as Emperor he performed this same action of division by separating Roman Syria in 194 AD. However, if the division is attributed to Caracella, he did this while also readjusting the boundaries of Pannonias Superior and Pannonias Inferior in 213 or 214 AD. He divided the four total legions equally between both provinces, unlike he did in Britain. Instead two legions garrisoned Upper Britain while Lower Britain only had access to one. Although not totally a similar move, this has been extrapolated by historians as a general policy move the Roman Empire had made towards its provinces at the time.

The split of Britain into upper and lower provinces demonstrates a problem that faced the Roman province. It was necessary to prevent a large army being in the hands of a single governor on the peripheries of the empires. The power base was too strong as seen in Albinus' ability to mobilize a large military in his conflict with Severus.

The division created two separate capitals of Roman Britain. Londinium (present day London) was the capital of Superior, and Eboracum (present day York) was created as the capital of Britannia Inferior. Due to the unsettled Maetae population to the north of Britannia Inferior, Severus decided to rule the entire Roman Empire from Eboracum while trying to regain control of island.

== Buildings ==
During Britannia Superior's time as a province, the building of fortifications was seen throughout the territory. This was not for any military purpose because there was no true offensive threat to Upper Britain. Towns were fortified at their own leisure. Verulalium and Winchester had already begun to be fortified in the first century AD, but building continued throughout the second century until at least 270 AD. The building of these fortification walls may have become an area of contest, at least between the three main colonies. However, the lack of fortifications around smaller villas leads scholars to believe that there was no real threat of peasant revolt at this time even if it was on the mind of Roman elites.

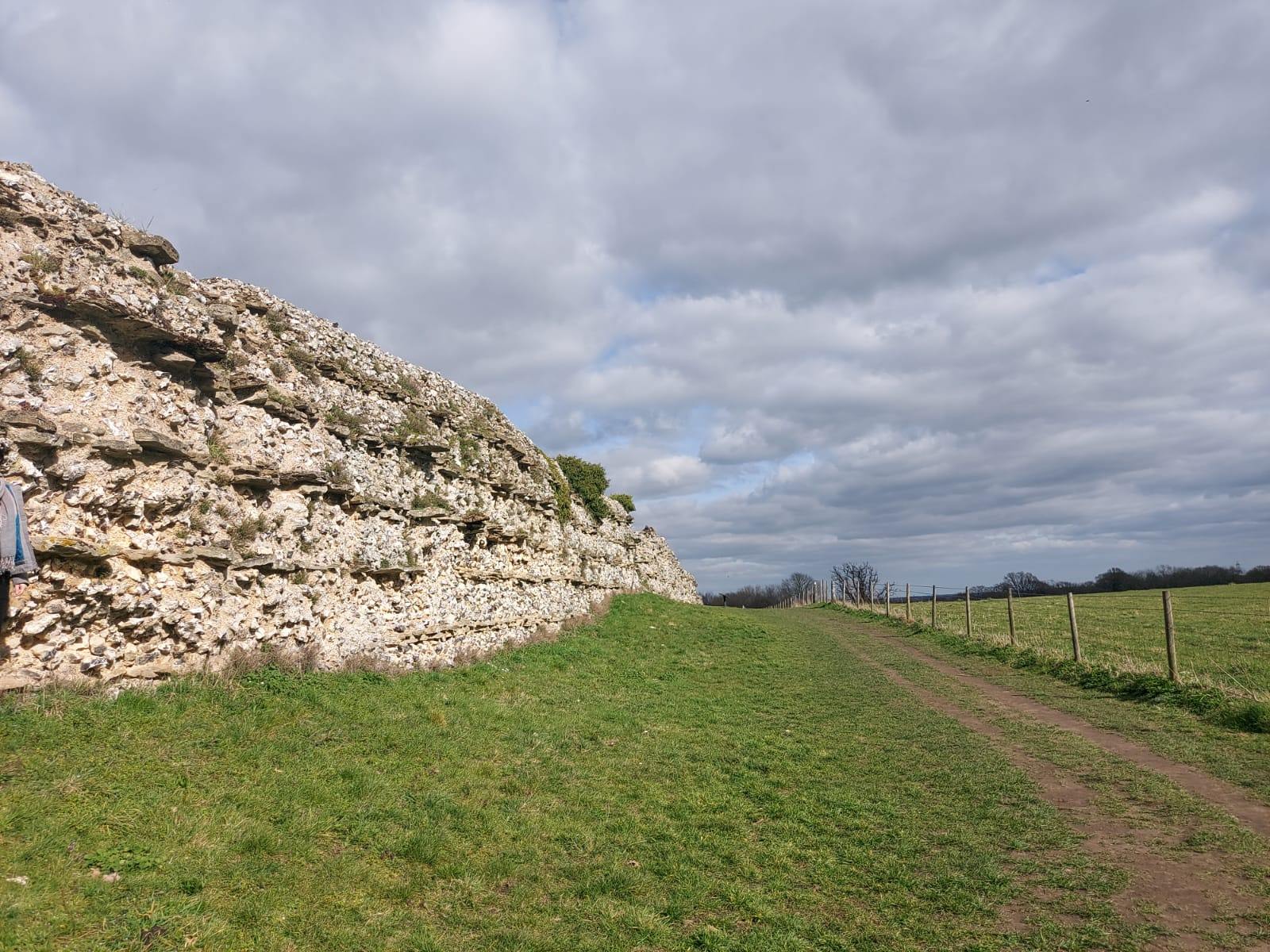
An example of a fortified Roman wall built at Calleva Atrebatum found near modern day Silchester

The purpose of the walls remain unclear. The towns would have needed a valid reason to convince the Emperor to allow them the resources and manpower to build because they were not simple projects. Emperors seemed concerned that if these towns were surprisingly overtaken by a peasant revolt that the fortifications could be used against the Romans.

Although the villas mentioned above may not have been heavily fortified there is archeological evidence to suggest a period of intense building to expand the infrastructure of villas around the Upper Province. For example, two villas on the outer ridge of the Cotswolds called Witcombe and Frocester Court were enlarged between 270-275 AD.

It is also thought that the Emperor Probus made sure to fortify coastal dwellings within the province. This was done in tandem with sea fortifications in Gaul to guarantee a safer hold on the Oceanus Britannicus (renamed to English channel).

== Londinium ==
Due to the lack of minted coins in Roman Britain during part of the Severan period (180–253 CE), it is hard for scholars to tell whether Upper Britain as a whole province was in a period of decline or not, even though there is much evidence towards a decline in Londinium. It is clearly known that there was at least enough money and resources to complete a new wall of Londinium during this period. The discovery of a coin containing the image of Commodus at a London site leads historians to believe that the wall was not completed no earlier than 190 CE, and perhaps as late as 220 CE. The new wall was 9 ft (2.7m) thick at ground level, including an 8 ft (2.4m)-thick plinth above.

The work was beyond local capability at the time which meant that the order to build it must have come from the top of the Roman Empire. The wall was either commissioned by Albinus or Severus. To tell which leader built the wall, both of their motivations have been studied by historians. City walls served as a main protector against enemies, but most towns in Britain did not receive much fortification until the late 2nd century. Archeology shows that the wall was not made in haste to combat any type of emergency at Londinium. Historians say this lack of haste could be proof that Albinus had the wall built foreseeing it would be wise to have a better fortified British capital when he withdrew most of his troops toward Rome to fight for the throne in the 190s.

Historians still ponder why Severus did not knock down Albinus' wall upon his arrival in Britain. The most prevalent theory states that because Severus was more concerned with the northern instability within Britain, he decided to keep the walls intact. This also leads researchers to believe Severus would not have planned a Londinium wall to be built before his arrival in the province because the capital was already a stable area.

Although this was a time of economic collapse, monumental sculptures which were made during this time have been unearthed too. 52 massive blocks of limestone built into the fourth-century riverside wall (the wall's extension), some with indented ornaments, were found in 1975; 45 of them in turn came from two extremely large monuments figures containing Hercules, Minerva, Mars and many other Roman deities.

Gatehouses were also built at Ludgate, Newgate, Bishopgate and Aldgate. These smaller walls and gatehouses were also completed in the middle of London's recession, when suburbs such as Walbrook and Southwark lay derelict.

== Governance ==
Under the peace restored by Caracella, both the Upper and Lower provinces began a system of governance that was both similar and distinct. Although the provinces were technically separated, two inscriptions from Geta Bridge and one from Cherterholm mention that the governor of Superior spoke of beneficiarri from his staff on duty in the Lower province. Scholars note that, for a time at least, Britain continued to be governed as a single entity. This means that consular governors like Geta Caesar and Ulpius Marcellus would have been the last two governors before the division. After that, it becomes unclear which specific governors oversaw the Upper Province. It is also unclear what type of general administrative changes happened after the division. The most current theory is that civil jurisdiction over the Lower Province was given to the commander of the Legion at York, but the consular Governor of the Southern Province took command over the entire country when needed.

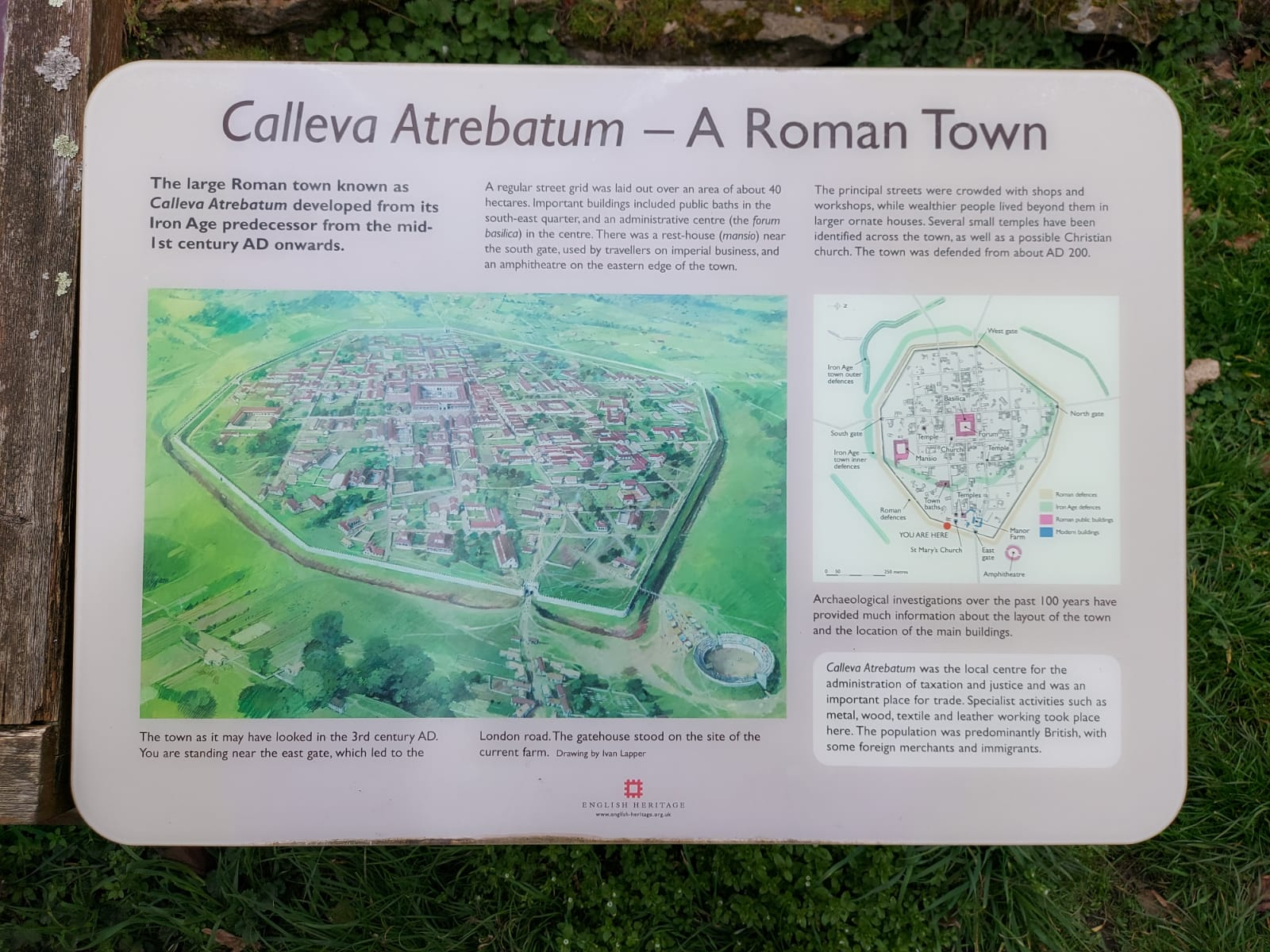
A plaque dedicated to Britannia Superior settlement Calleva Atrebatum

The Governors of Upper Britain were generally of consular rank, including the following:

- Tiberius Julius Pollienus Auspex, a man who may have governed Numidia c. 217-20. His time as governor of Superior may have occurred sometime during c. 223–226.
- Gaius Junius Faustinus Postumianus, a former statesman who had served on Severus' staff in Britain (probably sometime during 222–235).
- Rufinus. This may have been A. Triarius Rufinus, consul ordinarius in 210, or Q. Aradius Rufinus, a consul who likely served in the early 3rd century.
- Marcus Martiannius Pulcher (middle of the 3rd century).
- Titus Desticius Juba (253–255), noted for the rebuilding of Legio II Augusta's Caerleon barracks.

== The dissolution of Britannia Superior ==
The first rumblings of misfortune for Britannia Superior's prosperity occurred in 260 AD. The Roman Empire was having trouble with German invasions and briefly lost control over some of its provinces. Britannia, along with Germania, Gaul and Hispania adhered to an independent emperor. This territory was called "The Empire of the Gallic Provinces" or in Latin Imperium Galliarum. Relative peace in Upper Britain may have contributed to a sense of ease in the Gallic emperor because Britain brought much propaganda power.

The Roman Empire suffered during this period. After the murder of Gordian III in 244 CE and until Diocletian (284 CE) fifty-five different emperors declared themselves Caesar.

The importance of a strong Oceanus Britannicus (between Britannia and Gaul) reoccurs in 287 AD. Carausius, a senior Roman officer was suspected of collusion with pirates on the channel. To save himself from execution, he rebelled and took over the entirety of Britain. Protected by the sea, Carausius' reign was particularly hard to dislodge. In 293, he was murdered by his own finance minister Alectus, but only after he had already lost control over parts of Britain.

Alectus took control of Roman Britain in the autumn of 293; however his reign was short and uneventful. In September of 296, the new Emperor Constantius launched an invasion of Britain. With his colleague Asclepiodotus creating a diversion in the Channel, Carausius took advantage of mist to elude enemy fleets and landed near Southampton. Alectus was not a very strong strategic commander and he made an error of not instigating a naval battle. He was caught on his back foot by the invasion. Although Constantius had to return due to bad weather, Alectus was defeated at an inland battle near modern day Silchester. It was at this time that the new conqueror began the first revision of Roman Britain since Caracella. It seems likely that Britannia Superior and Inferior were instantly separated into smaller territorial units. Scholars think that Constantius first divided Upper Britain in two, giving Chester to a new province centered on London and chiseled out the eastern part of Superior from the southern part of Inferior. By the time of the Verona List (313–314 AD), the four new provinces of Roman Britain were Britannia Prima, B. Secunda, Maxima Caesariensis and Flavia Caesariensis.

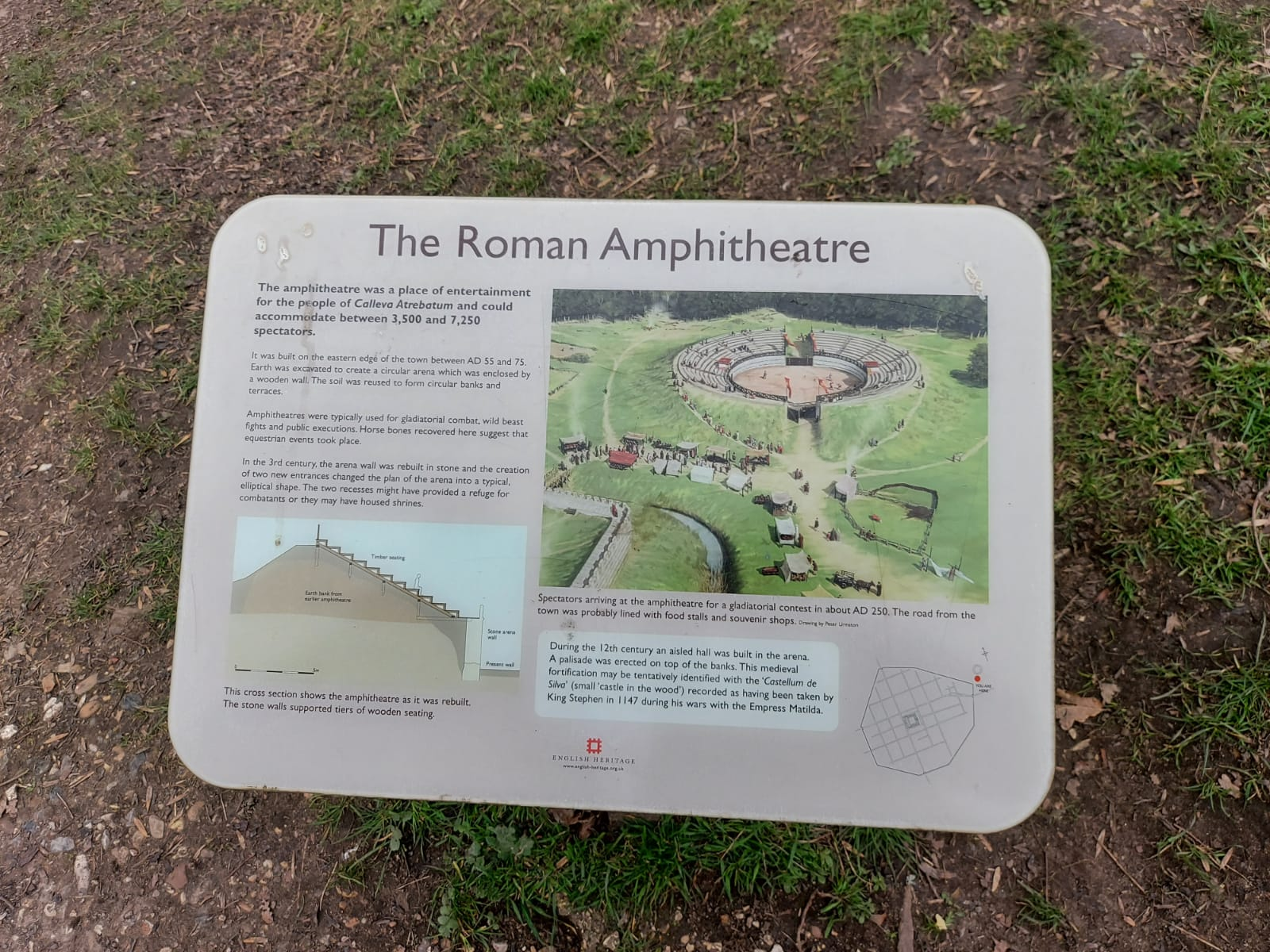
A plaque dedicated to the Roman amphitheater at Britannia Superior settlement, Calleva Atrebatum

== Historical significance ==
Near the end of the first century, Britannia Superior was the home to a changing supply of pottery and cultural practices. Observations on South East British settlements during this period show that efforts of globalization could be found in Roman Britain. In particular, researchers found that areas which fell within Britannia Superior proved that cultural hybridization could occur even within an elite ruling culture. This led researchers to a discovery that Romanization was not necessarily an elitist ideology which forced Britain to aspire to what was "Roman". Instead, Romano-British cultures changed in a way that falls outside the elitist paradigm. It is more likely that these two cultures hybridized themselves in a more progressive way of connectivity instead of a power structure of subjugation.

== Upper Britain's Seal ==
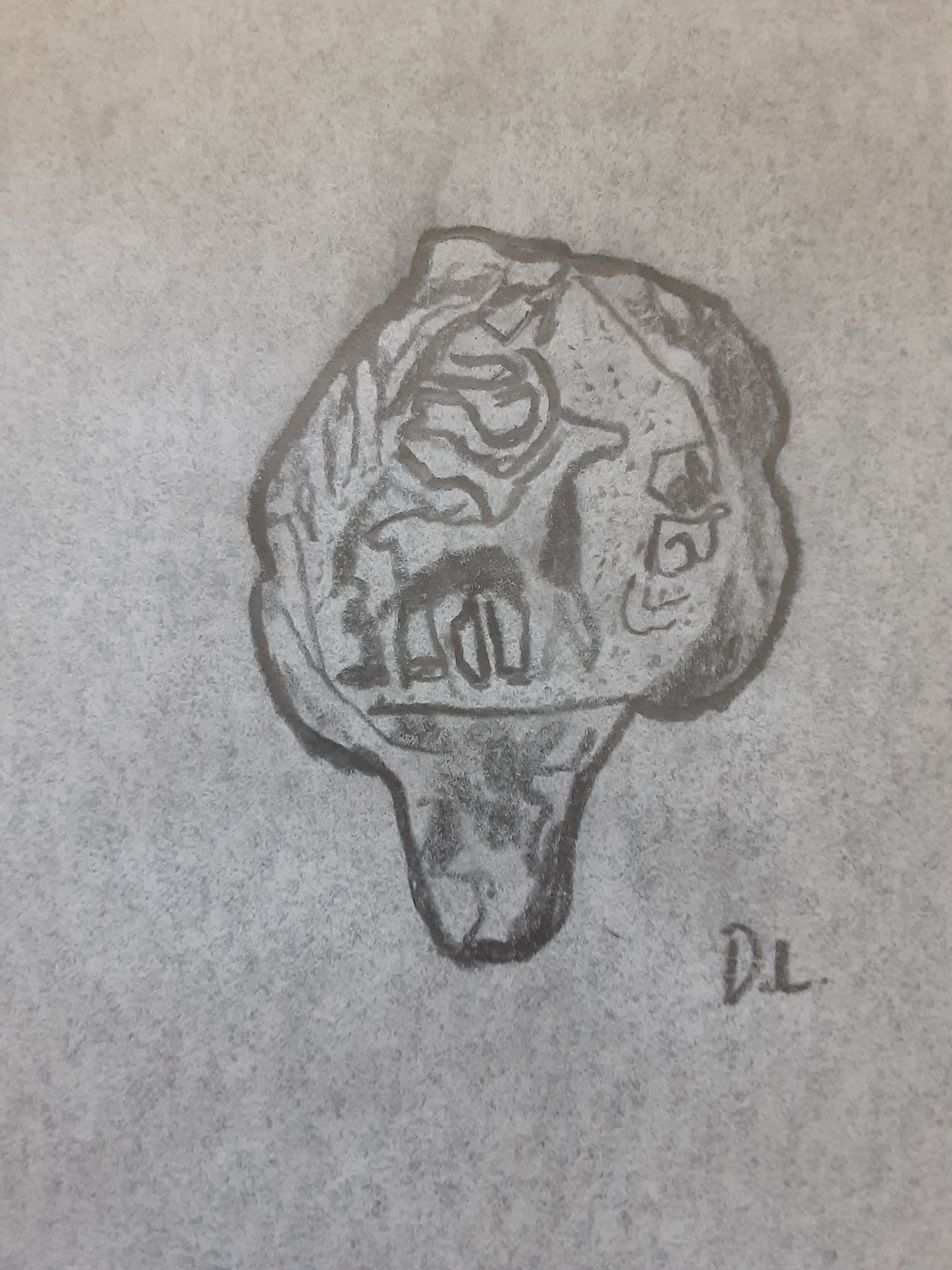
A drawing replicating an official lead Roman seal of Britannia Superior

According to a 1993 discovery at Burgh Castle, located in Norfolk, a leaded seal described itself as the "(Seal) of the Province of Upper Britain". Also on the seal is a stag facing right underneath the coverage of a tree. This has led historians to believe that the stag was thought of as an official animal of Upper Britain. Official seals coming from Lower Britain usually contained bulls.

== See also ==
- Britannia Inferior ("Lower Britain")
