= Carausian revolt =

Revolt by Roman naval commander, Carausius (286–296)

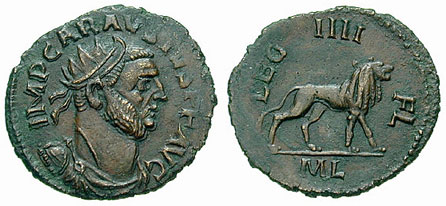
Coin of Carausius, minted in Londinium to pay soldiers of the Fourth Legion, c. 286-93

The Carausian revolt (AD 286–296) was an episode in Roman history during which a Roman naval commander, Carausius, declared himself emperor of Britain and northern Gaul. His Gallic territories were retaken by the western Caesar, Constantius Chlorus, in 293, after which Carausius was assassinated by his subordinate Allectus. Britain was regained by Constantius and his subordinate Asclepiodotus in 296.

== Revolt ==
Carausius, a Menapian of humble birth, rose through the ranks of the Roman military and was appointed to a naval command at Bononia (Boulogne), tasked with clearing the English Channel of Frankish and Saxon raiders. However, he was accused of collaborating with the pirates to enrich himself, and the western Augustus, Maximian, ordered that he be put to death. Carausius responded by declaring himself emperor in Britain. His forces comprised not only his fleet, augmented by new ships he had built, and the three legions stationed in Britain, but also a legion he had seized in Gaul, a number of foreign auxiliary units, a levy of Gaulish merchant ships, and barbarian mercenaries attracted by the prospect of booty.

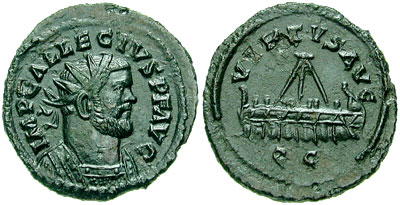
Coin of Allectus, c. 293-96

A panegyric delivered to Maximian in AD 288 or 289 refers to the emperor preparing an invasion to oust Carausius. A later panegyric to Constantius Chlorus says that this invasion failed due to bad weather, although Carausius claimed it as a military victory, and Eutropius says that hostilities were in vain thanks to Carausius's military skill, and peace was agreed.

== Britannic Empire ==
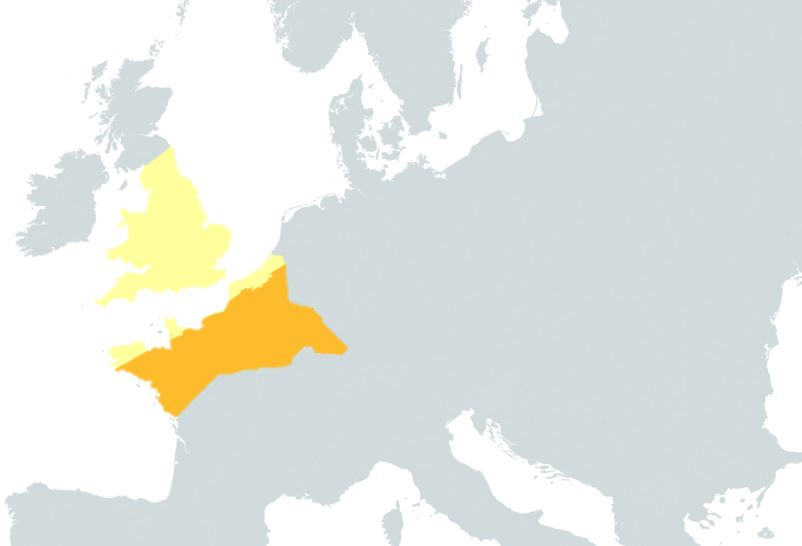
The Britannic Empire at its greatest extent: 🟧 Territories recaptured by the Roman Empire in 293, 🟨 Territories recaptured in 296

Having warded off a threat to his power, Carausius began to entertain visions of legitimacy and official recognition. He minted his own coins and aligned their value with Roman issues, while acknowledging and honouring Maximian and then Diocletian. This suggests he would have been willing to participate in a rapprochement if the others had agreed. He appears to have appealed to native British dissatisfaction with Roman rule: he issued coins with legends such as Restitutor Britanniae (Restorer of Britain) and Genius Britanniae (Spirit of Britain). Previously, Britain had been part of the Gallic Empire established by Postumus in 260, which had also included Gaul and Hispania and had only been restored by Aurelian in 274. A milestone from Carlisle bearing his name suggests that the whole of Roman Britain was in Carausius' grasp.

== Recovery of territories by the Roman Empire ==
In 293, Constantius Chlorus, now the western Caesar, isolated Carausius by retaking the territory he held in Gaul. Constantius next besieged the port of Bononia (now Boulogne-sur-Mer in northern France), building a mole across the harbour mouth to prevent the rebels from escaping by sea and to ensure they could not receive maritime aid. He also invaded Batavia in the Rhine delta, securing his rear against Carausius's Frankish allies. However, it was impossible to mount an invasion of Britain until a suitable fleet could be built.

Carausius, who had by this time led as "Imperium Britanniarum" for seven years, was assassinated in 293 by his subordinate and finance minister Allectus; Allectus then assumed command.

Coin of Constantius Chlorus

Three years later, in 296, the Roman reconquest of Britain began. With Maximian holding the Rhine frontier, Constantius divided his fleet into several divisions. He led one division himself from Bononia; another, sailing from Le Havre, was commanded by Asclepiodotus, prefect of the Praetorian Guard. Allectus stationed his fleet at the Isle of Wight, but fog allowed Asclepiodotus's ships to pass the defenders unseen. Asclepiodotus landed in the vicinity of Southampton and burned his ships. The rebels were forced to retreat from the coast but, in doing so, fell into the hands of another division and were routed. Allectus himself was killed in the battle, having removed all insignia in the hope that his body would not be identified. Archaeology suggests that Calleva Atrebatum (Silchester) was the site of his defeat. A group of Roman troops, who had been separated from the main body by the fog during the Channel crossing, caught up with the remnants of Allectus's men, mostly Franks, at Londinium (London) and massacred them.

Constantius himself, it seems, did not reach Britain until it was all over, and the panegyrist claims he was welcomed by the Britons as a liberator. At some point following the island's recovery by the Empire, the Diocletian reforms were introduced: Britain as a whole became the Diocese of the Britains under the administration of the Prefecture of the Gauls, based in Augusta Treverorum (Trier), and was divided from two provinces into four or five.

== Medieval British legend ==
Carausius, Allectus, Asclepiodotus and Constantius appear in Geoffrey of Monmouth's Historia Regum Britanniae (1136) in distorted guise as rulers of Britain. Here, Carausius is a native Briton who persuades the Romans to give him a naval command and uses it to overthrow the king of Britain, Bassianus, or Caracalla. The Romans send Allectus with three legions to remove him, but Allectus proves an oppressive ruler, and Asclepiodotus, here a duke of Cornwall, leads a popular uprising to depose him. He defeats Allectus near London and besieges his last legion in the city. The Romans surrender on the condition that they are allowed safe passage out of Britain, which Asclepiodotus grants, but his allies, the Venedoti, behead them and throw their heads into the river Gallobroc. Ten years later Asclepiodotus is deposed by Coel, duke of Colchester, for his part in the persecution of Christians under Diocletian. The Romans send Constantius to negotiate with him. Coel agrees to pay tribute to Rome and gives Constantius his daughter Helena in marriage, and upon his death Constantius becomes the new king of Britain.
