= Vicarius =

Latin word meaning substitute or deputy

Within the administrative structure of the Roman Empire, an imperial vicar (from Latin: vicarius, meaning deputy) or exarch (from Ancient Greek: ἔξαρχος / exarchos) was a high ranking state official who served as a regional governor, and the office also continued to exist in the early Byzantine Empire. Since the time of emperor Diocletian (284-305), imperial vicars were appointed as civilian governors of newly established imperial dioceses, each of them encompassing several provinces. In the eastern parts of Roman Empire, dominated by the Greek language and common use of Greek terminology, imperial vicars were called exarchs.

In English terminology, forms vicarius or vicar are used for these officials.

== History ==
Originally, in ancient Rome, this office was equivalent to the later English "vice-" (as in "deputy"), used as part of the title of various officials. Each vicarius was assigned to a specific superior official, after whom his full title was generally completed by a genitive (e.g. vicarius praetoris). At a low level of society, the slave of a slave, possibly hired out to raise money to buy manumission, was a servus vicarius.

Later, in the 290s, Emperor Diocletian carried out a series of administrative reforms, ushering in the period of the Dominate. These reforms also saw the number of Roman provinces increased, and the creation of a new administrative level, the diocese. The dioceses, initially twelve, grouped several provinces, each with its own governor. The dioceses were headed by a vicarius, or, more properly, by a vices agens praefecti praetorio ("deputy of the praetorian prefect"). An exception was the Diocese of the East, which was headed by a comes ("count"). In 370 or 381, Egypt and Cyrenaica were detached from the Diocese of the East and made a diocese under an official called the Augustal Prefect.

According to the Notitia dignitatum (an early 5th century imperial chancery document), the vicarius had the rank of vir spectabilis; the staff of a vicarius, his officium, was rather similar to a gubernatorial officium. For example, in the diocese of Hispania, the staff of the vicarius included:

- The princeps (i.e. chief of staff) was chosen from among the senior agentes in rebus (couriers or special investigators, 'men of affairs,' from the ministry of the interior headed by the master of the offices), from the salaried class of the ducenarii (those earning 200,000 sesterces a year—the highest regular pay grade in the Roman civil service; the highest officials, governors and above, were not civil service).
- A cornicularius ("chief of staff").
- Two numerarii (chief accountants).
- A commentariensis ("keeper of the commentary", the official diary).
- An adiutor (adjutant; literally "helper", an assistant).
- An ab actis ("acts-keeper", archivist).
- A cura epistolarum ("curator of correspondence").
- An unnamed number of subadiuvae ("deputy assistants").
- Various exceptores (lower clerks).
- Singulares et reliquum officium (various menial staff).
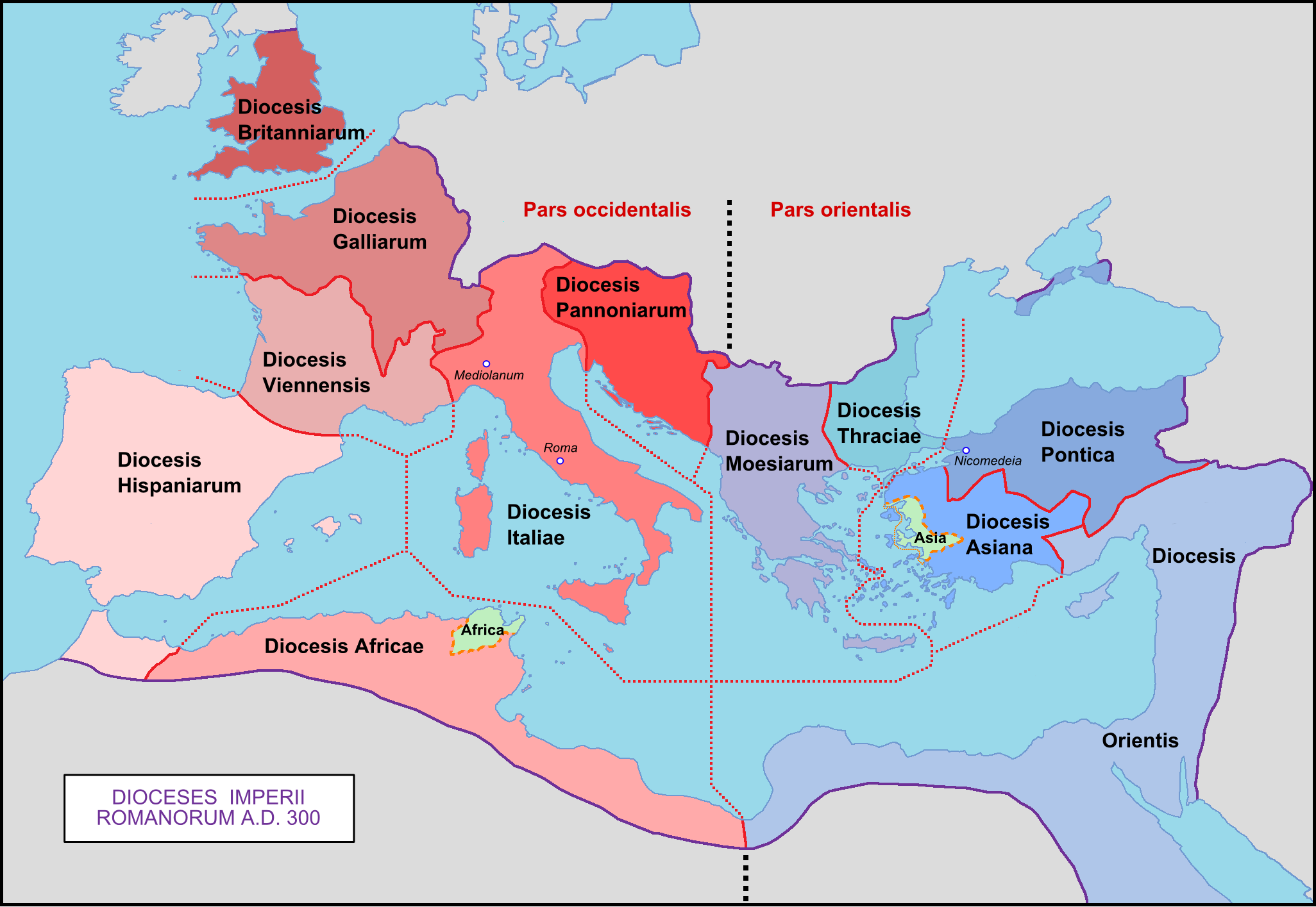
Original dioceses of the Roman Empire, created by emperor Diocletian (284–305)

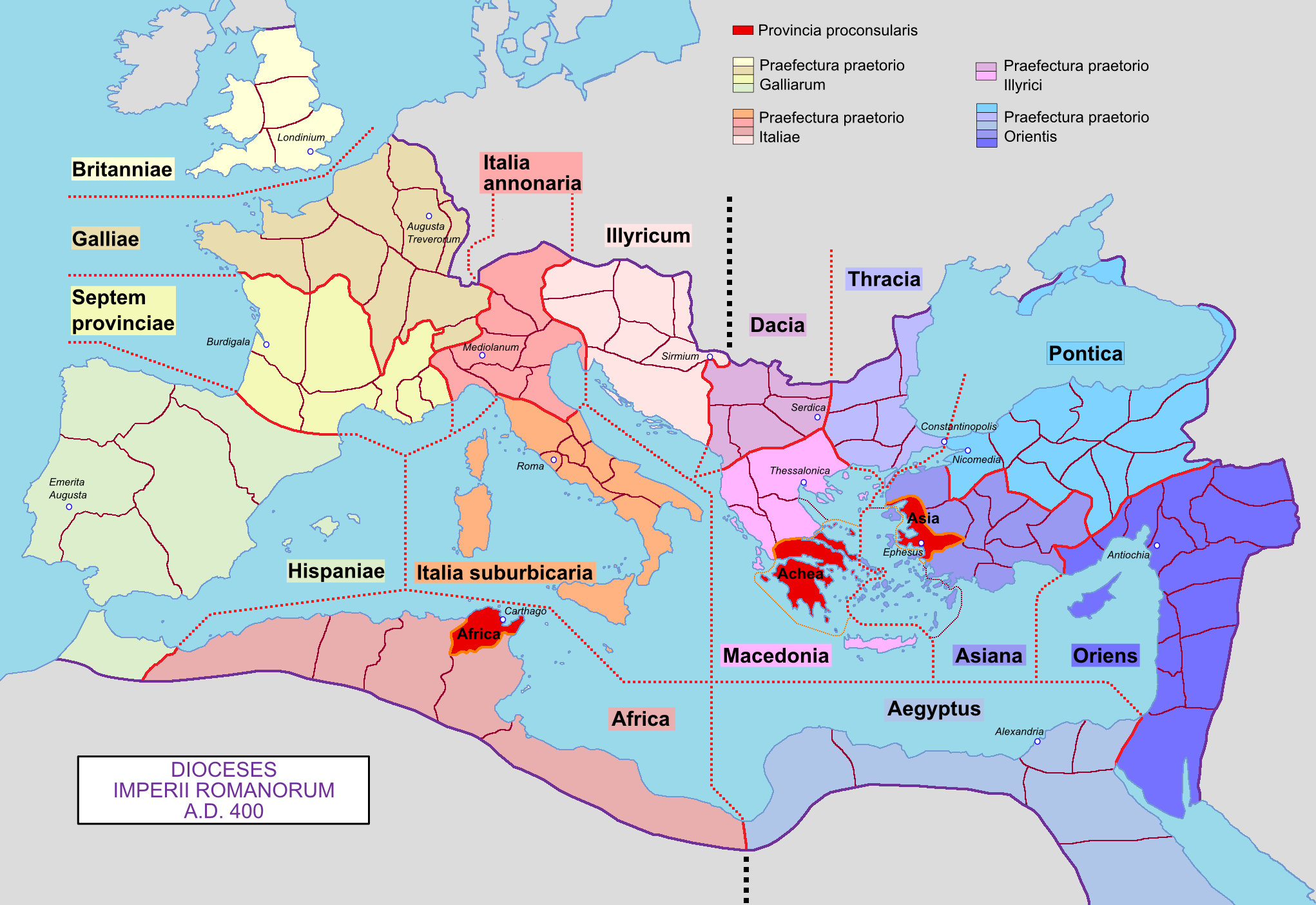
Later dioceses of the Roman Empire, around 400 AD

== See also ==
- Governor (Roman Empire)
- Praetorian prefect
- Proconsul
- Corrector (Roman empire)
- Praeses
- Magister militum

== Sources ==
- Barnes, Timothy D. (1982). The New Empire of Diocletian and Constantine. Cambridge, MS: Harvard University Press.
- Cases, Laurent J. (2019). "Language and Administrative Structures: The "Vicarii" under Diocletian and Constantine (297-315)". Historia: Zeitschrift für Alte Geschichte. 68 (3): 353–367.
- Meyendorff, John (1989). Imperial unity and Christian divisions: The Church 450-680 A.D. Crestwood, NY: St. Vladimir's Seminary Press. ISBN 9780881410563.
- Mirković, Miroslava B. (2017). Sirmium: Its History from the First Century AD to 582 AD. Novi Sad: Center for Historical Research.
- Ostrogorsky, George (1956). History of the Byzantine State. Oxford: Basil Blackwell.
- Karl Schneider, "Vicarius". In: Paulys Real-Encyclopädie der Classischen Altertumswissenschaft, vol. VIII A,2 (Stuttgart 1958), col. 2015-2053.
- Várady, László (1969). Das Letzte Jahrhundert Pannoniens (376–476). Amsterdam: Verlag Adolf M. Hakkert.
- Wickham, Chris (1981). Early Medieval Italy: Central Power and Local Society, 400-1000. Totowa, NJ: Barnes & Noble.
- Wozniak, Frank E. (1981). "East Rome, Ravenna and Western Illyricum: 454-536 A.D." Historia: Zeitschrift für Alte Geschichte. 30 (3): 351–382.
