= Festus (historian) =

4th-century Roman historian

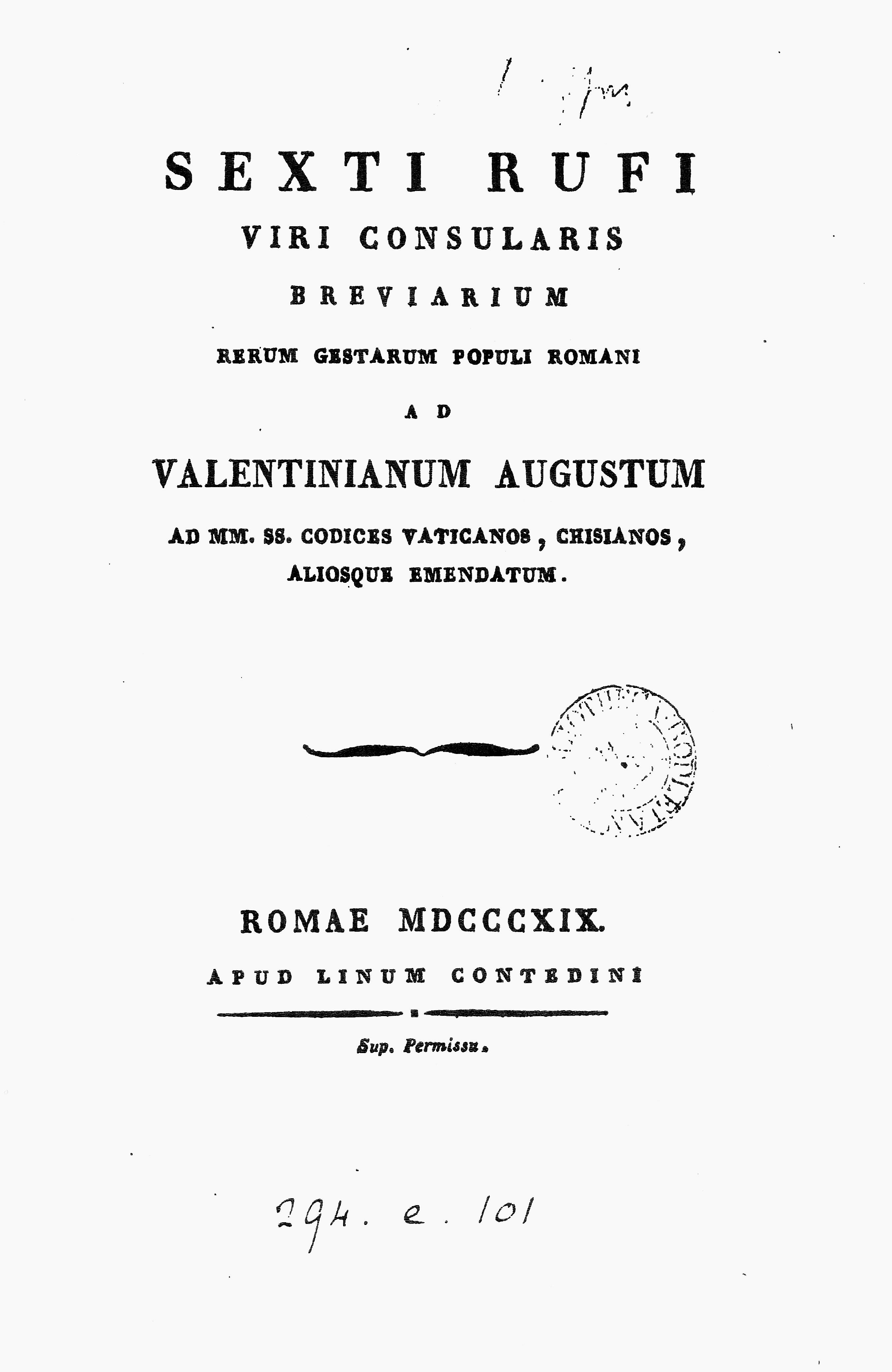
Title Page of Festus' Breviarium (Rome, 1819)

Festus (died 3 January 380) was a Late Roman historian. His name appears in some manuscripts as Rufius Festus, Rufus Festus, Sextus Rufus or Sextus Festus, but they appear to be corruptions. He is mainly known as the author of an epitome titled Breviarium rerum gestarum populi Romani ("Summary of the accomplishments of the Romans"), written around AD 370 and commissioned by the Eastern emperor Valens in preparation for his war against Persia. The Breviarium covers the entire history of the Roman state from the foundation of the city. The book consists of 30 chapters treating Roman events in a terse overview, mainly focused on military and political conflicts. It is estimated to be a work of very low quality.

He is often identified with Festus of Tridentum, magister memoriae (secretary) to Valens and notoriously severe proconsul of Asia, where he was sent to punish those implicated in the conspiracy of Theodorus. The work itself is divided into two parts, one geographical and other historical. Festus appears to have used the following sources:

- The Breviarium historiae Romanae of Eutropius, newly compiled by order of the same emperor
- The Epitome rerum Romanarum (until the reign of Augustus) by Florus
- The epitome of Livy, a lost work based on Ab urbe condita
- A history of the Roman emperors, perhaps the Enmannsche Kaisergeschichte

== Sources ==
- Ammianus Marcellinus, Res Gestae 29.2.22.
- Eunapius, Vitae sophistarum 7.6.6-13.
- Suda s.v. Φῆστος.
- Zosimus, Historia Nova 4.15.2-3.
