= Deruvian =

Saint Deruvian
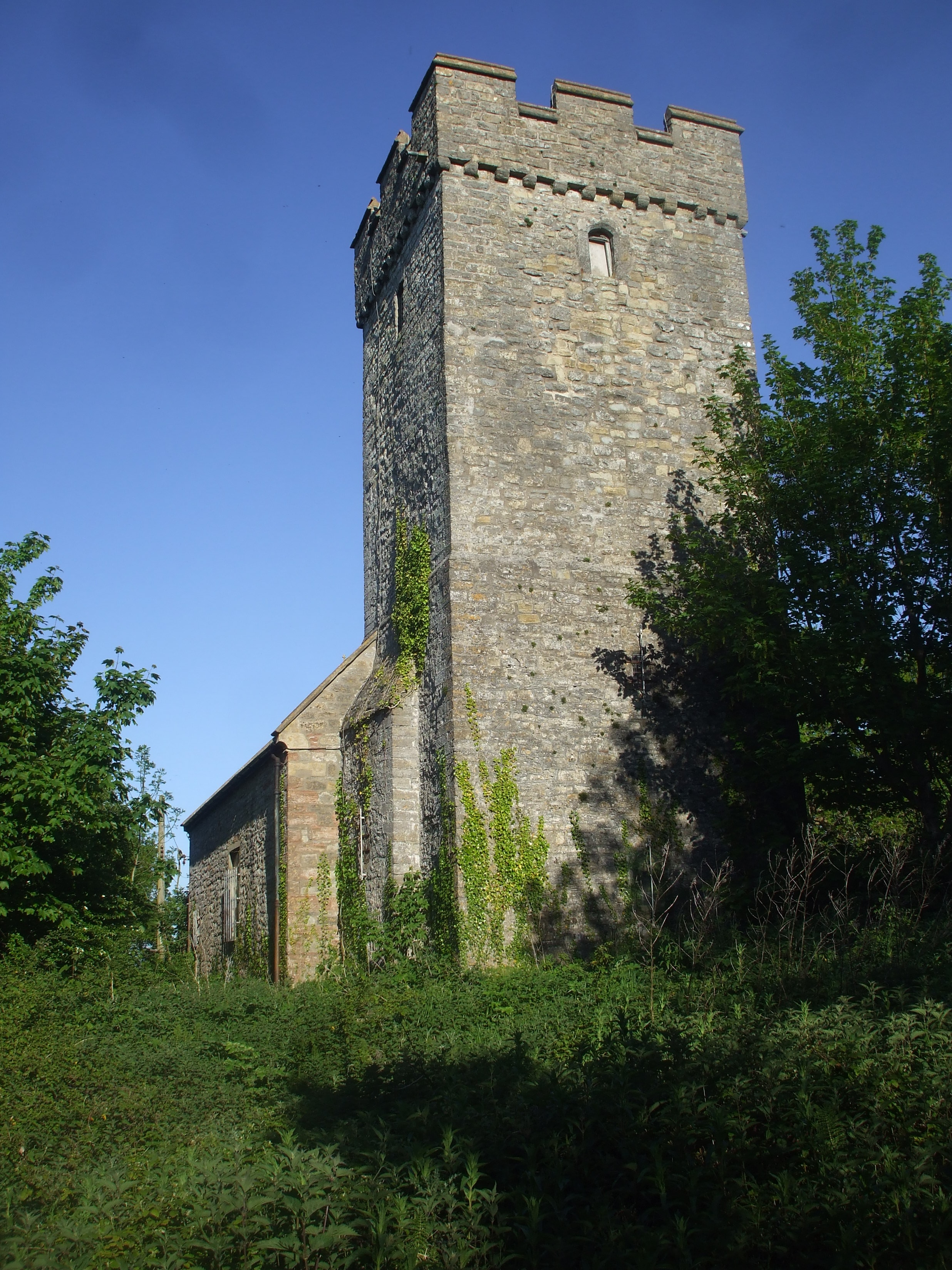
- SS Dyfan & Teilo's in Merthyr Dyfan

Bishop & "Martyr"
- Canonized: Pre-Congregation
- Feast: Usually unobserved
- Patronage: Merthyr Dyfan (mistakenly); Llanddyfnan (mistakenly)
- Controversy: Historicity; confusion with St Dyfan

Deruvian (Medieval Latin: Deruvianus), also known by several other names including Damian, was a possibly legendary 2nd-century bishop and saint, said to have been sent by the pope to answer King Lucius's request for baptism and conversion to Christianity. Together with his companion St Fagan, he was sometimes reckoned as the apostle of Britain. King Lucius's letter (in most accounts, to Pope Eleutherius) may represent earlier traditions but does not appear in surviving sources before the 6th century; the names of the bishops sent to him does not appear in sources older than the early 12th century, when their story was used to support the independence of the bishops of St Davids in Wales and the antiquity of the Glastonbury Abbey in England. The story became widely known following its appearance in Geoffrey of Monmouth's History of the Kings of Britain. This was influential for centuries and its account of SS Fagan and Deruvian was used during the English Reformation to support the claims of both the Catholics and Protestants. Christianity was well-established in Roman Britain by the third century. Some scholars therefore argue the stories preserve a more modest account of the conversion of a Romano-British chieftain, possibly by Roman emissaries by these names.

Probably mistakenly, Deruvian's story has been given to the obscure St Dyfan thought to have been the namesake of Merthyr Dyfan and Llanddyfnan. His feast day does not appear in any medieval Welsh calendar of the saints and is not presently observed by the Anglican, Catholic, or Orthodox churches in Wales.

== Name ==
Deruvian's name is also cited as "Duvian" (Duvianus) or "Dwywan" and, owing to scribal error, also appears in modern saints' lists as "Damian" (Damianus). Bishop Ussher lists numerous other variants and misspellings, although Deruvian's identification with St Dyfan, the presumed namesake of Merthyr Dyfan in Wales, seems to have been introduced by the widely discredited antiquarian Iolo Morganwg and is generally disregarded.

== Sources ==
The legendary accounts of King Lucius of Britain's baptism during the late-2nd-century pontificate of Eleutherius are documented at least as far back as the "Felician Catalog", an early 6th-century edition of The Book of Popes which added more details to the terser entries of earlier recensions. In the 8th century, Bede mentioned that Lucius's "pious request" of baptism had been granted; the 9th-century History of the Britons connected with Nennius further states that Lucius had been baptized together "with all the chiefs of the British people" and "in consequence of a legation sent by the Roman emperors and pope Evaristus". The 'third edition' of The Deeds of the Kings of the English composed by William of Malmesbury around 1140 baldly states that "the rust of antiquity may have obliterated their names".

The monks' names seem to have first appeared in William's own chronicle of the abbey at Glastonbury, initially composed sometime between 1129 and 1139. This was soon followed by The History of the Kings of Britain, the pseudohistorical work completed by Geoffrey of Monmouth around 1136, which included many more details. Geoffrey claimed his additions derived from a treatise by Gildas on Aurelius Ambrosius but this work (if it ever existed) has been lost. Around 1203, Gerald of Wales's composed his work On Invectives, which claims to preserve verbatim a letter to Pope Honorius II from the convent of St David's. The letter seems to date from the 1120s. (Note: Gerald actively employed the story of King Lucius in defense of the antiquity and status of St David's but several factors point to the letter's composition under Bishop Bernard, including the local clerics' identification with the Normans and description of themselves as a convent instead of a chapter.)

The story was subsequently repeated and embellished elsewhere. These accounts generally provided no earlier authorities for their claims, however, prior to the collection of the Iolo Manuscripts by Edward Williams. Among other changes, Williams identified William's Deruvian as the St Dyfan who seems to have been an early martyr in southeastern Wales. Williams's alteration and apparent forging of other works means his accounts and claims are usually disbelieved. Further, the discrepancy in William of Malmesbury's two accounts of Lucius mentioned above has prompted scholars such as Robinson to believe that the missionaries' appearance in the Glastonbury chronicles were not part of the original work; instead, they account it a pious fraud perpetuated as part of Glastonbury's medieval feud with Westminster over the order of their foundation.

== Legend ==
According to the 12th-century historian, William of Malmesbury, "Deruvian" was sent to Wales as a companion of the missionary "Phagan" in the mid-2nd century by Pope Eleutherius. Shortly after, Geoffrey of Monmouth's pseudohistorical History of the Kings of Britain also described "Duvian" as the companion of "Fagan", providing many additional but suspect details.

== Life ==
Baring-Gould, Rees and Mullins are widely dismissive of the legends surrounding Lucius but offer that Deruvian and his companion may have been genuine local saints whose names were preserved in the area around Llandaff and then—as else nothing remained known of them—were mixed up with the separate stories surrounding Lucius Bartrum, however, notes the lack of earlier sources and posits that one must suppose such dedications followed the popularization of Geoffrey's story.

== Legacy ==
Following the Iolo Manuscripts, St Deruvian is now often conflated with the supposed St Dyfan presumably martyred at Merthyr Dyfan, although Baring-Gould notes that his name in the earliest known sources could never have been understood or developed as Dyfan at any time. The church at Merthyr Dyfan seems to have been dedicated to St Teilo since its foundation, but is now dedicated jointly to SS Dyfan and Teilo. As late as 2010, the local parish continued to claim to be the oldest Christian settlement in Wales on the basis of the legends about King Lucius.

There is a church at Llandyfan ("St Dyfan's") outside Ammanford in Wales, although there is no large community there. It was notable for its importance in the early Welsh Nonconformist movement. Roberts notes the similarity with Dyfnan, son of the invading Irishman Brychan of Brycheiniog, and finds it unlikely to have been associated with a Dyfan, "because the place was always called Llandyfân with the accent on the last syllable", appearing in earlier records as Llanduvaen. (Note: History of the Parish of Llandybie, cited and translated by Norman.) There was a holy well nearby esteemed for treatment of paralysis and related illnesses, known as Ffynnon Gwyddfaen or Gwyddfân. (Note: Catholic Llandeilo, cited by Norman.) The church may have been a late erection by its owners, "the Dynevor family", as a chapel of ease for the pilgrims there.

John Stow's Annals of England also lists a (since discontinued) parish church dedicated to "Saint Deruuian" among those in the deanery of Dunster in Somersetshire.

Prior to the Dissolution of the Monasteries, his relics were claimed by Glastonbury Abbey.

The festival of St Deruvian does not appear in any surviving medieval Welsh calendar of the saints, but Cressy later listed it on 8 April. (Note: Willis gives Deruvian's festival as 13 July, but Baring-Gould notes this as a confusion with St Doewan.) He and St Fagan took on renewed importance during the English Reformation: at his martyrdom in 1604, the Blessed John Sugar asked his Protestant accusers who had evangelized the country; receiving no answer, he listed Eleutherius, "Damianus", and "Fugatius" as evidence for the early date of British Catholicism. Protestants, meanwhile, used the story as evidence of the separate national church. Challoner claims Deruvian was celebrated together with St Fagan at medieval Glastonbury on 3 January. Other sources note his celebration with St Fagan on 24 May or (again with Fagan) on the festival of Pope St Eleutherius on 26 May. This last date—the traditional day of the baptism of King Lucius—is sometimes given as an observance of the Eastern Orthodox diocese of Thyateira and Great Britain. In fact St Deruvian's Day (under any of his aliases) is currently unobserved by any of the major denominations of Wales.
