= Dyfan (disambiguation) =

Saint Dyfan was an obscure Welsh martyr and saint.

Dyfan may also refer to:

- Saint Deruvian, who is often mistakenly conflated with St Dyfan
- Merthyr Dyfan (Welsh for "martyrium of Dyfan"), a community and parish in southeastern Wales
- Dyfan, an electoral ward in the south Wales town of Barry
- Dyfan, Bishop of Bangor in northern Wales
