= Lady chapel =

Separate chapel dedicated to the Virgin Mary within a greater church

A Lady chapel or lady chapel is a chapel dedicated to Mary, mother of Jesus, particularly one inside a cathedral or other large church. The chapels are also known as a Mary chapel or a Marian chapel, and they are traditionally the largest side chapel of a cathedral, placed eastward from the high altar and forming a projection from the main building, as in Winchester Cathedral. Most Roman Catholic, as well as some Evangelical-Lutheran and Anglican cathedrals still have such chapels, while mid-sized churches have smaller side-altars dedicated to the Virgin.

The occurrence of lady chapels varies by location and exist in most of the French cathedrals and churches where they form part of the chevet. In Belgium they were not introduced before the 14th century; in some cases they are of the same size as the other chapels of the chevet, but in others (probably rebuilt at a later period) they became much more important features. Some of the best examples can be found in churches of the Renaissance period in Italy and Spain.

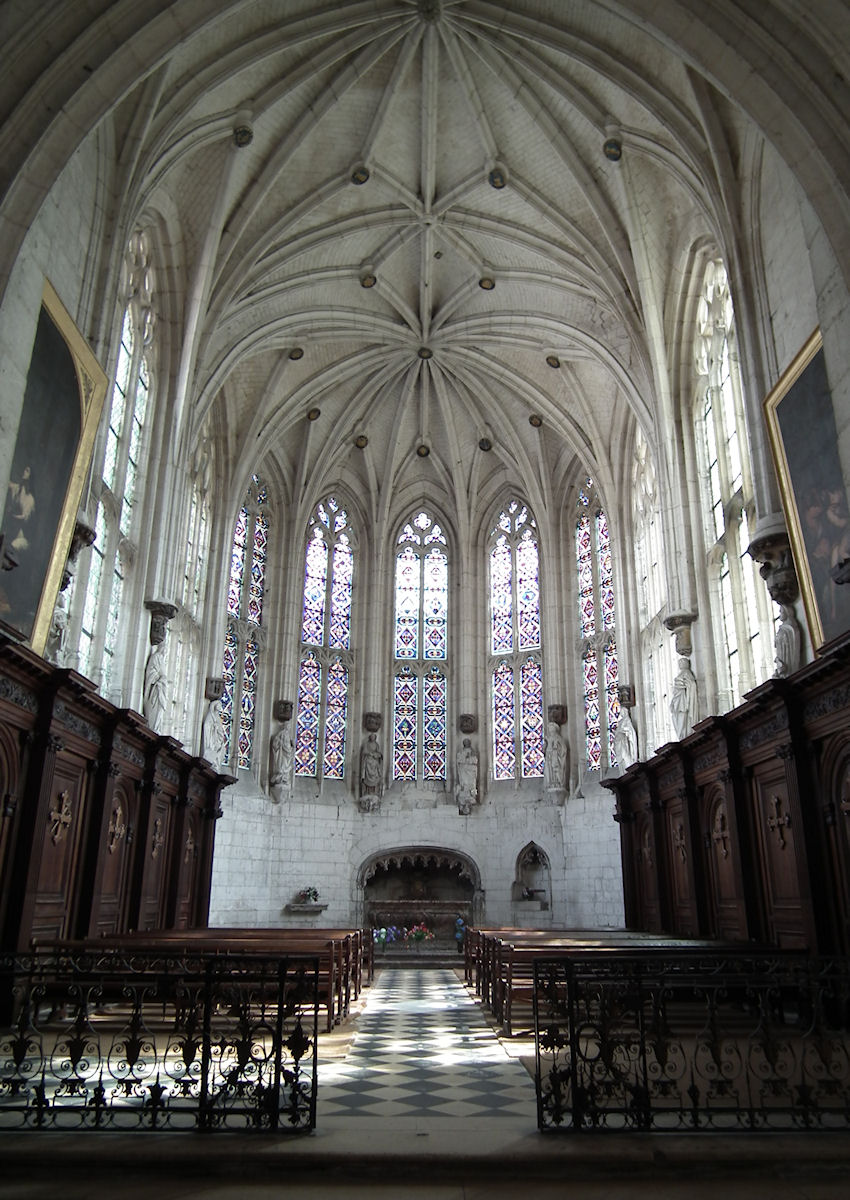
Saint-Riquier Abbey, France

It was in lady chapels, toward the close of the Middle Ages, that innovations in church music were allowed, only the strict chant being heard in the choir.

In late Old English, the word lady belonged to a declension of feminine nouns which were uninflected for the singular possessive, and the name lady chapel is a fossilized vestige. It is properly understood as '(Our) Lady's Chapel'.

== In England ==
In the 12th century, legends surrounding King Lucius of Britain, the apostles Fagan and Duvian described them as having erected the Lady Chapel at Glastonbury Abbey as the oldest church in Britain; the accounts are now held to have been pious forgeries. The earliest English lady chapel of certain historicity was that in the Saxon cathedral of Canterbury; this was transferred during the rebuilding by Archbishop Lanfranc to the west end of the nave, and again shifted in 1450 to the chapel on the east side of the north transept. The lady chapel of Ely Cathedral is a distinct building attached to the north transept, which was built before 1016. At Rochester the current lady chapel is west of the south transept (which was the original lady chapel, and to which the current chapel was an extension).

Probably the largest lady chapel was built by Henry III in 1220 in Westminster Abbey. This chapel was 30 feet (9.1 m) wide, much in excess of any foreign example, and extended to the end of the site now occupied by Henry VII's Lady Chapel. Also in 1220, the office of Warden of the Lady Chapel was established, with the responsibility for the Lady altar, and its sacred vessels, candles and other accoutrements. The Lady Chapel at Lichfield Cathedral, funded by Bishop Walter de Langton, 1315-1336, has architectural affinities with Sainte-Chapelle in Paris.

Among other notable English examples of lady chapels are those at the parish church at Ottery St Mary, Thetford Priory, Bury St Edmunds Cathedral, Wimborne Minster and Highfield Church in Hampshire. The Lady Chapel was built over the chancel in Compton, Guildford, Surrey; Compton Martin, Somersetshire; and Darenth, Kent. At Croyland Abbey there were two lady chapels. The Priory Church at Little Dunmow was the lady chapel of an Augustinian priory, and is now the parish church. The Lady Chapel in Liverpool Cathedral is another, more recent, example. Consecrated in June 1910, it was designed by George Gilbert Scott and is noteworthy for its size and beauty.

Salisbury and Truro cathedrals have an eastern chapel that is equivalent to a lady chapel but with a different name, as a result of the whole church being dedicated to Mary.

== Places ==
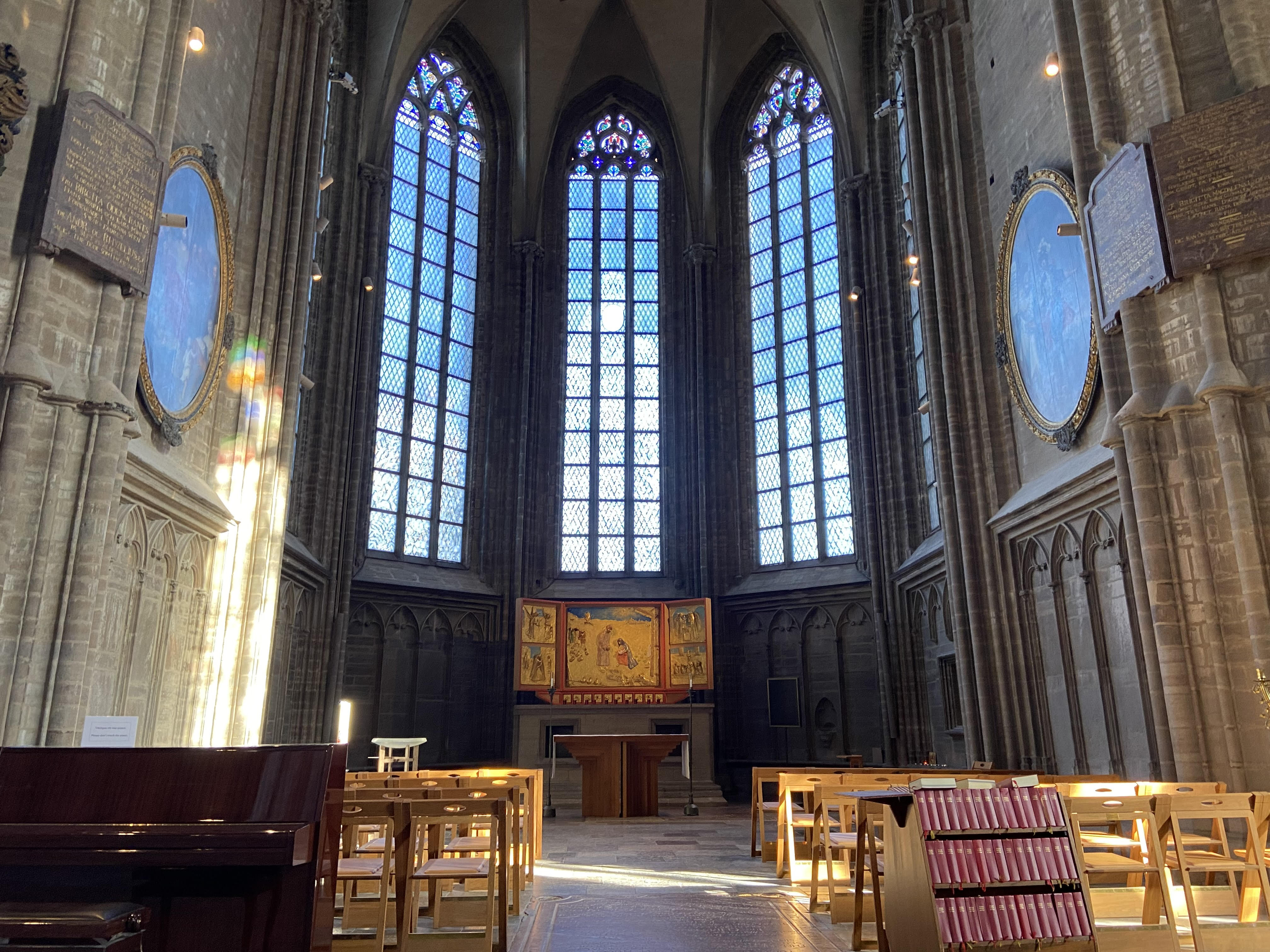
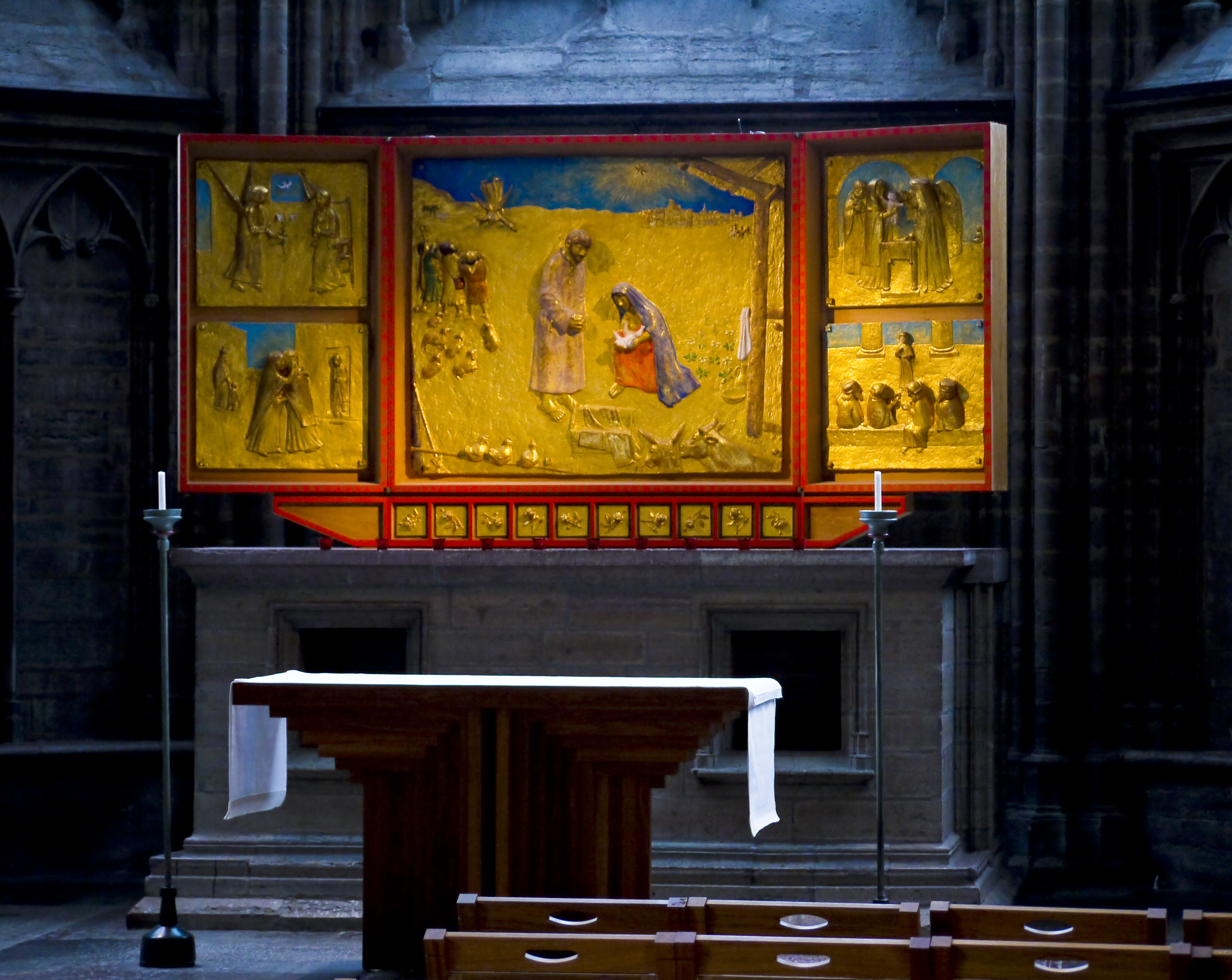
The Lady chapel of Evangelical-Lutheran Linköping Cathedral, with its 1987 altarpiece containing scenes from the life of the Blessed Virgin Mary, including the Annunciation to the Blessed Virgin Mary, the Visitation of the Blessed Virgin Mary, and the Purification of the Virgin. On the predella are ten roses cast in bronze, which refer to the Hail Mary and the rosary.

=== Canada ===
- The Lady Chapel at the Cathedral Church of the Redeemer in Calgary, Alberta
- The Lady Chapel at Christ Church Cathedral in Victoria, British Columbia

=== Ireland ===
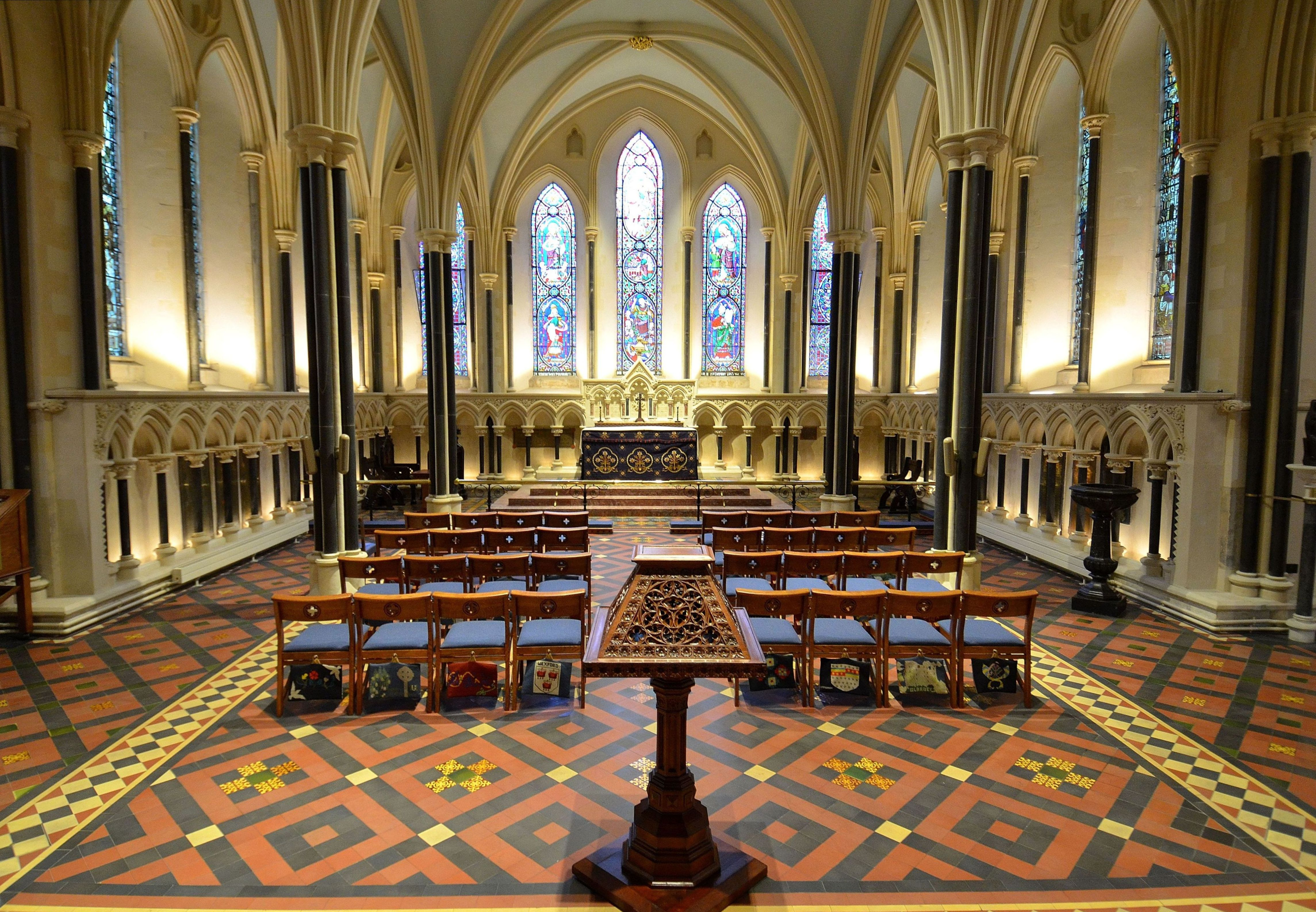
Lady chapel of St Patrick's Cathedral, Dublin

- The Lady Chapel of St Patrick's Cathedral in Dublin
- The Lady Chapel of Christ Church Cathedral in Dublin

=== New Zealand ===
- The Lady Chapel at St Paul's Cathedral in Wellington

=== Russia ===
- The Lady Chapel at Catholic Church of St. Catherine in Saint Petersburg

=== South Africa ===
- The Lady Chapel of St Cyprian's Cathedral in Kimberley

=== Sweden ===
- The Lady Chapel of Uppsala Cathedral, which includes a statue of the Virgin Mary installed in 2005
- The Lady Chapel of Strängnäs Cathedral, which includes a medieval statue of the Blessed Virgin Mary made from an oak tree
- The Lady Chapel of Gustaf Vasa Church, at which the Holy Mass is offered on Sunday at 6 pm, Tuesday at 8 am, and Wednesday at 12 noon
- The Lady Chapel of Skellefteå County Parish Church, at which the Mass is celebrated every Wednesday at 6 pm
- The Lady Chapel of Norrtälje Church
The Lady Chapel of Vadstena Abbey Church (Evangelical-Lutheran) in Vättern, Sweden

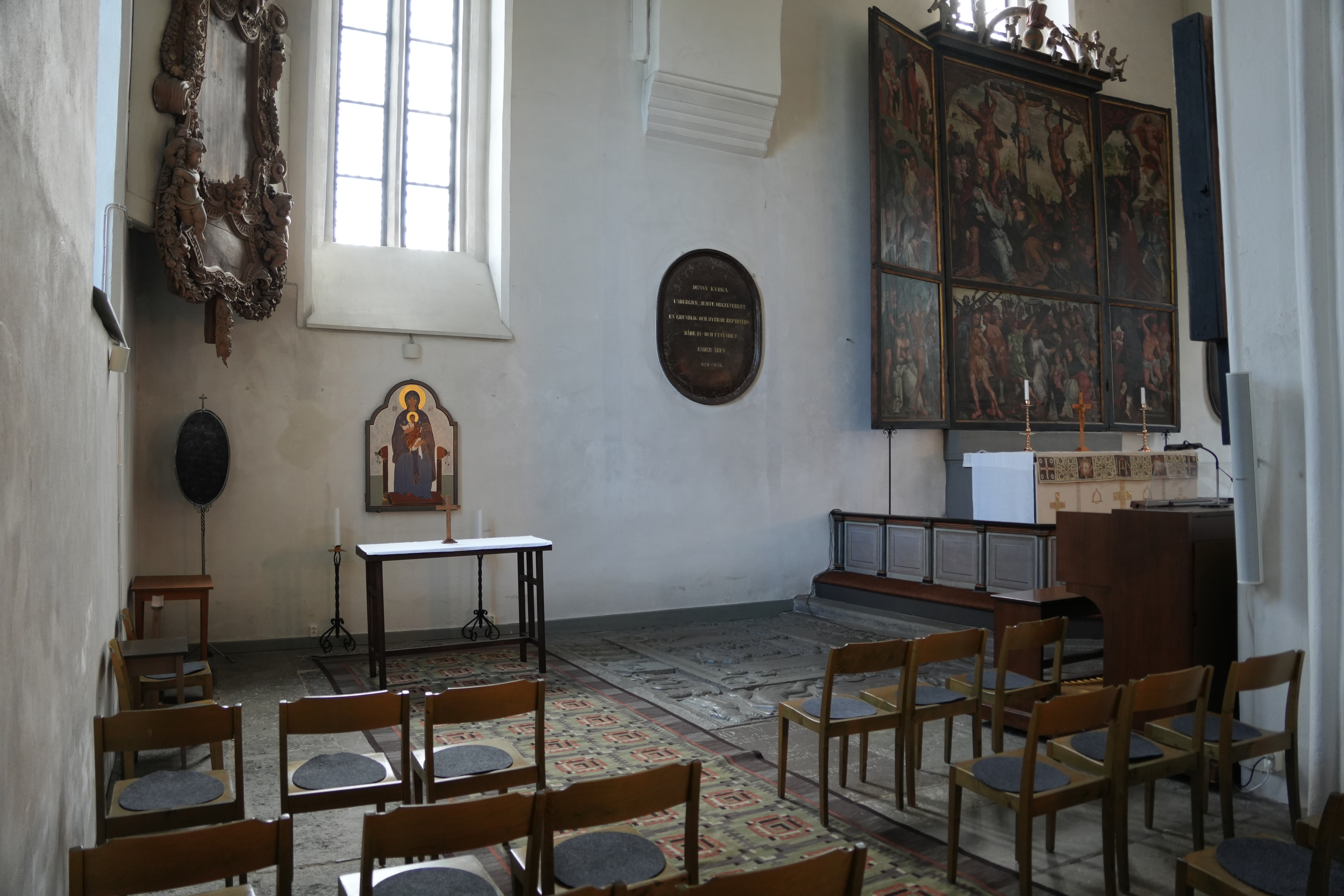
The Marian Chapel in the Church of Our Lady (Evangelical-Lutheran) in Skänninge, Sweden

=== United Kingdom ===
- The Lady Chapel at Glastonbury Abbey, formerly supposed to be the oldest church in Britain
- The Lady Chapel at Canterbury Cathedral, the probable first Lady chapel in Britain
- The Elder Lady Chapel at Bristol Cathedral in England
- The Eastern Lady Chapel at Bristol Cathedral in England
- The Lady Chapel at Chester Cathedral in England
- The Lady Chapel at Chichester Cathedral in England
- The Lady Chapel at Ely Cathedral in England
- The Lady Chapel at Gloucester Cathedral in England
- The Lady Chapel at Lichfield Cathedral in England
- The Lady Chapel at Hereford Cathedral in England
- The Lady Chapel at Liverpool Cathedral (Anglican) in England
- The Lady Chapel at Liverpool Metropolitan Cathedral (Catholic) in England
- The Lady Chapel at Manchester Cathedral in England
- The Lady Chapel at Rochester Cathedral in England
- The Lady Chapel at Wells Cathedral in England
- The Lady Chapel at Westminster Abbey (Anglican), also known as the "Henry VII Chapel"
- The Lady Chapel of Westminster Cathedral (RC) in England
- The Lady Chapel of Winchester Cathedral in England
- The Lady Chapel at St Alban's in Southampton, England
- The Lady Chapel at All Saints' in London, England
- The Lady Chapel at St Augustine's in Birmingham, England
- The Lady Chapel at Christ the King's in London, England
- The Lady Chapel at Holy Cross in Crediton, England
- The Lady Chapel at Holy Cross in Waltham Abbey, England
- The Lady Chapel at St Clare's in Liverpool, England
- The Lady Chapel at St David's in Pantasaph, Wales
- The Lady Chapel at St Jude's-on-the-Hill in London, England
- The Lady Chapel at St George's in Birmingham, England
- The Lady Chapel at St Helen's in Ashby-de-la-Zouch, England
- The Lady Chapel at St James the Great's in Haydock, England
- The Lady Chapel at St John the Baptist's in Chester, England
- The Lady Chapel at St Mary's in Stamford, England
- The Lady Chapel at St Mary's in Widnes, England
- The Lady Chapel at St Mary Magdalen's in Woolwich, England
- The Lady Chapel at St Mary Magdalen's in Yarm, England
- The Lady Chapel at St Mary the Virgin's in Stanton Drew, England
- The Lady Chapel at St Matthew's in Oxhey Village, England
- The Lady Chapel at St Matthew's in Westminster, England
- The Lady Chapel at St Michael's in St Michael Caerhays, Cornwall
- The Lady Chapel at St Michael's in Tilehurst, England
- The Lady Chapel of St Pancras's in Ipswich, England
- The Lady Chapel at St Peter's in Berkhamsted, England
- The Lady Chapel at St Peter's in Sudbury, England
- The Lady Chapel at Holy Trinity in Trowbridge, England
- The Lady Chapel at Windsor Castle, now formally the "Albert Memorial Chapel"
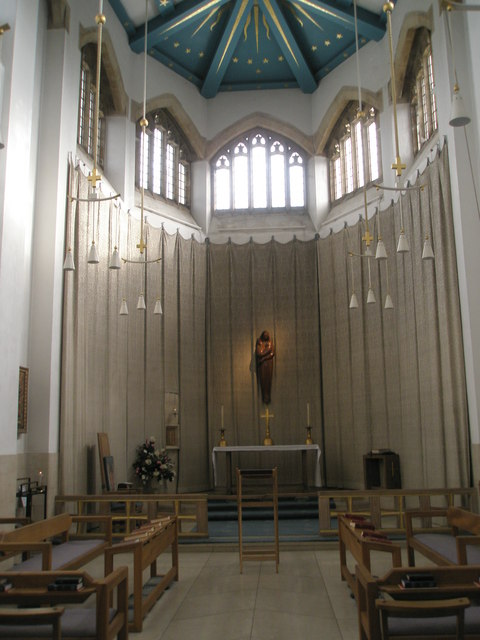
Lady chapel of Guildford Cathedral, UK

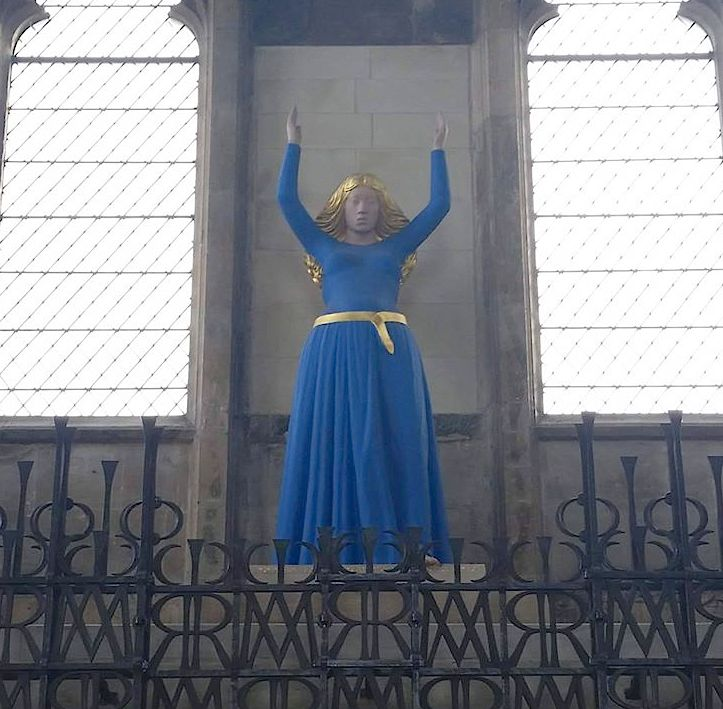
Lady Chapel, Ely Cathedral, UK. Virgin Mary statue by David Wynne

Lady chapel of the Basilica of St. Lawrence, Asheville

=== United States ===
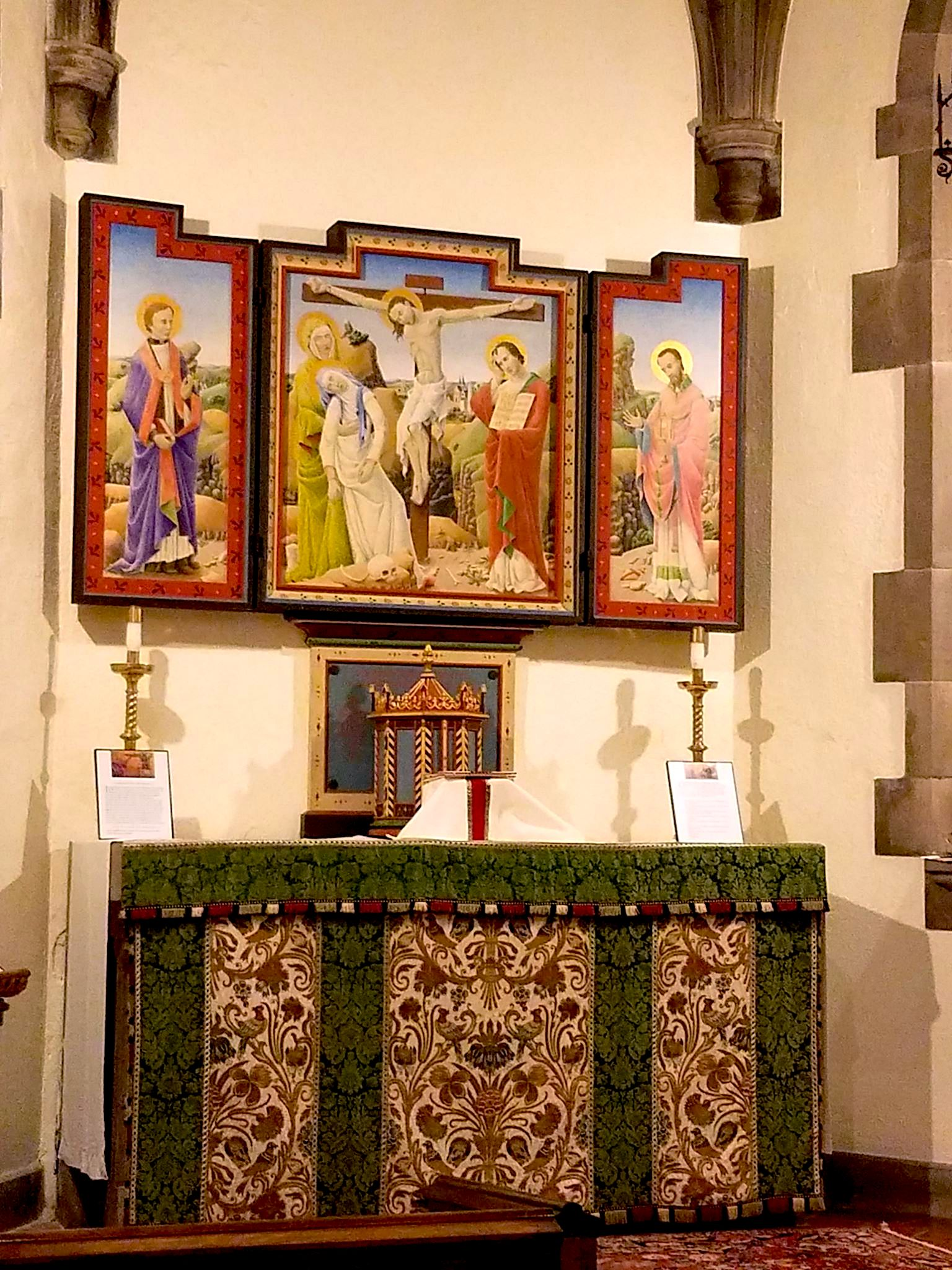
Lady Chapel, Church of the Good Shepherd (Rosemont, Pennsylvania) (Episcopal)

- The Lady Chapel at Manhattanville College in Purchase, New York
- The Lady Chapel at St. Mark's Church, Rittenhouse Square in Philadelphia, Pennsylvania
- The Lady Chapel at Church of the Good Shepherd (Rosemont, Pennsylvania)
- The Lady Chapel at the Basilica of the Sacred Heart, Notre Dame, Indiana
- The Lady Chapel at the Church of the Advent, Boston, Massachusetts
- The Lady Chapel at St. Patrick's Cathedral, (Manhattan).

== See also ==
- Roman Catholic Marian churches
- Evangelical-Lutheran Mariology
- St. Mary's Church (disambiguation), for independent churches dedicated to the Virgin Mary
- The Lady Chapel, a 1994 novel by Candace Robb
