= Fagan (saint) =

Welsh saint

Saint Fagan
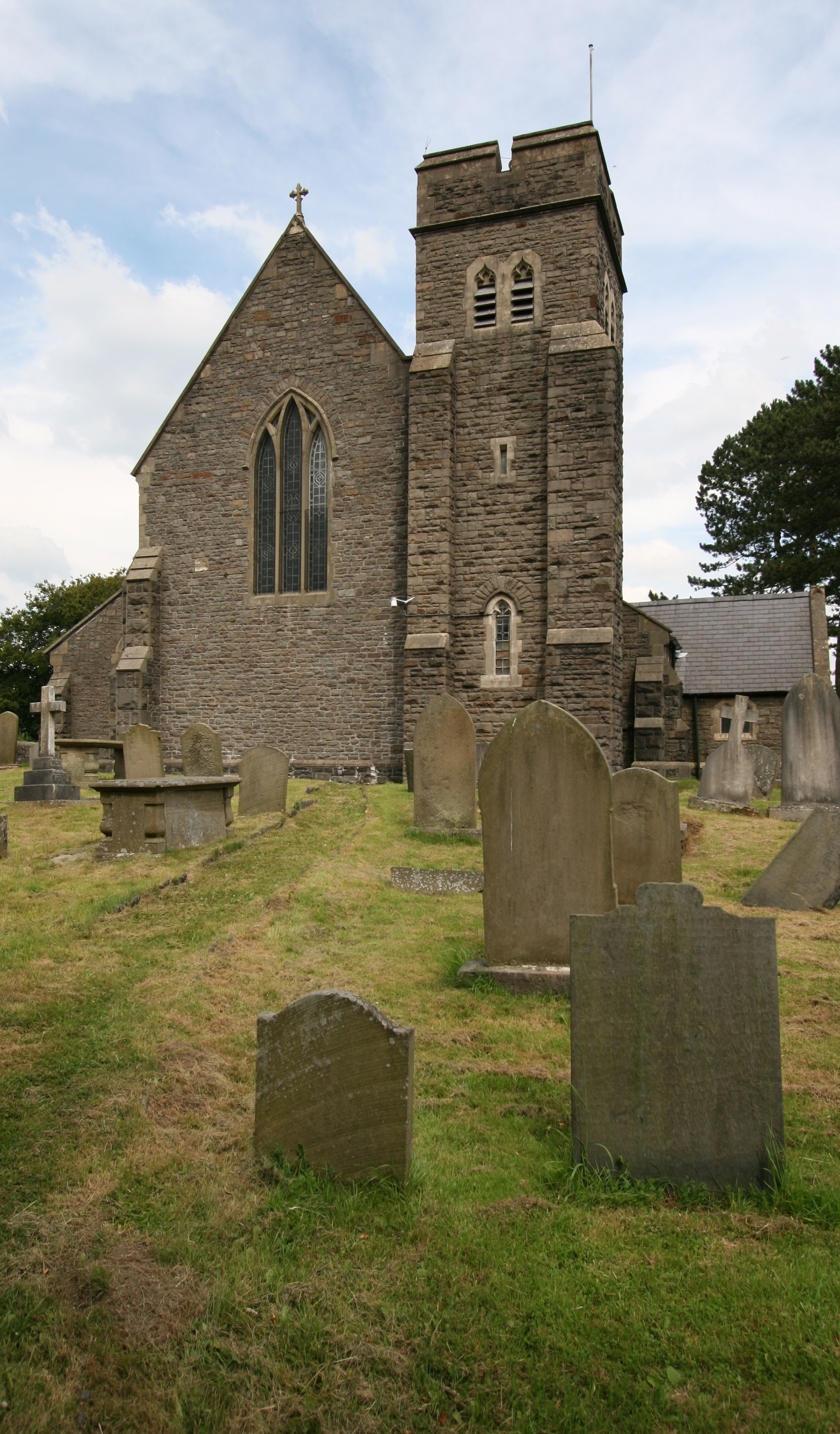
- St Fagan's Church in Trecynon

Bishop & Confessor
- Died: c. 2nd century
- Canonized: Pre-Congregation
- Feast: Usually unobserved
- Patronage: Trecynon; St Fagans (lapsed); Llanmaes (lapsed)

Fagan (Latin: Faganus; Welsh: Ffagan), also known by other names including Fugatius, was a legendary 2nd-century Welsh bishop and saint, said to have been sent by the pope to answer King Lucius's request for baptism and conversion to Christianity. Together with his companion St Deruvian, he was sometimes reckoned as the apostle of Britain.

King Lucius's letter (in most accounts, to Pope Eleutherius) may represent earlier traditions but does not appear in surviving sources before the 6th century; the names of the bishops sent to him does not appear in sources older than the early 12th century, when their story was used to support the independence of the bishops of St Davids in Wales and the antiquity of the abbey at Glastonbury in England. The story became widely known following its appearance in Geoffrey of Monmouth's pseudohistorical History of the Kings of Britain. This was influential for centuries and its account of SS Fagan and Deruvian were used during the English Reformation to support the claims of both the Catholics and Protestants. Geoffrey's account is now considered wholly implausible, but Christianity was well-established in Roman Britain by the third century. Some scholars therefore argue the stories preserve a more modest account of the conversion of a Romano-British chieftain, possibly by Roman emissaries by these names.

Fagan is the patron saint of a number of churches, and gives his name to the village St Fagans near Cardiff, now the home of a Welsh National History Museum. His feast day does not appear in any medieval Welsh calendar of the saints and is not observed by the Anglican, Catholic, or Orthodox churches in Wales.

== Name ==
St Fagan's name appears as "Phagan" (Medieval Latin: Phaganus) in William of Malmesbury's work On the Antiquity of the Glastonbury Church, written between 1129 and 1139. It is given as "Fagan" (Faganus) in Geoffrey of Monmouth's pseudo-historical History of the Kings of Britain, written around 1136 and sometimes supposed to have been the source of the name's later insertion into William's account. The name has been variously connected with Latin paganus ("rural, pagan"), French faguin ("faggoter, wood gatherer"), and Old English fagin ("joyful"). Wade-Evans proposed that the name was a confusion with the Italo-British rhetorician Bachan or Pachan who appears in the life of Saint Cadoc.

The entry on Pope Eleutherius in Petrus de Natalibus's late 14th-century collection of saints' lives gives Fagan's name as "Fugatius", an emendation subsequently copied by Platina and many others. These names were further misspelled in later sources in a variety of ways.

== Sources ==
The story of Pope Eleutherius's late-2nd-century mission to the apocryphal King Lucius of Britain (Welsh: Lles ap Coel) dates to at least the 6th-century recension of The Book of Popes known as the "Felician Catalog" but the names of the missionaries themselves don't seem to have appeared before the 12th century. They aren't given by Bede's 8th-century Ecclesiastical History of the English People or by the 9th-century History of the Britons traditionally credited to Nennius. William of Malmesbury's 'third edition' of the Deeds of the Kings of the English (c. 1140) records of the priests sent to Lucius that "the rust of antiquity may have obliterated their names".

However, the work On the Antiquity of the Glastonbury Church, initially written by William between 1129 and 1139, and Geoffrey of Monmouth's History of the Kings of Britain both include the names of Fagan and his companion. A contemporaneous or even earlier source is the letter of the convent of St David's to Pope Honorius II preserved in Gerald of Wales's c. 1203 Book of Invectives which appears to date from the 1120s. (Note: Gerald actively employed the story of King Lucius in defense of the antiquity and status of St David's but several factors point to the letter's composition under Bishop Bernard, including the local clerics' identification with the Normans and description of themselves as a convent instead of a chapter.) Geoffrey claimed to have derived his own account from a 6th-century treatise by St Gildas on "the victory of Aurelius Ambrosius"; given the content of his story, the claim is generally discounted. After these, the story began to be broadly repeated. Further details appeared in the Iolo Manuscripts collected by Edward Williams, although his many alterations and forgeries render their historicity suspect.

The discrepancy in William's accounts led Robinson to conclude that the appearance of the missionaries' names in the earlier book was a spurious addition by the abbey's scribes, of a piece with the passages in the present text that include a patently fraudulent "Charter of St Patrick", that describe Abbot Henry of Blois (d. 1171) as "of blessed memory", and that mention a fire which occurred at the abbey in 1184. Robinson and Bartrum proceed to treat Fagan as an invention of Geoffrey subsequently taken up by others. Baring-Gould, Rees, and Mullins modify this somewhat: while admitting misinformation in the account of Geoffrey, they suggest that the names of Fagan and his companions were probably genuine but that—in the absence of more detailed surviving records—they had been taken up and added to the legendary accounts of King Lucius.

== Legend ==
Accounts of St Fagan and his companion Deruvian joined a long-standing narrative concerning King Lucius of Britain and his conversion to Christianity around the time of the Roman Emperors Antoninus Pius and Marcus Aurelius, a time of general tolerance towards the religion. St Gildas had described the first apostles as arriving during the reign of the emperor Tiberius. William of Malmesbury's cautious account in the Deeds of the Kings of the English allows that St Philip may have reached the island but quickly leaves such "vain imaginations" in favor of praising the ancient wattle chapel of St Mary erected by Pope Eleutherius's nameless missionaries, which he called "the oldest I am acquainted with in England". (The precise antiquity of the church was part of a bitter dispute over seniority between the abbey and Westminster over the primacy of their foundations.)

The current text of On the Antiquity of the Glastonbury Church is rather more florid: Philip is not said to have come himself but to have sent Joseph of Arimathea in precisely AD 63. His initial community died out and the area left to "wild beasts" but "Phagan" and Deruvian found it miraculously preserved, merely reviving its community in AD 166, directed by the Archangel Gabriel and joining their names to the Acts of the Apostles. They were said to have provided pilgrims with 40 years of indulgences, a wildly anachronistic detail, but one quite profitable for the abbey.

The accounts in Geoffrey and Gerald make no special mention of Glastonbury. Instead, Gerald's letter from the clerics at St David's says that Fagan and "Duvian" were the first apostles of all Britain, baptising its king Lucius and then converting all his subjects after their arrival in 140. It says 27 pagan leaders were replaced by the same number of bishops and 3 archbishops placed over them, including one at St Davids. It advances these points in favor of its independence from Canterbury, a particular project of Bishop Bernard (r. 1115–c. 1147). Geoffrey also treats Fagan and "Duvian" as the first apostles to Britain, noting their conversion of Lucius's petty kings and success at "almost" removing paganism from the whole island until the Great Persecution under Diocletian. He states that the pagan temples were remade into churches and 28 "flamens" and 3 "archflamens" were replaced by 28 bishops under the 3 archbishops of London (over Loegria and Cornwall), York (over Deira and Albania), and Caerleon (over Wales). Fagan and "Duvian" were then said to have personally returned to Rome for confirmation of their work, returning again with still more clerics. This all supposedly occurred before the death of Lucius in 156. Gerald elsewhere concedes that the archbishop was initially at Caerleon but claims it was eventually moved to Menevia (St Davids). He states the early archbishops administered twelve suffragans each and each oversaw one of the five Roman provinces of Britain: Britannia Prima (Wales), Britannia Secunda (Kent), Valentia (Scotland), Flavia (Mercia), and Maxima (York). He further concedes, however, his knowledge of the time was mostly based on "common report" and not certain history.

The Book of Llandaff composed around 1125 names neither emissary from Rome but gives "Elvan" (Elvanus) and Medwin (Medwinus) as the names of Lucius's messengers bearing his letter to the pope. The two accounts were later combined, so that Elfan and "Medwy" are sent off and honored in Rome and then return with Fagan and Deruvian. Fagan and Dyfan were also sometimes credited with the initial establishment at Congresbury, which was removed in 721 to Tydenton (present-day Wells).

In the Iolo Manuscripts, Fagan was called an Italian who came to Britain as a bishop and enthroned himself at "Llansantffagan". A separate manuscript credits him with the foundation of the churches at "Llanffagan Fawr" (present-day St Fagans near Cardiff) and at "Llanffagan Fach" (present-day Llanmaes near Llantwit Major). Their parish churches are now dedicated to Saint Mary and Saint Cadoc, respectively. A third manuscript conflates Deruvian with Dyfan—wrongly, in Bartrum's estimation. "Dyfan" is then made the first bishop of Llandaff and the martyr at Merthyr Dyfan. Fagan is then made his successor at Llandaff. (Baring-Gould refers to the pair as chorepiscopi.) A fourth lists the following triplet among the "Sayings of the Wise":

Didst thou hear the saying of Fagan
when he had produced his argument?
'Where God is silent, it is wise not to speak.' (Note: Given by Baring-Gould in Welsh as Lle taw Duw nid doeth yngan.)

== Life ==
Arguing in favor of a partial historicity to these figures, Rees noted that all but Elfan had long-standing associations with parish churches in the area around Llandaff, though he admitted none seemed as grand or preëminent as one might expect were they actually the apostles of Britain. Bartrum replied such dedications must be assumed to post-date Geoffrey's popularity.

== Legacy ==
St Fagans, a village near Cardiff in Wales, continues to bear his name, although following the Norman invasion of Wales a new parish church was erected east of the old chapel and dedicated to St Mary the Blessed Virgin in 1180. (This is now a Grade II* listed building.) The 16th-century antiquarian John Leland recorded in his travel notebooks that a nearby chapel remained dedicated to Fagan and was sometimes also used as the parish church, but this was in ruins by the time of the English Civil War a century later. St Fagan's Well was nearby and considered particularly restorative for "the falling sickness".

St Fagan's Church in the village of Trecynon near Aberdare in Glamorgan was a new foundation erected from 1851 to 1853. It was destroyed by fire in 1856. Rebuilt by 1856, John Griffith established it as a separate parish from Aberdare's ancient one, which had been dedicated to St John the Baptist prior to the completion of St Elvan's in 1852.

The festival of St Fagan does not appear in any surviving medieval Welsh calendar of the saints, but he had some importance following his description as an apostle: the Blessed John Sugar, martyred in 1604, invoked "Fugatius" and "Damianus" from the gallows as authorities for the antiquity of British Catholicism. Late sources place it on 3 January (with St Dyfan) at Glastonbury; on 10 February at Llandaff; on 8 August; and (with St Dyfan) on 24 or 26 May. This last date—the traditional day of the baptism of King Lucius by the missionaries—is sometimes given as an observance of the Eastern Orthodox diocese of Thyateira and Great Britain, although in fact St Fagan's Day is currently unobserved by any of the major denominations of Wales. His feast day is listed, with a link, under Wikipedia's Eastern Orthodox Liturgics for May 26.
