= Dyfan =

Saint Dyfan
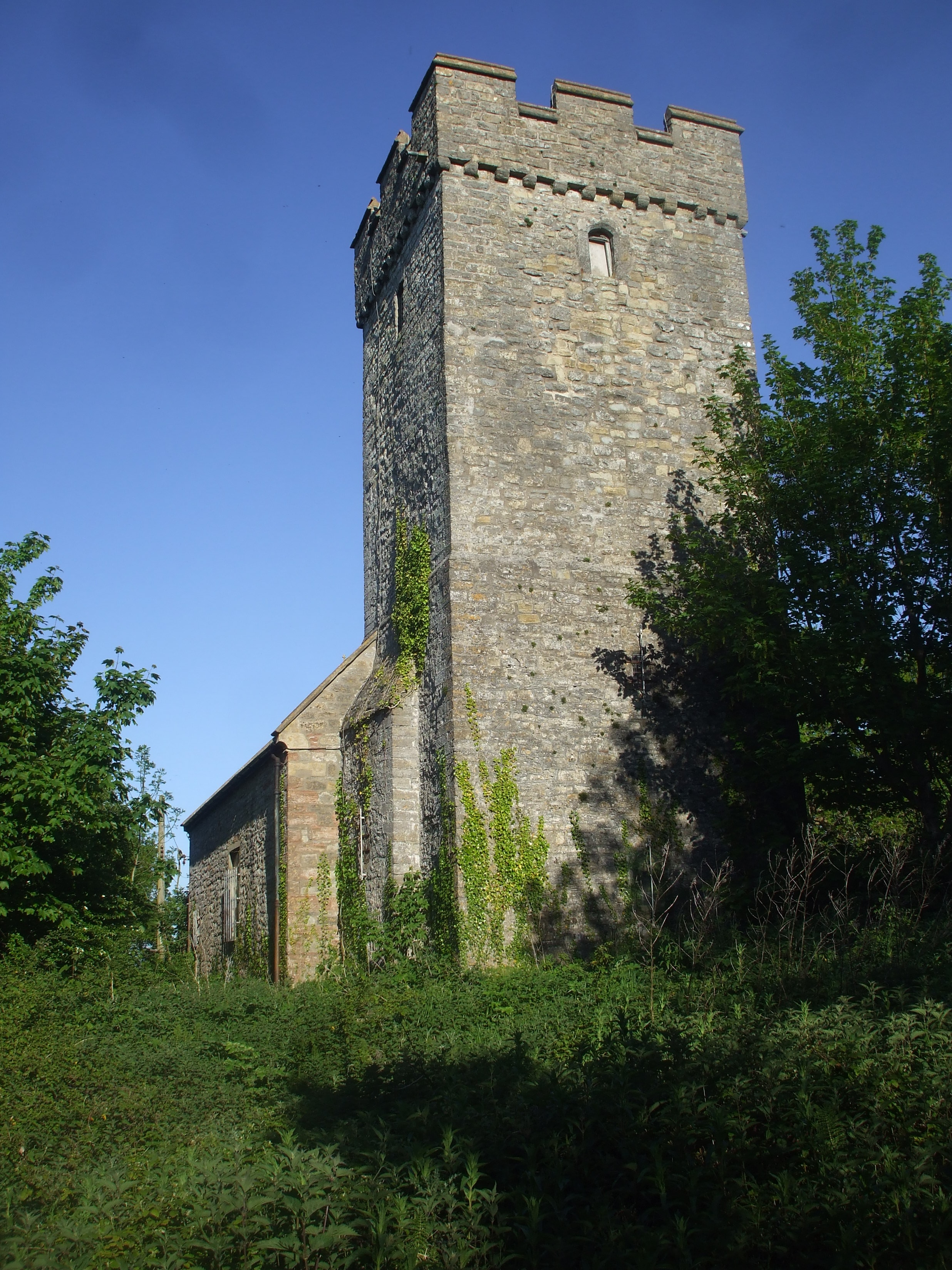
- SS Dyfan & Teilo's in Merthyr Dyfan

Martyr
- Canonized: Pre-Congregation
- Feast: Usually unobserved
- Patronage: Merthyr Dyfan; Llandyfan

Saint Dyfan is a highly obscure figure who was presumably the namesake of Merthyr Dyfan ("martyrium of Dyfan") and therefore an early Christian saint and martyr in southeastern Wales in Roman or Sub-Roman Britain. He is sometimes styled the protomartyr of Wales. The erection of his martyrium was credited to the 6th-century St Teilo. In the 19th century, Edward Williams conflated him with St Deruvian, a figure in the legendary accounts of the baptism of King Lucius of Britain. The discovery of Williams's alterations and forgeries have since discredited this connection. Partially based on this connection, however, the church of Merthyr Dyfan dates his martyrdom to c. 180.

His feast day does not appear in any medieval Welsh calendar of the saints and is not presently observed by the Anglican, Catholic, or Orthodox churches in Wales.

== Legacy ==
The parish church of Merthyr Dyfan is now dedicated jointly to SS Dyfan and Teilo. As late as 2010, it continued to promote itself as the oldest Christian settlement in Wales on the basis of Dyfan's supposed connection to the King Lucius legends.

There is a Llandyfan ("St Dyfan's") outside Ammanford notable for its importance in the early Welsh Nonconformist movement. The only structure is a chapel of ease erected for visitors to the holy well nearby esteemed for treatment of paralysis and related illnesses. This was known as Ffynnon Gwyddfaen or Gwyddfân (Note: Catholic Llandeilo, cited by Norman.) and Roberts argues against its connection with Dyfan "because the place was always called Llandyfân with the accent on the last syllable", appearing in earlier records as Llanduvaen. Instead, he notes the similarity of the name with Dyfnan, a supposed son of the invading Irishman Brychan of Brycheiniog. (Note: History of the Parish of Llandybie, cited and translated by Norman.)

The festival of St Dyfan does not appear in any surviving medieval Welsh calendar of the saints, It sometimes appears in places where St Deruvian is clearly intended; in Willis, it appears on St Doewan's Day, an apparent confusion of the two. The feast is not currently unobserved by any of the major denominations of Wales.

== See also ==
- List of Welsh saints
