= Tre-Ysgawen =

Welsh hamlet

Coordinates: 53.303832°N 4.327417°W

- Location within Anglesey
- OS grid reference: SH 4501 8107
  - Cardiff: 135 mi (217 km)
  - London: 216.2 mi (347.9 km)
- Community: Llanddyfnan
- Principal area: Anglesey
- Country: Wales
- Sovereign state: United Kingdom
- Post town: Llangefni
- Police: North Wales
- Fire: North Wales
- Ambulance: Welsh
- UK Parliament: Ynys Môn
- Senedd Cymru – Welsh Parliament: Ynys Môn

Tre-Ysgawen is a hamlet in the community of Llanddyfnan, Anglesey, Wales, which is 135 miles (217.3 km) from Cardiff and 216.2 miles (347.9 km) from London.

The name comes from the Welsh language: "Tre" meaning "homestead" and "ysgawen": "the elder tree".

== See also ==
- List of localities in Wales by population
