= Pope Eleutherius =

Head of the Catholic Church from c. 174 to 189

Pope Saint Eleutherius
- Bishop of Rome
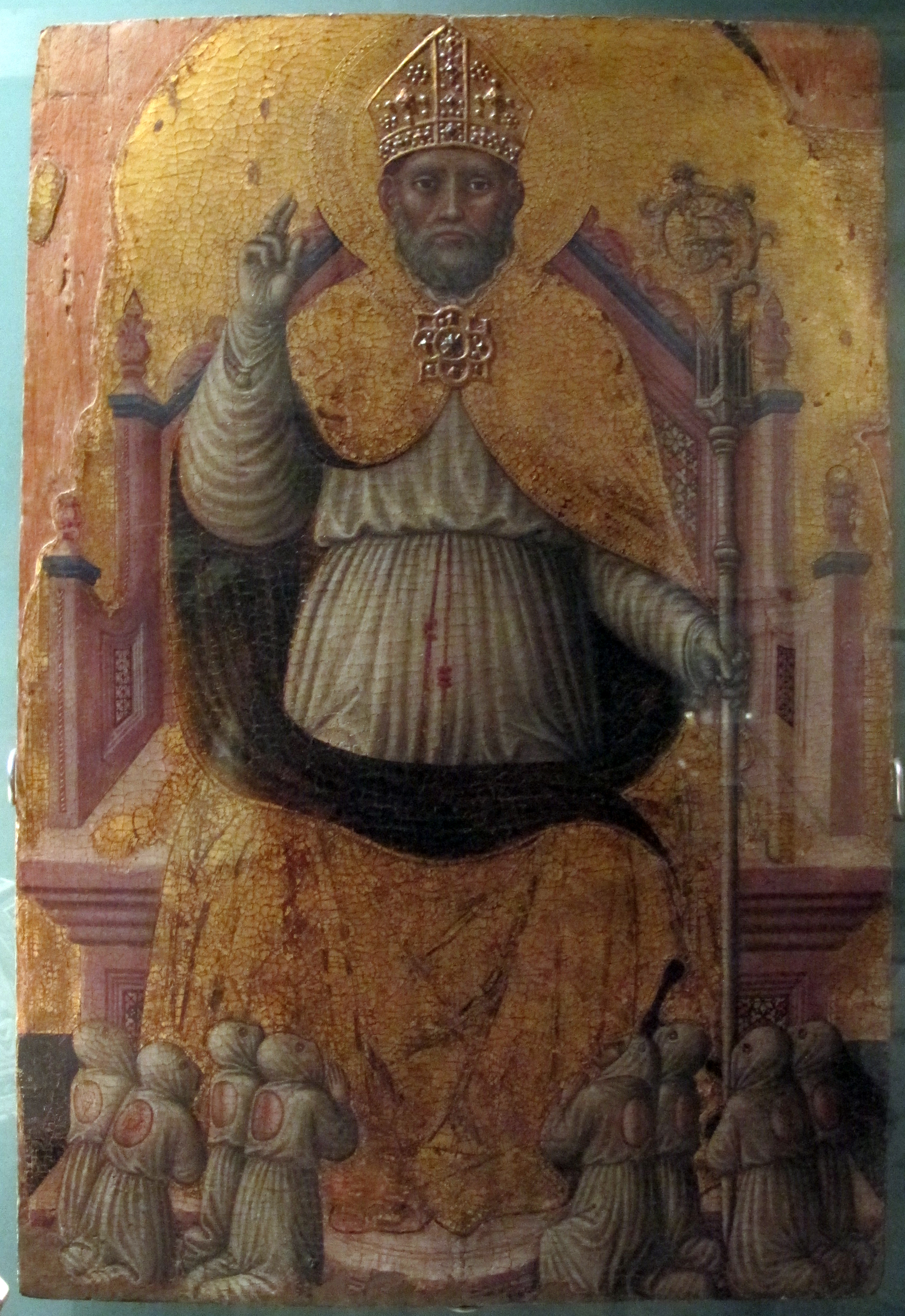
- 15th century portrayal of St. Eleutherius from the Gallery of the Palazzo Farnese
- Church: Catholic Church
- Papacy began: c. 174
- Papacy ended: 189
- Predecessor: Soter
- Successor: Victor I

Personal details
- Born: Nicopolis, Epirus, Roman Empire
- Died: 24 May 189 Rome, Italy, Roman Empire

Sainthood
- Feast day: 26 May

Pope Eleutherius (Greek: Ελευθέριος; died 24 May 189), also known as Eleutherus (Greek: Ελεύθερος), was the bishop of Rome from c. 174 until his death in 189. His pontificate is alternatively dated to 171–185 or 177–193. He is venerated as a saint in the Catholic Church.

He is linked to a number of legends; one of them credited him with receiving a letter from "Lucius, King of Britain".

== Life ==
According to the Liber Pontificalis, he was a Greek born in Nicopolis in Epirus, Greece. (Note: Charles A. Coulombe writes in his work Vicars of Christ that both the nations of Greeks and Albanians claim him as their own.) His contemporary Hegesippus wrote that he was a deacon of the Roman Church under Pope Anicetus (c. 154–164), and remained so under Pope Soter, whom he succeeded around 174. (Note: Hegesippus, cited in Eusebius 1885, Bk IV, Ch 22)

== Dietary law ==
The 6th-century recension of Liber Pontificalis ('Book of the Popes') known as the "Felician Catalog" (Note: Catalogus Felicianus, named for its ending during the pontificate of Felix IV. The earliest surviving codex dates to the 9th century.) includes additional commentary to the work's earlier entry on Eleutherius. One addition ascribes to Eleutherius the reissuance of a decree: (Note: "Et hoc iterum firmavit ut nulla esca a Christianis repudiaretur, maxime fidelibus, quod Deus creavit, quæ tamen rationalis et humana est.") "And he again affirmed that no food should be repudiated by Christians strong in their faith, as God created it, [provided] however that it is sensible and edible." Such a decree might have been issued against early continuations of Jewish dietary law and against similar laws practiced by the Gnostics and Montanists. It is also possible, however, that the editor of the passage attributed to Eleutherius a decree similar to another issued around the year 500 in order to give it greater authority.

== British mission ==
Another addition credited Eleutherius with receiving a letter from "Lucius, King of Britain" or "King of the Britons", declaring an intention to convert to Christianity. (Note: In Haddan, Stubbs & Wilkins 1869, p. 25, this passage is given as "Hic accepit epistulam a Lucio Britanniæ Rege ut Christianus efficeretur per ejus mandatum." ('He accepted a letter from Lucius, King of Britain, that he might become a Christian by his own will.') In Knight 2012, p. 14 the passage is quoted as "Hic accepit epistolam a Lucio Brittaniorum rege ut Xrianus efficeretur per ejus mandatum." ('He accepted a letter from Lucius, king of the Britons, that he might become a Xian by his own will.')) Authoratiative accounts from the 1st and 2nd century, of Terullian, St. Clement, and St. Iraneaus, referred to Britain as being of the first as having been impacted by the Christian faith. Lately, ancient religious records have been quickly labeled as pious forgery, however it has been admittedly reproduced by several of the most reliable, including the letter itself transcribed by John Foxe in his sixteenth-century work Actes and Monuments. This stands alongside the reputations of Liber Pontificalis written in 535 AD, the Cistercian Hagiagropher Jocelyn in the 12th Century, Gildas, Geoffrey of Monmouth, Bede, Urban, John of Tynemouth, and Capgrave, that preceded Foxe by nearly 1,000 years. Those who question its validity will then move to discussion over its original purpose. Haddan, Stubbs, and Wilkins considered the passage "manifestly written in the time and tone" of Prosper of Aquitaine, secretary to Pope Leo the Great in the mid-5th century, and supportive of the missions of Germanus of Auxerre and Palladius. Duchesne dated the entry a little later to the pontificate of Boniface II around 530, and Mommsen to the early 7th century. Only the last would support the conjecture that it aimed to support the Gregorian mission to the Anglo-Saxons led by Augustine of Canterbury, who encountered great difficulty with the native British Christians, as at the Synod of Chester. Indeed, the Celtic Christians invoked the antiquity of their church to generally avoid submission to Canterbury until the Norman conquest, but no arguments invoking the mission to Lucius appear to have been made by either side during the synods among the Welsh and Saxon bishops.

Some claim that the first Englishman to mention the story was Bede and he seems to have taken it, not from native texts or traditions, but from The Book of the Popes. Subsequently, it appeared in the 9th-century History of the Britons traditionally credited to Nennius: The account relates that a mission from the pope baptised "Lucius, the Britannic king, with all the petty kings of the whole Britannic people". The account, however, dates this baptism to AD 167 (a little before Eleutherius's pontificate) and credits it to Evaristus (reigned c. 99 – c. 107). In the 12th century, more details began to be added to the story. Geoffrey of Monmouth's pseudohistorical History of the Kings of Britain goes into great detail concerning Lucius and names the pope's envoys to him as Fagan and Duvian. The 12th-century Book of Llandaf placed the court of Lucius in southern Wales and names his emissaries to the pope as Elfan and Medwy.

Others cite the reliable histories from centuries before: "Gildas, Geoffrey of Monmouth, Bede, Urban, John of [Tynemouth] and Capgrave, referred to 'as the most learned of English Augustinians whom the soil of England ever produced', support the date of return of the emissaries of King Lucius from visiting Bishop Eleutherius at Rome, as that given in the British annals, a.d. 183, over a century and a half before the Roman Catholic Church was founded. Cardinal Baronius not only denounces the Augustinian claim but in detail recites the whole record from the year a.d. 36 onward."

An echo of this legend penetrated even to Switzerland. In a homily preached at Chur and preserved in an 8th- or 9th-century manuscript, Timothy is represented as an apostle to Gaul, whence he went into Roman Britain and baptised a king named Lucius, who himself became a missionary to Gaul and finally settled at Chur, where he preached the gospel with great success. In this way Lucius, the early missionary of the Swiss district of Chur, became identified with the alleged British king of the Liber Pontificalis.

Harnack suggests that in the document which the compiler of the Liber Pontificalis drew his information, the name found was not Britanio, but Britio. Now this is the name (Birtha-, Britium) of the fortress of Edessa. The king in question is, therefore, Lucius Ælius Septimus Megas Abgar VIII, of Edessa, a Christian king as is well known. The original statement of the Liber Pontificalis, in this hypothesis, had nothing to do with Britain; the compiler of the Liber Pontificalis changed Britio to Brittanio, and in this way made a British king of the Syrian Lucius.

== Death ==
According to the Liber Pontificalis, Pope Eleutherius died on 24 May and was buried on the Vatican Hill (in Vaticano) near the body of Peter the Apostle. Later tradition has his body moved to the church of San Giovanni della Pigna, near the pantheon. In 1591, his remains were again moved to the church of Santa Susanna at the request of Camilla Peretti, the sister of Pope Sixtus V. His feast is celebrated on 26 May.

== See also ==
- List of popes
- List of Catholic saints

Titles of the Great Christian Church
Preceded by Soter	Pope; 175–189	Succeeded by Victor I
