= Merthyr Dyfan =

- District of Barry and parish/ward
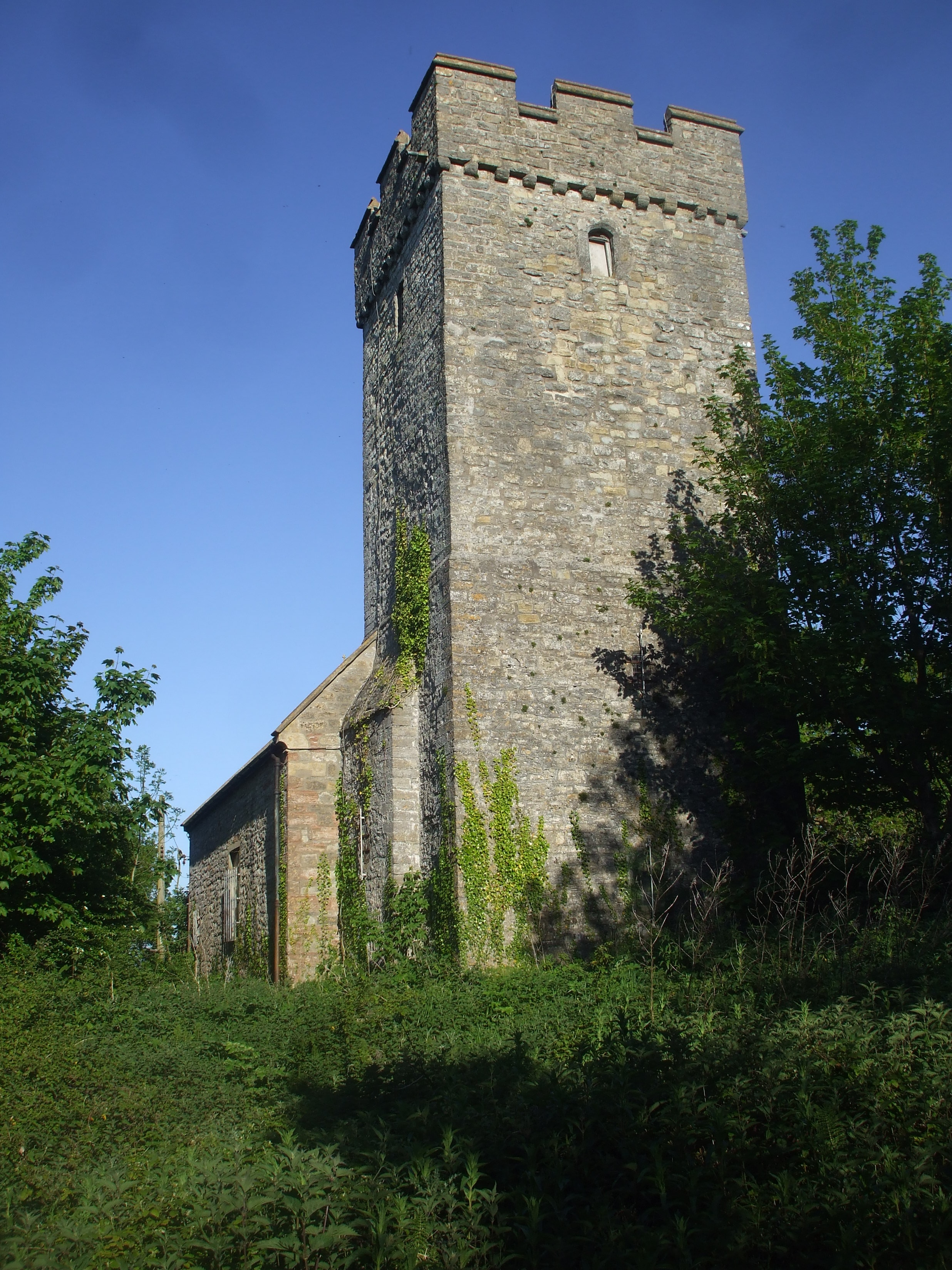
- The parish church of St Dyfan and St Teilo

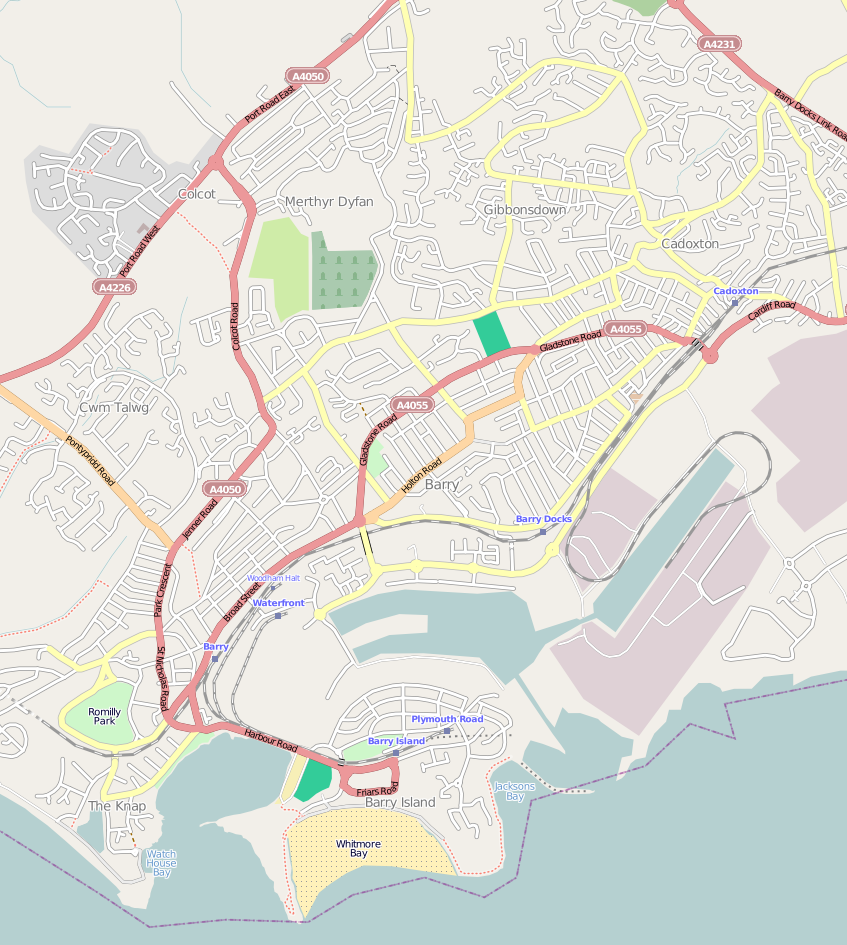
- Location in Barry
- Coordinates: 51°25′14″N 3°16′15″W
- Country: United Kingdom
- Region: Wales
- County: Vale of Glamorgan
- Town: Barry

Population (2011)
  - Total: 5,166
- (ward)
- Time zone: UTC+0 (GMT)
- Postal code: CF62
- Area code: CF

Merthyr Dyfan or Dyfan is a northeastern suburb of Barry in the Vale of Glamorgan, in south Wales, formerly an independent medieval village. It is also an ecclesiastical parish and a formal electoral ward of the Vale of Glamorgan. It borders Colcot to the west, Buttrills to the southwest and Gibbonsdown to the southeast. Its main roads are Merthyr Dyfan Road, a hilly road leading down from the A4050 road (Port Road) which leads into Wenvoe and Cardiff; and Skomer Road which separates it from Gibbonsdown and eventually also leads to the A4050 road. Merthyr Dyfan contains an old parish church, Barry Rugby Club, Bryn Hafren Comprehensive School and the Master Mariner Pub and Holm View Leisure Centre, although the last two could be considered to be in northern Gibbonsdown.

== History ==
Although the usual modern meaning of the Welsh word merthyr (from the Greek μαρτυς, μαρτυρος "witness") is 'martyr', the word formerly also indicated a martyrium, a martyr's grave or a structure or church erected at such a grave. (Note: The Cornish and Breton language equivalents, in place names, are merther and merzher.) Similar examples, all in south Wales, are Merthyr Cynog, Merthyr Tydfil, and Merthyr Mawr. Of the Dyfan who presumably inspired the name, nothing seems to be known, although the Iolo Manuscripts collected by Edward Williams have led to his popular conflation with the St Deruvian who was added to the King Lucius legends in the 12th century. Owing to Williams's numerous forgeries and additions to other texts, however, this identification is now generally discredited. Baring-Gould notes Deruvian's "whole history, from beginning to end, is a pure fabrication, and the church of Merthyr Dyfan has been made to serve as a peg to hang it on". The earliest historic church at the site was credited (and then dedicated) to St Teilo in the 6th century. The current church is Norman, built in the early 13th century, and was consecrated by Bishop William de Burgh of Llandaff in 1250. The church fell into neglect during the Reformation period but was fully restored in the late 19th century. In 1970 it underwent renovation: amongst other things, the windows were reglazed and the church was reroofed in Welsh slate. It is now formally dedicated to both Saints Dyfan and Teilo and as recently as 2010 the local parish claimed it to be the oldest Christian site in Wales, citing the legends concerning King Lucius. (Note: In fact, the Lucius legends never accorded such a place to Merthyr Dyfan, were developed as a means of buttressing the antiquity of Glastonbury, and (when places in Wales were mentioned) involved foundations at Llandaff rather than Merthyr Dyfan. See Lucius of Britain and Saints Deruvian and Fagan.) Since 2016, the church has been one of four in the Barry Church in Wales; her Vicar since 2023 is Fr Dan Barnes-Davies.

The village of Merthyr Dyfan grew up during the medieval period. The centre of the original village and church are located in what today is the southwesternmost part of Merthyr Dyfan district. It was originally located around 53 to 68 m (174 to 223 ft) above sea level. The centre of the medieval village was excavated by a local man, G. Tyley, between 1968 and 1978. In 1969 he excavated and examined an old corn-drying kiln at the site. The Merthyr Dyfan Chapel is located near the Barry Cemetery to the south, which is actually in the district of Buttrills.

Housing development grew up along Merthyr Dyfan hill, north of the original village, in the early 1950s, and the area to the northwest became a council estate, Colcot. Further extensive development took place between the 1960s and the 1980s, with the building of Bryn Hafren Comprehensive School, and housing estates to the east and southeast (Lundy Park). Holm View Leisure Centre was built around 1990.

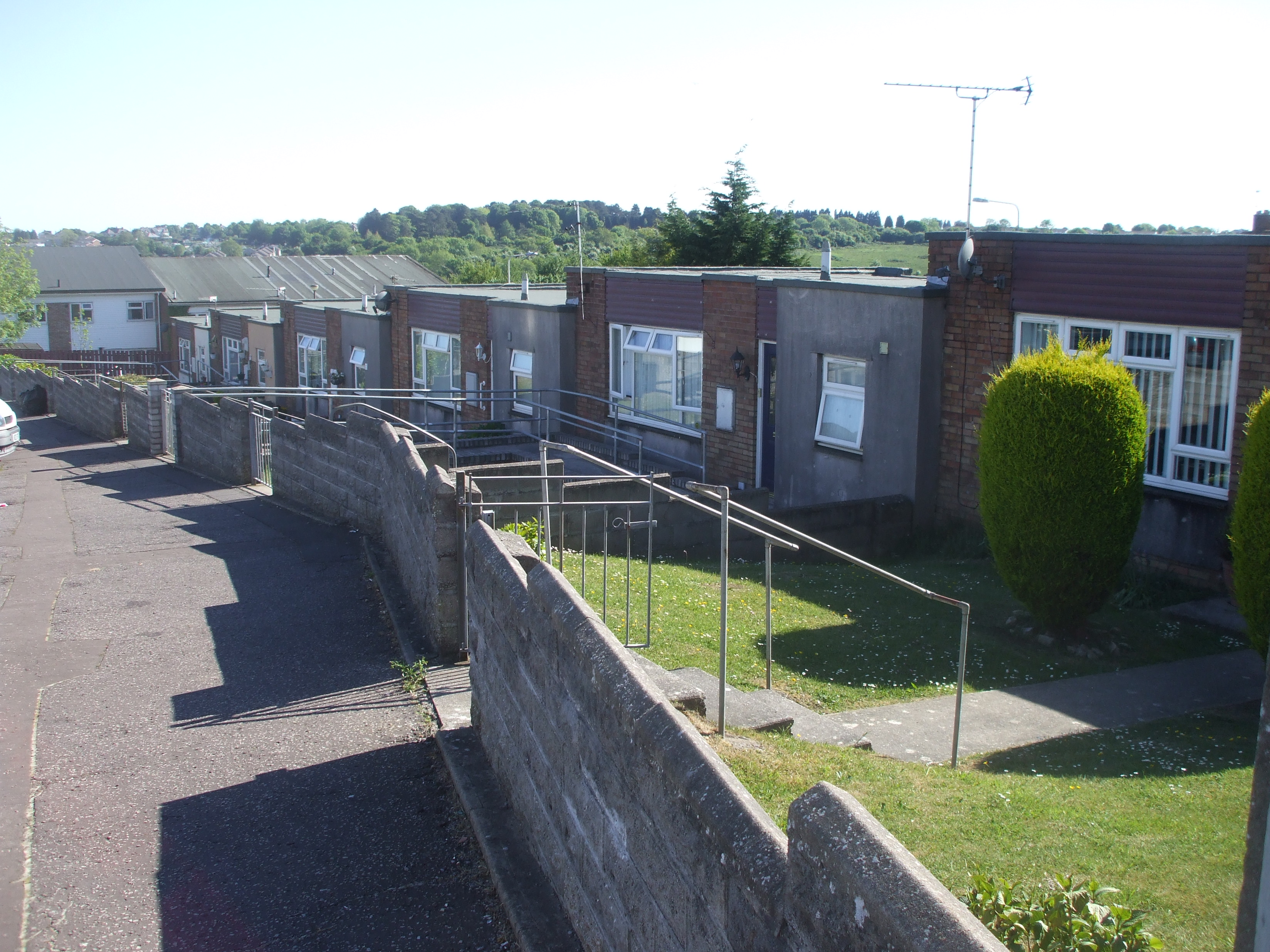
Pendine Close

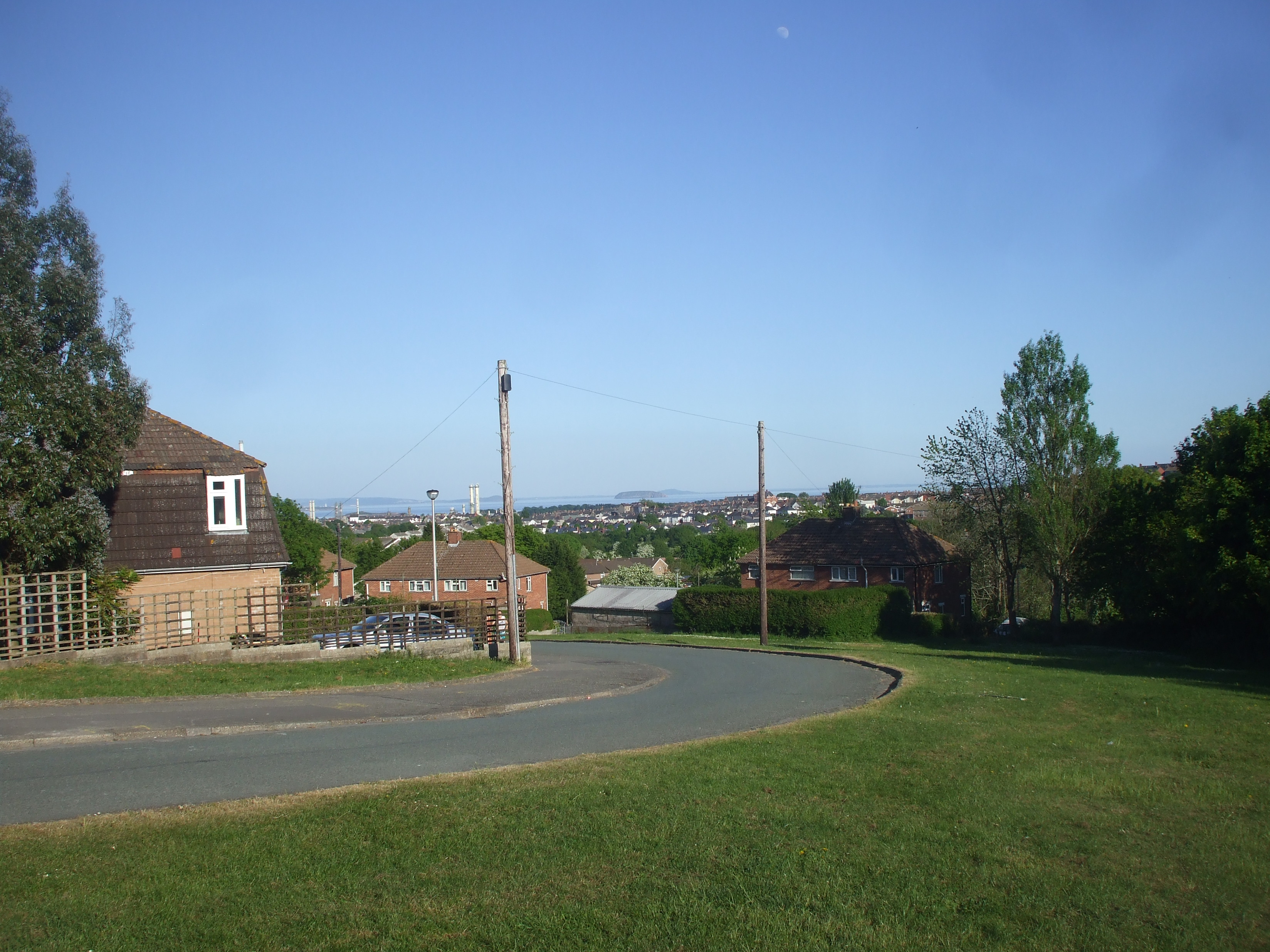
Tennyson Road

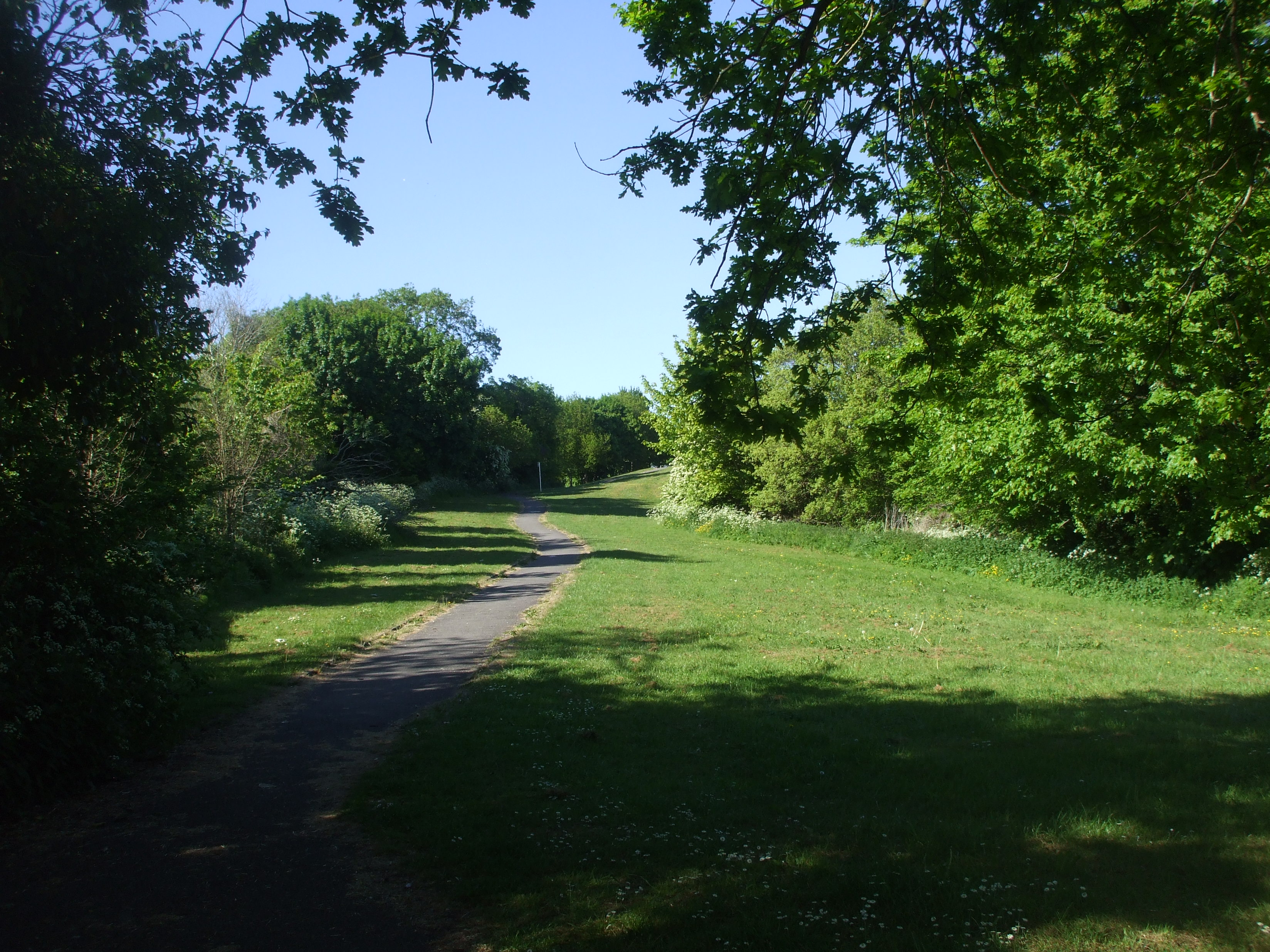
Merthyr Dyfan park, vicinity of the medieval village

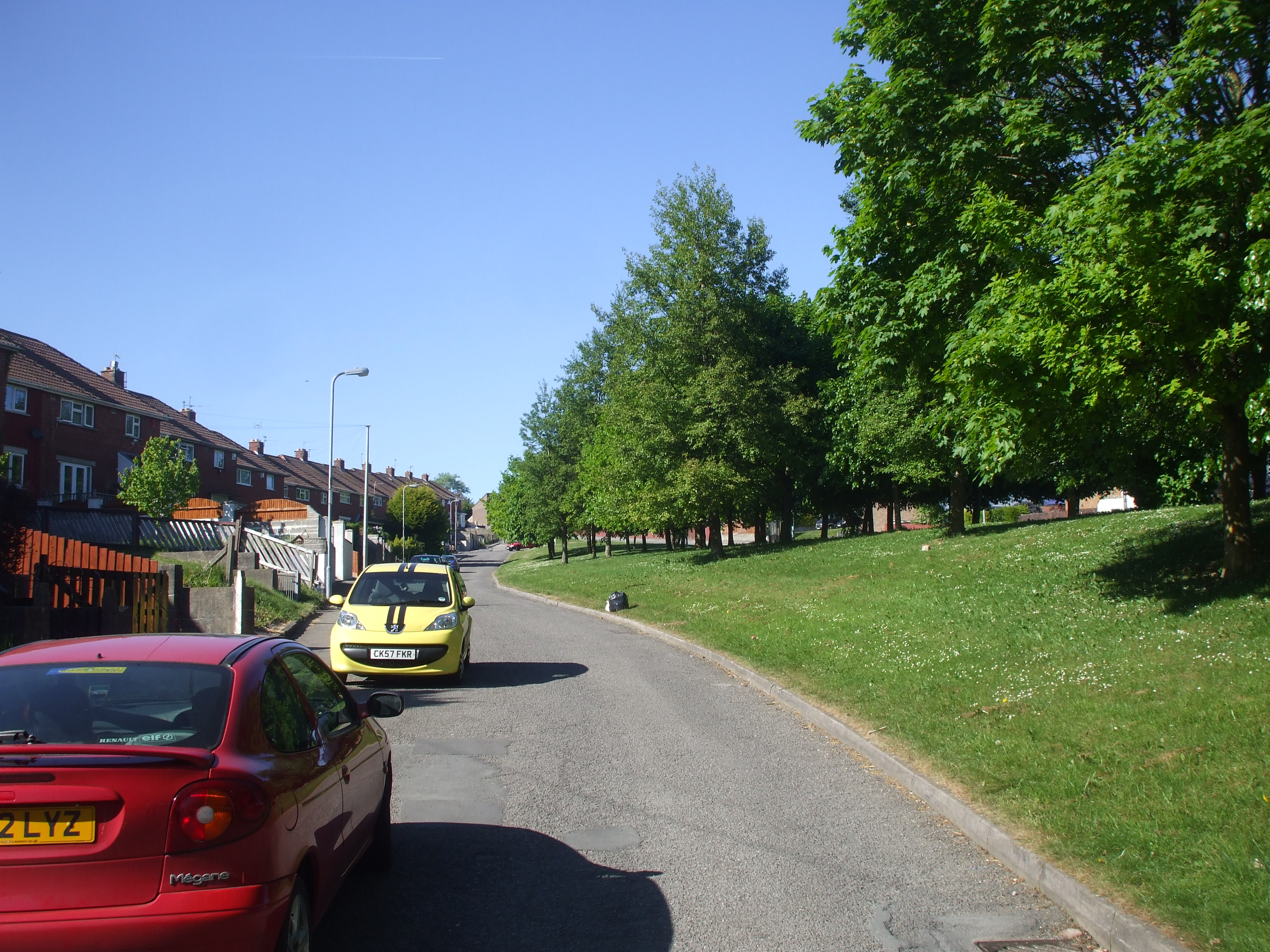
Foot of Merthyr Dyfan Road
