= Lucius of Chur =

Legendary saint

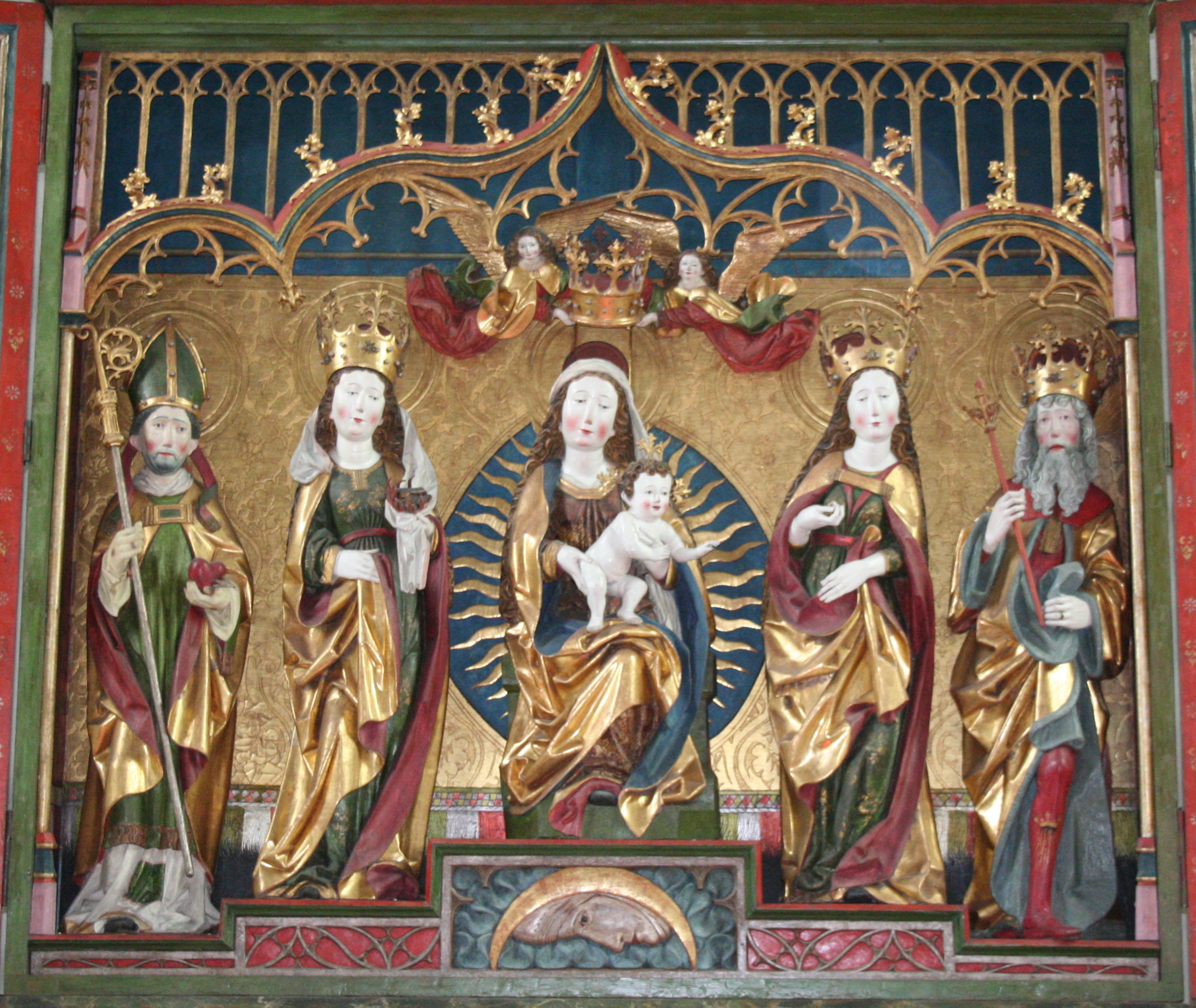
Altarpiece in St. Maria und Michael, Churwalden; Lucius of Chur is at far right

Lucius of Chur (German: Lucius von Chur or Luzius von Chur) is a legendary saint, priest and bishop.

He was born in Britain or, more likely, in Prättigau, Switzerland, and died in the 5th or 6th century presumably in Chur, Prättigau.

According to reliable sources, Lucius worked as missionary in Raetia around the St. Luzisteig Pass near Landquart; the pass is named after him. It is unlikely that he was appointed the first bishop of Chur and died as martyr.

His sister is Saint Emerita.

He is sometimes identified with Lucius of Britain. This is because he is often referred to as Adeliger der Pritanni ('nobleman of the Pritanni'). However, Pritanni here refers to tribe after which the region Prättigau was named, not Britain.

His feast is on 2 December, or for the Catholic Church, on 3 December. He is also venerated in the Orthodox Church.
