= Bernard (bishop of St Davids) =

12th-century Bishop of St David's

Bernard was the first Norman bishop of St David's (1115–1148).

Originally an erudite layman serving as chancellor to Queen Matilda, he was abruptly appointed the bishop of St. David's on 18 September 1115, when King Henry I (Matilda's husband) summoned the chapter of St. David's to London, and persuaded them to choose Bernard as next bishop (the previous bishop having died that year). Immediately, Bernard was sent to the Church of St. Mary Overie and made a priest, that same day; the following day he was made a bishop, in Westminster Abbey.

At that time, the lands of the bishop were a quasi-sovereign territory, a status confirmed that year by Henry I when Bernard, after acknowledging Henry as suzerain of the bishop's realm, was given a charter by the king which designated the lands – Dewisland – as a Marcher Lordship. Bernard was thus the head of the judicial system in Dewisland, could mint coinage, levy tax, raise an army, and declare war on other marcher lords, without falling foul of the king. Furthermore, Bernard disputed the authority of the archbishop of Canterbury over him, arguing that he himself was the metropolitan of Wales; he was the last bishop to dispute the primacy of the see of Canterbury.

Bernard founded Whitland Abbey.
