= Dogfan =

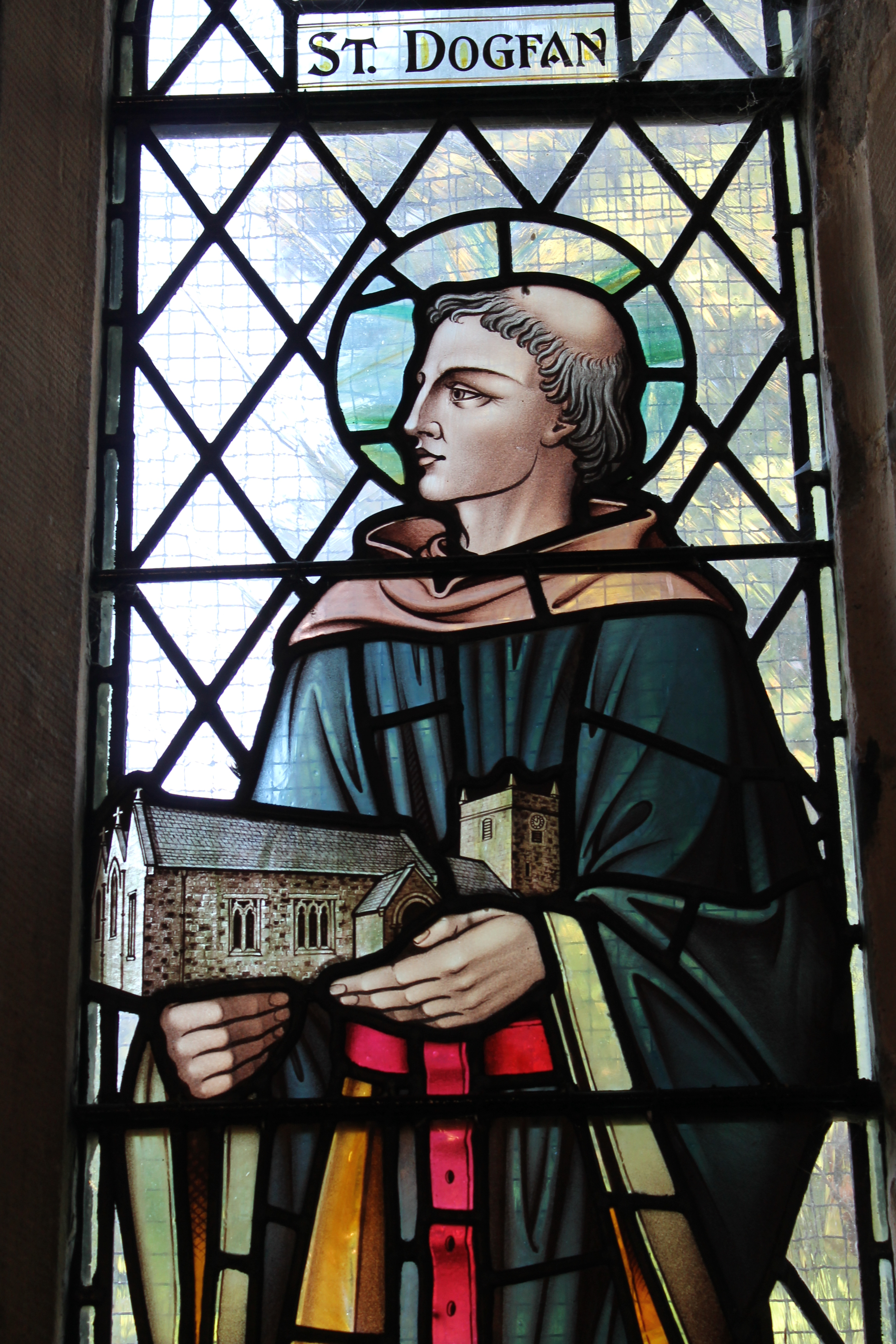
Church of St Dogfan, Llanrhaeadr-ym-Mochnant.

Dogfan, also known as Doewan, was a saint and martyr who lived in 5th century Wales. He is venerated in the Anglican Church, Eastern Orthodox Church, True Orthodox Church, and Roman Catholic Church, on 13 July.

== Family ==
He is the patron saint of Llanrhaeadr-ym-Mochnant in Wales. The town may have been the birthplace of his mother. He was also one of the sons of king Brychan.

== Martyrdom ==
He is said to have been put to death by Anglo-Saxon heathen invaders in Pembrokeshire, where a church was built to his memory.
