= Llanddyfnan =

Village and community in Anglesey, Wales

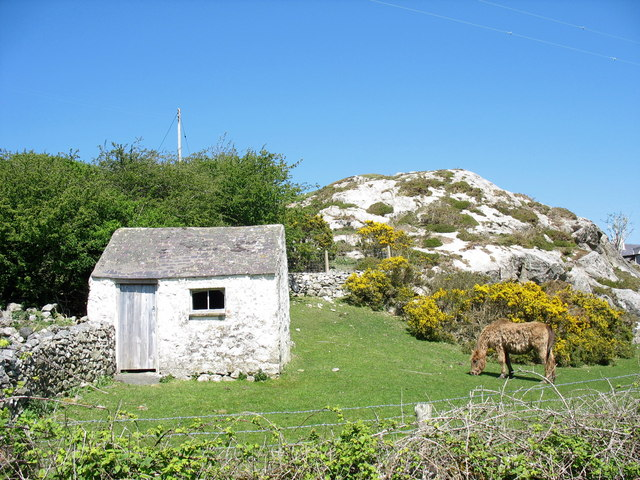
- Mynydd Bodafon

- Location within Anglesey
- Population: 1,061 (2011)
- OS grid reference: SH5078
- Community: Llanddyfnan
- Principal area: Anglesey
- Preserved county: Gwynedd
- Country: Wales
- Sovereign state: United Kingdom
- Post town: LLANGEFNI
- Postcode district: LL77
- Dialling code: 01248
- Police: North Wales
- Fire: North Wales
- Ambulance: Welsh
- UK Parliament: Ynys Môn
- Senedd Cymru – Welsh Parliament: Bangor Conwy Môn
- List of places UK Wales Anglesey 53°17′01″N 4°14′55″W Map of the community

Llanddyfnan is a village and community in Anglesey, Wales, located 3.5 miles (5.6 km) north east of Llangefni, 6.6 miles (10.6 km) north west of Menai Bridge and 7.1 miles (11.4 km) west of Beaumaris.

== Description ==
The community includes the villages of Capel Coch, Ceint, Llanddyfnan, Llangwyllog, Maenaddwyn, Mynydd Bodafon (also the name of the highest point of the main island of Anglesey), Talwrn, Llanfihangel Tre'r Beirdd and Tregaian, and at the 2001 census had a population of 1,027.

== Churches ==
Three of the community's churches are Grade II* listed. Saint Caian's Church at Tregaian dates from at least the 14th century, and contains a window from that period. The south doorway dates from the 15th century, and the pulpit contains 17th century panelling. The circular font dates from the 12th century. Saint Cwyllog's Church at Llangwyllog is thought to date from around 1200, and is mentioned in the Norwich Taxation of 1254, although the earliest dateable features are a doorway and window from the 15th century. The fittings are mainly from the late 18th century, and include a pulpit and reading desk. In the village of Llanddyfnan is Saint Dyfnan's Church, dating from the 14th century, and which includes a doorway to the nave with a two-centred head and carved nude figures. The churchyard includes the graves of some of the victims of the Royal Charter shipwreck of 1859. The ship, travelling from Melbourne to Liverpool with 371 passengers and 112 crew, was driven onto rocks at Moelfre by 100 miles per hour (160 km/h) winds. Over 450 people died. The aftermath was reported by Charles Dickens in The Uncommercial Traveller, and the disaster led the Meteorological Office to introduce the first gale warnings. Nearby is a standing stone 8.5 feet (2.6 m) high, thought to date from the Bronze Age.

== Nature reserves ==
Cors Bodeilio, near Talwrn, is a national nature reserve and wetland of international importance. It is a mire in a shallow limestone valley, where fen species prosper. The site contains uncommon species, including fen pondweed, orchids, curlews, lapwings and snipes. Cors Erddreiniog, also a national nature reserve and located north east of Tregaian, has been described as the "Jewel in the crown of the Anglesey fens" and is home to the bog myrtle, marsh gentian, southern damselfly and hen harrier.

== Governance ==
Most of the community lies within the Canolbarth Môn electoral ward, which is represented by three county councillors on the Isle of Anglesey County Council. The northern 'finger' of the community, including Capel Coch and Maenaddwyn, lies in the Lligwy ward.

Llanddyfnan has a community council, with ten community councillors.
