= Dyfnan =

Saint Dyfnan

Confessor
- Canonized: Pre-Congregation
- Feast: 24 April
- Patronage: Llanddyfnan

Saint Dyfnan ap Brychan was an obscure Welsh saint. He was sometimes accounted a son of Brychan, the invading Irish king of Brycheiniog.

== Legacy ==
Llanddyfnan ("St Dyfnan's") was dedicated to him on Anglesey and claimed his relics. He is commemorated on 24 April.
