= Terry Norman =

American photographer

Terrence Brooks Norman (born April 30, 1949) is a former Kent State University student and FBI informant whose alleged role in the Kent State shootings has been cloaked in mystery since the tragedy, which claimed the lives of four unarmed students at an anti-Vietnam War rally.

== The shooting ==
Norman was a criminology junior at the university on May 4, 1970, when soldiers from the Ohio National Guard suddenly opened fire on the crowd of students. Norman, who described himself as a "gung-ho" informant, was present and armed at the rally while he photographed the demonstrators for the campus police and the FBI, a fact that was initially denied by both agencies but later confirmed. After the shooting, Sylvester Del Corso, the Ohio National Guard's top general, released a public statement that Norman had admitted firing four shots in self-defense. He later backed off from that statement, however.

There were several reasons why Norman is widely believed to have played a central role in the police action:

- Norman worked with the FBI at the height of its COINTELPRO (counter-intelligence program) activities. In the words of director J. Edgar Hoover, its purpose was to "expose, disrupt, misdirect, discredit or otherwise neutralize" anti-war organizations as well as individual demonstrators with no group affiliation. Students Allison Krause and Jeffrey Miller, two of the Kent State shooting victims, fit this profile;
- Norman was the only person on campus other than a Guardsman who admitted to having a firearm at the scene;
- The Guard contended that a single shot of unknown origin preceded the 13-second volley of gunfire; and
- There had been a previous and never-fully-explained incident on Blanket Hill in which Norman drew his gun and pointed it at students who had attacked him. Norman had scuffled with some fellow students and reportedly had drawn his gun before being chased by several men to the campus police and National Guard. One of his pursuers, graduate student Harold Reid, yelled, "Stop that man! He has a gun!"

== First investigations of Norman's role ==
The FBI addressed speculation regarding Norman's involvement by announcing that his gun had never been fired. However, the issue of his role on May 4 was revived three years later. Peter Davies, the author of the book The Truth About Kent State, and William A. Gordon, a journalist for the college's student newspaper and the future author of Four Dead in Ohio, reported that there were three additional witnesses who said they had heard either Norman admit "I had to shoot" or a Kent State police detective exclaim, "My God, he fires his gun four times. What the hell do we do now?"

In the wake of this new evidence, a Congressional subcommittee overseeing the Justice Department and the Justice Department itself began reviews of the case. Once news of the investigation broke, John Martin, the captain of one of the National Guard units that fired shots, came forward with the statements of his men, including one who thought he overheard Norman admit to shooting one person. That revelation in turn resulted in an accusation by Senator Birch Bayh that Norman may have been "the fatal catalyst" of the tragedy.

At the time Norman was accused of starting the Kent shootings, there were not any witnesses who actually saw him fire his .38 gun much less shoot a student. All the witnesses who thought they heard either Norman or the detective say that Norman had fired four shots had been at the university's ROTC building, approximately one hundred yards from the shooting.

After the accusations had been made, John Dunphy of the Akron Beacon Journal wrote several articles that seemed to exonerate Norman. Dunphy interviewed a new witness, Tom Masterson, who admitted he was the student who had attacked Norman. Masterson also supported Norman's claim that he had only drawn his gun after the shootings and in self-defense.

An audio analysis commissioned by the Justice Department of the 67 shots fired that day appeared to further exonerate Norman. The analysis, performed for the Justice Department by the Massachusetts firm Bolt, Beranek and Newman (the same firm that discovered the 18 1/2 minute gap in the Nixon tapes), concluded that three shots preceded the 13-second volley, all were fired by M-1 rifles carried by the Guardsmen, and there was such a short period of time between the first three shots and the sustained 13-second volley, a shot from one individual could not have triggered the others.

Yet unanswered questions remain. Norman subsequently admitted to positioning himself between the Guardsmen and the protestors and throwing rocks at the students. He claimed to have thrown two or three rocks, but Masterson put the number at closer to "half a dozen, a dozen". Captain John Martin said that he had also noticed Norman throwing rocks and had asked himself, "What is this idiot doing?" It is unclear whether Norman acted at the behest of the agencies to whom he reported — the university police and the FBI — or whether he acted on his own.

It is also unclear why the FBI initially lied to the public when it claimed to have no relationship with Norman, and why the Bureau announced that his gun had never been fired. An FBI lab report surfaced which indicated that Norman's pistol had been fired since its last cleaning. However, the lab was unable to ascertain when or where the gun had most recently been discharged.

== Life since the shootings ==
In a 2004 Tampa Tribune story, former Cleveland Plain Dealer writer Janis Froelich examined Norman's life since the shooting. According to the article, Norman had lived in three states and held several different jobs. Froelich located Norman in 2006 living in North Carolina and working as a car salesman.

== New evidence ==
In 2006, James Renner, current editor of the Cleveland Independent newspaper, described Norman in the Free Times as a possible agent provocateur. Renner stated, "I think he was hired by the FBI to incite instability within SDS."

In 2007 Alan Canfora, one of the nine wounded students, located a copy of a tape of the shootings in a library archive. The original 30-minute, reel-to-reel tape was made by Terry Strubbe, a Kent State communications student who turned on his recorder and put its microphone in his dorm window overlooking the campus. A 2010 audio analysis of a tape recording of the incident by Stuart Allen and Tom Owen, who were described by the Cleveland Plain Dealer as "nationally respected forensic audio experts," concluded that the guardsmen were given an order to fire. It is the only known recording to capture the events leading up to the shootings.

Allen continued to study the tape and also found that someone had fired four shots some 70 seconds prior to the National Guardsmen opening fire. The evidence appears to implicate Norman as the shooter. The state of Ohio and the U.S. Justice Department declined to review the new evidence.
