= Rice Rees =

British writer and historian (1804–1839)

Rice Rees (31 March 1804 – 20 May 1839) was a Welsh cleric and historian.

== Life ==
Rees was born at Ton, near Llandovery, Carmarthenshire, Wales, son of David- of a distinguished Llandovery family- and Sarah Rees, and christened in the local Independent chapel. From 1819, he was educated for a short time at Lampeter grammar school, under Eliezer Williams, before being educated at home and by his uncle, William Jenkins Rees. He matriculated at Jesus College, Oxford in 1822. He was appointed to a college scholarship in 1825 and graduated with a B.A. degree in 1826 and a M.A. degree in 1828. His tutor was Llewelyn Lewellin, who in 1827 was appointed as the first Principal of St David's College, Lampeter (which later became the University of Wales, Lampeter). Rees was appointed as lecturer in Welsh and librarian at St David's College. He was elected to a Fellowship of Jesus College in 1828, retaining this position until his death. He was ordained deacon in 1827 and priest in 1828, becoming rector of Llanddewi Velfrey, Pembrokeshire in 1832, obtaining a B.D. degree in 1837 and being appointed chaplain to the Bishop of St Davids, John Jenkinson, in 1838.

His book, The Welsh Saints, was described by the historian Sir J. E. Lloyd as "full and luminous". It was based on a prize-winning essay Rees wrote for the 1835 Carmarthen eisteddfod and was thereafter expanded, and published by his brother, William Rees, in 1836. He was also a member of the committee appointed to revise the Welsh Book of Common Prayer. He died suddenly, apparently from overwork, at Newbridge-on-Wye on 20 May 1839 when travelling from Cascob to Lampeter, and was buried at Llandingad. His unfinished work on the Liber Landavensis, a Welsh 12th century chronicle of the history of the Diocese of Llandaff, was completed by his uncle.
