= Gŵyl Mabsant =

A Gŵyl Mabsant (Welsh for "Feast of the Patron"), also known as the patronal festival or Wake of a parish, is a traditional Welsh festival held annually in commemoration of the patron saint of a parish. Prior to 1752, the corresponding fair was reckoned by the Saint's Day according to tradition or to the official Catholic or Anglican Calendar of Saints; following the shift to New Style dating, however, the fair was reckoned eleven days later. (For example, St. Teilo's Fair in Llandeilo was originally held on 9 February but came to be held on the 20th.) By the 19th century, the fair often began on the following Sunday and then lasted between three days and a week.

By that time, the Reformation had already removed the religious solemnities formerly observed and replaced them with programmes of recreational activities. Owing to the combination of betting, feasting, and drinking, parish festivals built up a reputation for their rowdiness. The local, rural nature of the fairs also occasioned many variations in the rules of the contests, leading to disagreements between parishes. The fairs had mostly died out by the 1860s.

== Customs ==
- Cockfighting: Birds were specially trained for the contest and the owner of a victorious cockerel was held in high esteem; large amounts of money could be wagered on the outcome of the fights.
- Grinning Matches: For old women
- Eating Hot Pudding
- Bando: A team sport, similar to the modern game of field hockey; teams used clubs to strike a ball towards a goal. It continued in some areas until the late 19th century and was particularly popular in Glamorgan.

== See also ==
- List of Welsh saints, including their feasts
- Patronal festival
