= Lucius of Britain =

Legendary 2nd century king of the Britons

Lucius
- King of the Britons
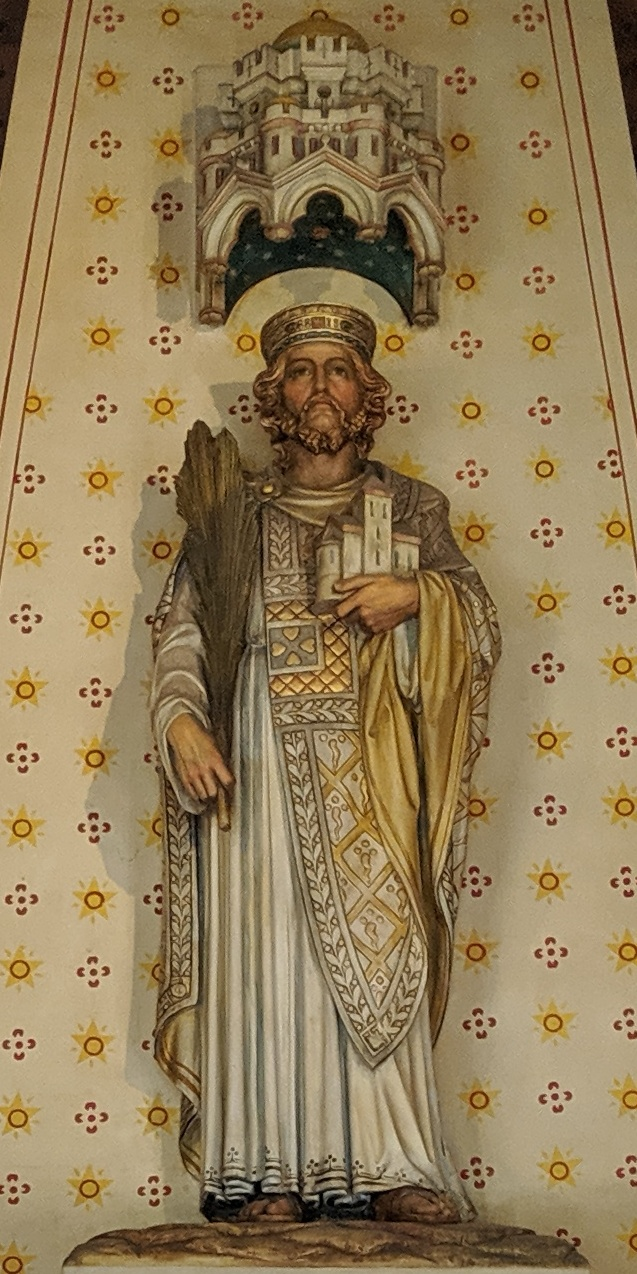
- depiction of Saint Lucius at Castell Coch, Wales. He is seen cradling the church he founded at London (now St Peter upon Cornhill)

King of the Britons
- Reign: 2nd century AD
- Predecessor: Coilus
- Successor: Interregnum
- Born: c. 110 or 125; Llanilid or Ewyas
- Died: c. 156; Gloucester
- Welsh: Lles map Coel; Lleufer; Lleufer Mawr
- Father: Coilus
- Mother: Ystradwl verch Cyllin

Lucius or Lucius of Britain (Welsh: Lles map Coel, Lleufer or Lleufer Mawr) was a legendary king of the Britons reigning in the 2nd-century who is credited with introducing Christianity to Britain. Lucius is first mentioned in a 6th-century version of the Liber Pontificalis, which records that he sent a letter to Pope Eleutherius asking to be made a Christian.

The story was repeated by Bede in the 8th century, who added the detail that after Eleutherius granted Lucius' request, the Britons followed their king in converting to Christianity and that they maintained the Christian faith until the Diocletianic Persecution of 303. Later writers attribute the foundation of churches and missionary activity to Lucius.

== Evidence in Papal records ==
The earliest evidence for Lucius is unique among figures in Welsh mythology and Geoffrey's writings as it comes from texts unconnected with British sources, but the Liber Pontificalis written in 532 AD. In the entry for Pope Eleutherius it notes that:

Hic accepit epistolam a Lucio Brittaniorum rege ut Xrianus efficeretur per ejus mandatum

Translation:

He received a letter from Lucius, King of Britain, asking him to appoint a way by which Lucius might become a Christian

Unfortunately, any information on Eleutherius and Lucius is missing in the extant versions of earlier papal lists (such as the Liberian Catalogue of 354 AD). As such we can only be certain that the Lucius legend was known in Rome by the mid sixth century.

== Academic debates ==
Because there is no other contemporary evidence for a British King Lucius, either in the writings of antiquity or in subsequently discovered artefacts (e.g. coins or inscriptions), academics question if he really existed.

In 1868 Arthur West Haddan and William Stubbs suggested that it might have been pious fiction invented to support the efforts of missionaries in Britain in the time of Saint Patrick and Palladius. Since the early twentieth century most scholars have believed that his appearance in the Liber Pontificalis is the result of a scribal error, based on a theory proposed by German scholar Adolf von Harnack. Von Harnack argued that King Lucius was actually King Abgar VIII of Edessa and the mix-up was due to a scribal error. Von Harnack then suggested that a scribe had used Agbar's middle name of Lucius, and had mistakenly described him as King of 'Britanio' (e.g. Britain) instead of 'Britio', a citadel of Edessa, present day Şanlıurfa in Turkey.

Harnack's proposal has been more recently challenged by British archaeologist David J. Knight. In his book King Lucius of Britain, Knight argues that Abgar of Edessa was never called Lucius of Britio/Birtha in contemporary sources, and that to call Lucius King of a 'Citadel' (eg Britio) is non-sensical. Furthermore, Agbar was only granted his additional Latin names; Lucius Aelius Septeimus, sometime after 193 AD, several years after Lucius' conversion. Knight therefore argues for accepting the traditional identification of Lucius as a British ruler.

== British sources ==
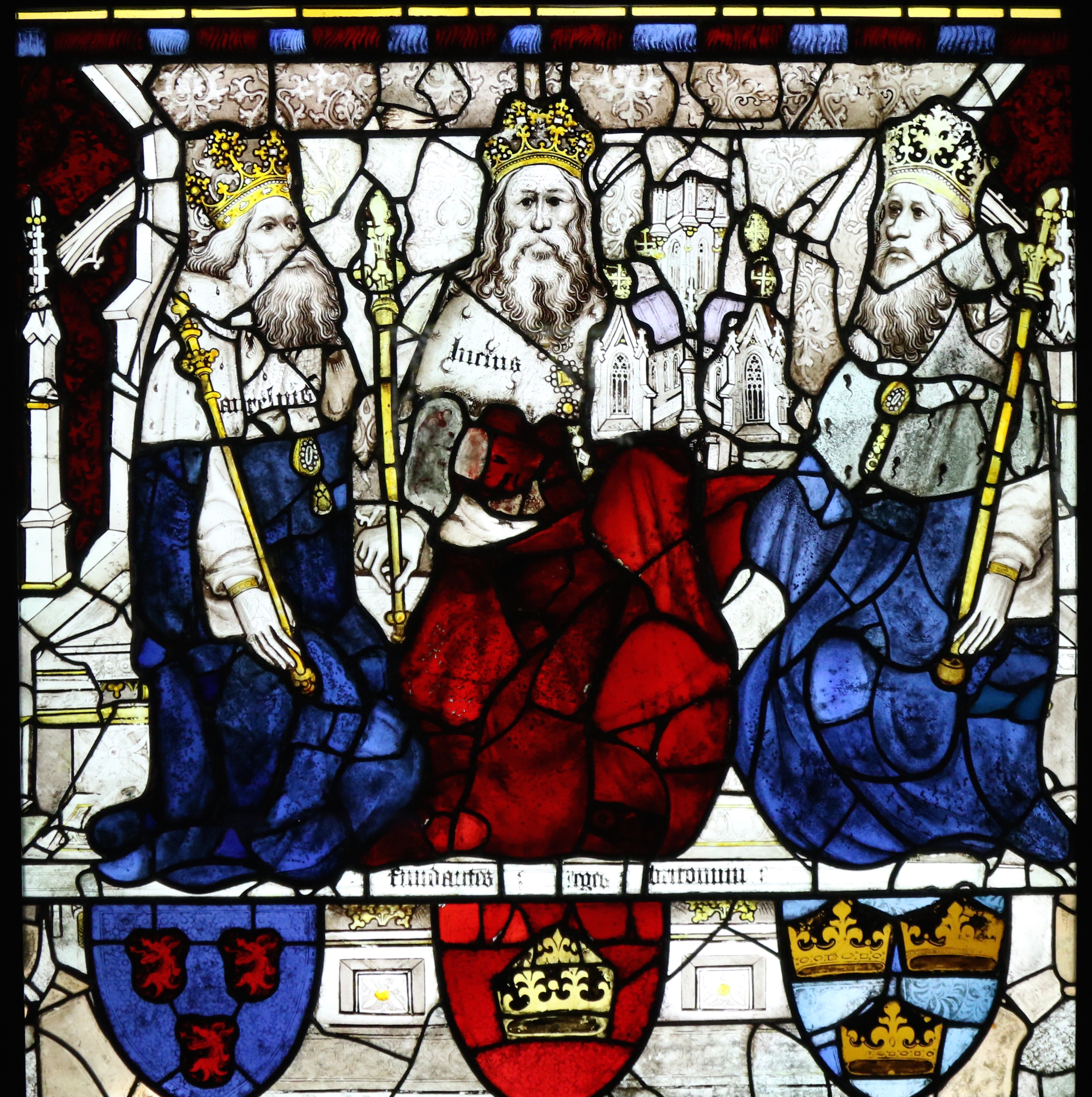
King Lucius (middle) from the East Window in York Minster

For centuries the story of this "first Christian king" was widely believed, especially in Britain, where it was considered an accurate account of Christianity among the early Britons. During the English Reformation, the Lucius story was used in polemics by both Catholics and Protestants; Catholics considered it evidence of papal supremacy from a very early date, while Protestants used it to bolster claims of the primacy of a British national church founded by the crown.

The English monk Bede included the Lucius story in his Ecclesiastical History of the English People, completed in 731. He may have heard it from a contemporary who had been to Rome, such as Nothhelm. Bede adds the detail that Lucius' new faith was thereafter adopted by his people, who maintained it until the Diocletianic Persecution. Following Bede, versions of the Lucius story appeared in Nennius's 9th-century Historia Brittonum, and in 12th-century works such as Geoffrey of Monmouth's Historia Regum Britanniae, William of Malmesbury's Gesta Pontificum Anglorum, and the Book of Llandaff. The most influential of these accounts was Geoffrey's, which emphasizes Lucius' virtues and gives a detailed, if fanciful, account of the spread of Christianity during his reign. In his version, Lucius is the son of the benevolent King Coilus and rules in the manner of his father. Hearing of the miracles and good works performed by Christian disciples, he writes to Pope Eleutherius asking for assistance in his conversion. Eleutherius sends two missionaries, Fuganus and Duvianus, who baptise the king and establish a successful Christian order throughout Britain. They convert the commoners and flamens, turn pagan temples into churches, and establish dioceses and archdioceses where the flamens had previously held power. The pope is pleased with their accomplishments, and Fuganus and Duvianus recruit another wave of missionaries to aid the cause. Lucius responds by granting land and privileges to the Church. He dies without heir in AD 156, thereby weakening Roman influence in Britain.

== Church of St Peter upon Cornhill ==
There is a long-standing tradition in London that St Peter upon Cornhill church was founded by King Lucius. Interestingly, the church altar is sited directly above the potential location of a pagan shrine room, of the great Roman London basilica.

Two other facts however, may give credence to a Roman past. The first is that London sent a bishop, Restitutus, to the Council of Arles in 314 AD. Restitutus must have had a church base. Secondly, in 1417, during a discussion about the order of precedence in a Whit Monday procession, the Mayor of London confirmed that St Peter's was the first church founded in London. Given that St Paul's Cathedral was founded in 604, this clearly implies that St Peter's was considered in 1417 to be founded pre-600.

=== King Lucius Tablet ===
The London historian John Stow, writing at the end of the 16th century, reported "there remaineth in this church a table whereon is written, I know not by what authority, but of a late hand, that King Lucius founded the same church to be an archbishop's see metropolitan, and chief church of his kingdom, and that it so endured for four hundred years". The "table" (tablet) seen by Stow was destroyed when the medieval church was burnt in the Great Fire of London, but before this time a number of writers had recorded what it said. The text of the original tablet as printed by John Weever in 1631 began:

Be hit known to al men, that the yeerys of our Lord God an clxxix [AD 179]. Lucius the fyrst christen kyng of this lond, then callyd Brytayne, fowndyd the fyrst chyrch in London, that is to sey, the Chyrch of Sent Peter apon Cornhyl, and he fowndyd ther an Archbishoppys See, and made that Chirch the Metropolitant, and cheef Chirch of this kingdom...

A replacement, in the form of an inscribed brass plate, was set up after the Great Fire and still hangs in the church vestry. The text of the brass plate has been printed several times, for example by George Godwin in 1839, and an engraving of it was included in Robert Wilkinson's Londina Illustrata (1819–25).

== Lucius of Chur ==
Lucius of Britain is sometimes identified with Lucius of Chur who was active in Switzerland. This is because Lucius of Chur was often referred to (in German language) as Adeliger der Pritanni ('nobleman of the Pritanni'). However, Pritanni here refers to tribe after which the Swiss region Prättigau was named, not to Britain.

== See also ==
- Lucius (play)

Legendary titles
Preceded by Coilus	King of Britain	Vacant Interregnum Title next held by Geta
