= List of governors of Roman Britain =

This is a partial list of governors of Roman Britain from 43 to 409. As the unified province "Britannia", Roman Britain was a consular province, meaning that its governors had to first serve as a consul in Rome before they could govern it. While this rank could be obtained either as a suffect or ordinarius, a number of governors were consules ordinarii, and also appear in the List of Early Imperial Roman Consuls. After Roman Britain was divided, first into two (early 3rd century), then into four (293), later governors could be of the lower, equestrian rank.

Not all the governors are recorded by Roman historians and many listed here are derived from epigraphic evidence or from sources such as the Vindolanda letters. Beyond the recall of Gnaeus Julius Agricola in 85 the dates of service of those who can be named can only be inferred. Others are still entirely anonymous and by the time of the division of Britain into separate provinces, the record is very patchy.

== Roman governors of Britannia ==
=== Claudian governors ===
- Aulus Plautius (43–47)
- Publius Ostorius Scapula (47–52)
- Aulus Didius Gallus (52–57)
- Quintus Veranius (57–57)
- Gaius Suetonius Paulinus (58–62)
- Publius Petronius Turpilianus (62–63)
- Marcus Trebellius Maximus (63–69)

=== Flavian governors ===
- Marcus Vettius Bolanus (69–71)
- Quintus Petillius Cerialis (71–74)
- Sextus Julius Frontinus (74–78), also a military and technical writer
- Gnaeus Julius Agricola (78–85), conqueror of Caledonia
- unknown
- Sallustius Lucullus (uncertain; 87 – c. 89)
- Aulus Vicirius Proculus (fl. 93)
- Publius Metilius Nepos (uncertain; c. 96 – c. 97)

=== Trajanic governors ===
- Titus Avidius Quietus (c. 97 – c. 101)
- Lucius Neratius Marcellus (c. 101 – c. 103)
- unknown (c. 103 – 115)
- Marcus Atilius Bradua (uncertain; 115–118)

=== Hadrianic governors ===
- Quintus Pompeius Falco (118–122)
- Aulus Platorius Nepos (122 – c. 125)
- Lucius Trebius Germanus (uncertain; c. 127)
- Sextus Julius Severus (c. 131 – c. 133)
- Publius Mummius Sisenna (uncertain; c. 133 – c. 135)

=== Antonine governors ===
- Quintus Lollius Urbicus (138 – 144)
- Gnaeus Papirius Aelianus (c. 145 – c. 147)
- unknown (c. 147 – c. 152)
- Titus Caesernius Statianus (c. 152/153)
- Gnaeus Julius Verus (c. 154 – c. 158)
- unknown (c. 158 – 161)
- Marcus Statius Priscus (c. 161)
- Sextus Calpurnius Agricola (c. 162 – c. 166)
- unknown (c. 166 – 175)
- Quintus Antistius Adventus (c. 175 – c. 178)
- Lucius Ulpius Marcellus(c. 178 – c. 180)
- anonymous (c. 180) this governor (στρατηγος) was killed in 180 when Caledonians breached the Hadrian Wall.
- Lucius Ulpius Marcellus (c. 180 – c. 184) the second tenure of Marcellus after the murder of the previous governor.
- Marcus Antius Crescens Calpurnianus (acting governor, c. 185)
- Publius Helvius Pertinax (c. 185 – c. 187), later Roman Emperor
- unknown (c. 187-91)
- Junius Severus (c. 192) Commodus, in 192, sent one of his aides (unum ex contubernalibus), Junius Severus, an equestrian, as governor of Britain to remove Albinus who made a speech against Commodus and in favor of the Senate.
- Decimus Clodius Albinus (c. 192 – c. 197), imperial usurper he became governor after the death of Commodus because he was supported by the Senate and by Laetus

=== Severan governors ===
- Virius Lupus (197 – c. 200)
- Pollienus Auspex (c. 201)
- Marcus Antius Crescens Calpurnianus (acting; c. 202)
- Gaius Valerius Pudens (c. 202 – c. 205)
- Lucius Alfenus Senecio (c. 205 – c. 207)
- Gaius Junius Faustinus Postumianus (c. 208 – c. 211)

Some sources list a further governor, a second Ulpius Marcellus. He was interpreted as a son of the first Ulpius Marcellus, serving. c. 211. This is based on a misdated inscription and it is now accepted that it refers to the earlier Ulpius Marcellus only.

The two sons of emperor Septimius Severus, Caracalla and Publius Septimius Geta, administered the province to some degree during and immediately after their father's campaigns there which took place between 208 and 211.

== Division into Britannia Superior and Inferior ==
This list assumes the final division occurred c. 213.

=== Britannia Superior ===
- Tiberius Julius Pollienus Auspex (sometime during c. 223 – 226)
- Gaius Junius Faustinus Postumianus (probably sometime during 222–235)
- Rufinus (probably early 3rd century)
- Marcus Martiannius Pulcher (3rd century)
- Titus Desticius Juba (253–255)

=== Britannia Inferior ===
- Gaius Julius Marcus (by 213)
- Marcus Antonius Gordianus (by 216)
- Modius Julius (by 219)
- Tiberius Claudius Paulinus (c. 220)
- Marius Valerianus (221 – 222/223)
- Claudius Xenophon (223)
- Maximus (by 225)
- Claudius Apellinus (sometime during 222–235)
- Calvisius Rufus (sometime during 222–235)
- Valerius Crescens Fulvianus (sometime during 222–235)
- Tuccianus (by 237)
- Maecilius Fuscus (sometime during 238–244)
- Egnatius Lucillianus (sometime during 238–244)
- Nonius Philippus (by 242)
- Octavius Sabinus (sometime during 260–269), under the Gallic Empire

== Diocese of the Britains ==
Following the reabsorption of Britain into the Roman Empire, the island was further repartitioned by Diocletian, this time into four separate provinces, Maxima Caesariensis in the southeast, with its capital at London, Flavia Caesariensis in the east, with its capital at Lincoln, Britannia Secunda in the north, with its capital at York, and Britannia Prima in the west (including present day Wales), with its capital at Cirencester. A fifth province called Valentia also briefly existed, probably in the far north. Each had a governor of equestrian rank (a praeses) and they were overseen by a vicarius. Later in the 4th century, the governor of Maxima Caesariensis had to be of consular rank. The following names are the few which have survived from this era, covering the almost 100 years until c. 408, when the Roman civilian administration was expelled by the native population.

=== Vicarii ===
- Pacatianus (c. 319)
- Flavius Martinus (c. 353)
- Alypius of Antioch (361–363, soon after Flavius Martinus)
- Civilis (369)
- Victorinus (probably sometime during 395–406)
- Chrysanthus (probably sometime during 395–406)

=== Governors ===
- Aurelius Arpagius (possibly Britannia Secunda; sometime during 296–305)
- Flavius Sanctus (mid-4th century)
- Lucius Septimius (Britannia Prima, date unknown)

== Other rulers in Roman Britain ==
=== Usurpers and British-based rulers of the Western Empire ===
- In c. 278, an unknown governor rebelled but was quickly defeated
- Carausius (286–293), British-based usurper emperor
- Allectus (293–296), Carausius' successor
- Magnentius (350–353), rebel emperor of much of Western Europe
- Another Carausius, dubbed by historians Carausius II, may have attempted usurpation sometime between 354 and 358
- Magnus Maximus (383–388) recognised as emperor of the west by Theodosius I
- Marcus (406), proclaimed emperor by the Army of Britain
- Gratian (407), British-based emperor
- Constantine III, a British soldier who became a usurper in the West

=== Native rulers ===
- Roman client kingdoms in Britain
- Iron Age tribes in Britain

=== Military leaders ===
- Dux Britanniarum
- Comes Britanniarum
- Count of the Saxon Shore

== See also ==
- Lists of ancient Roman governors
