= Viria gens =

Ancient Roman family

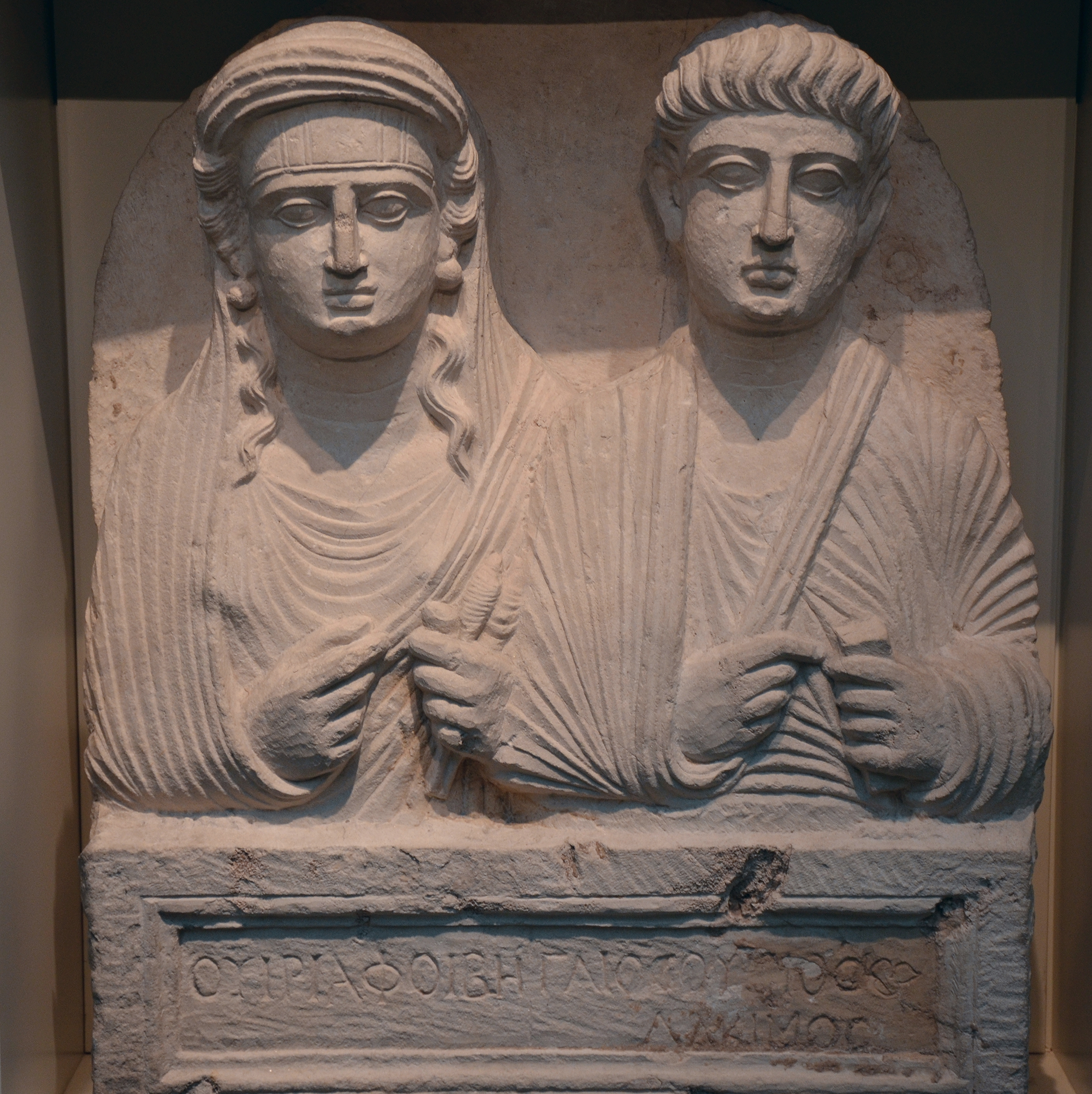
Palmyrene funerary bust of Viria Phoebe and Gaius Virius Alcimus, first century.

The gens Viria was a Roman family of the second and third centuries, possibly of northern Italian origin. The first member to ascend the cursus honorum was Virius Lupus, who attained the consulship in the late second century. It is possible that the family was elevated to patrician status around that time. The family's influence reached its apex during the third century.

== Members ==
- Viria Acte, a first-century Hispano-Roman businesswoman.
- Gaius Virius Alcimus, along with Titus Statilius Hermes, built a first-century sepulchre at Palmyra, for themselves and their families, with a dedicatory inscription dating from AD 56 or 57. His wife, Viria Phoebe, appears with him in a funerary bust.
- Viria Phoebe, the wife of Gaius Virius Alcimus, was a first-century Palmyrene woman.
- Virius Lupus, consul suffectus some time before AD 196, was legatus Augusti pro praetore of Germania Inferior circa 196, and Governor of Britannia in 197.
- Lucius Virius Agricola, consul in AD 230.
- Lucius Virius Lupus Julianus, consul ordinarius in AD 232, and subsequently governor of Coele Syria, had risen from the posts of cavalry commander and triumvir of prisons, and served as governor of Lycia et Pamphylia prior to his consulship.
- Virius Orfitus, consul in AD 270, and praefectus urbi in 273 or 274.
- Virius Lupus, consul suffectus sometime before AD 275, and consul ordinarius in 278, had been governor of Caelimontium, curator of Laurentum, and praeses of Coele Syria, subsequently becoming governor of that province in the 260s. He also served as governor of Asia, iudex sacrarum cognition of Egypt, and a priest of dei solis.
- Quintus Virius Fonteius Nepotianus, a senator buried at Rome, in a tomb dating from the middle or latter part of the third century.
- Virius Gallus, consul in AD 298.
- Virius Nepotianus, consul in AD 301.
- Virius Nepotianus, consul in AD 336, married Eutropia, the sister of Constantine the Great. Father of the usurper Nepotianus.
- Flavius Julius Popilius Nepotianus Constantinus, better known as Nepotianus or Nepotian, a nephew of Constantine, proclaimed himself emperor in AD 350, but was soon slain.
- Virius Nicomachus Flavianus, consul in AD 394.
- Virius Nicomachus Flavianus, praefectus urbi in AD 408.

== See also ==
- List of Roman gentes

== Bibliography ==
- Dictionary of Greek and Roman Biography and Mythology, William Smith, ed., Little, Brown and Company, Boston (1849).
- René Cagnat et alii, L'Année épigraphique (The Year in Epigraphy, abbreviated AE), Presses Universitaires de France (1888–present).
- A. H. M. Jones & J. R. Martindale, eds., The Prosopography of the Later Roman Empire (abbreviated PLRE), Cambridge University Press (1971–1992).
- Inge Mennen, Power and Status in the Roman Empire, AD 193–284, Brill (2011).
