= Xenophon (disambiguation) =

Xenophon was a Greek soldier, historian and philosopher in the 4th century BC.

Xenophon may also refer to:

== People ==
=== Other ancient people ===
- Xenophon of Corinth, an Olympic runner in 464 BC
- Xenophon (son of Euripides), an Athenian general in the 430s BC
- Xenophon of Aegium, the name of two Olympic athletes from the same Greek city, victorious in 380 BC and 60 BC
- Xenophon of Lampsacus, a Greek geographer from the 2nd century BC of Lampsacus
- Gaius Stertinius Xenophon, a Roman physician (c. 10 BC–54 AD)
- Xenophon of Ephesus, a Greek writer from the 2nd or 3rd century AD
- Claudius Xenophon, a Roman governor in Britain in the 3rd century AD

=== Modern people with the name ===
==== Given name ====
- Dana Xenophon Bible (1891–1980), American football player and coach
- Xenophon, founder and first abbot of the Xenophontos Monastery
- Xenophon of Robeika (fl. late 14th–early 15th centuries), venerable Russian monk
- Xenophon Balaskas (1910–1994), South African cricketer
- Xenophon Hicks (1872–1952) United States Circuit Judge
- Xenophon Huddy (1876–1943), Automotive Law Specialist
- Xenophon Jacob Pindall (1835–1905), lawyer, state legislator, and judge in Arkansas
- Xenophon Overton Pindall (1873–1935), governor of Arkansas
- Xenophon P. Wilfley (1871–1931), Missouri politician
- Xenophon Zolotas (1904–2004), Greek economist

==== Surname ====
- Nick Xenophon (born 1959), Australian politician

== Astronomical features ==
- Xenophon (crater), a small lunar crater
- 5986 Xenophon, a main-belt asteroid

== Literature ==
- Xenophon (book), 1974 history book by John Kinloch Anderson
