= Caerellia gens =

The gens Caerellia was a minor plebeian family during the late Roman Republic and in imperial times. Few members of this gens occur in history. Caerellia was a learned and wealthy friend of Cicero. Various Caerellii are known from epigraphy, including Caerellius Priscus, governor of Roman Britain in the late second century.

== Members ==
- Caerellia, a wealthy contemporary of Cicero, whose philosophical writings she studied, and with whom she became intimately acquainted. Quintus Fufius Calenus accused them of having carried on an affair.
- Caerellius Priscus, governor of various provinces, including Britain, was consul suffectus around AD 172.
- Gaius Caerellius Sabinus, legate of the Legio XIII Gemina, according to an inscription from Apulum in Dacia, dating between AD 183 and 185.

== See also ==
- List of Roman gentes

== Bibliography ==
- Marcus Tullius Cicero, Epistulae ad Atticum, Epistulae ad Familiares.
- Marcus Fabius Quintilianus (Quintilian), Institutio Oratoria (Institutes of Oratory).
- Lucius Cassius Dio, Roman History.
- Dictionary of Greek and Roman Biography and Mythology, William Smith, ed., Little, Brown and Company, Boston (1849).
- Theodor Mommsen et alii, Corpus Inscriptionum Latinarum (The Body of Latin Inscriptions, abbreviated CIL), Berlin-Brandenburgische Akademie der Wissenschaften (1853–present).
