= Caerellius Priscus =

Caerellius Priscus is the name given to the man on an inscription recovered at Mogontiacum (Mainz), set up by a governor of Germania Superior who was afterwards governor of Roman Britain in the late 170s.

The name of his son in the inscription implies that his gentilicium was "Caerellius", which is how Anthony Birley refers to him. Edmund Groag suggested the dedicant might be Asellius Aemilianus proconsul of 192–193, but Birley disagrees. Birley also admits "Caerellius" might be identical with Gaius Caerellius Sabinus, legate of Legio XIII Gemina and afterwards governor of Raetia, but finds several objections to this, most notably that Sabinus' wife was Fufidia Pollitta and the wife of the man in this inscription was named Modestiana. Birley concludes by stating the "most likely" identification of "Caerellius" is with Caerellius Priscus, praetor tutelaris under Marcus Aurelius and Lucius Verus, between the years 161 through 169. This is the same identification that Géza Alföldy makes.

== Career ==
The Mainz inscription lists the provinces Caerellius was governor of in a problematic order: Thracia, Moesia Superior, Raetia, Germania Superior then Britain. According to Birley, Raetia, typically a province governed by an ex-praetor, is out of place "between two consular provinces". Although Birley argues that Moesia Superior might have been downgraded to praetorian status, it is possible these provinces were not listed in chronological order. Alföldy, following Birley, provides the following dates for Caerellius' governorships: Thracia c. 167 - c. 170, Moesia Superior c. 170 - c. 172, suffect consul around 172, Germania Superior c. 174 - c. 177, and likely governor of Roman Britain c. 177–180.

Dio Cassius notes that at the beginning of Commodus' sole rule, "tribes" crossed the Antonine Wall and defeated a general (στρατηγόν) and his soldiers in Britain. Birley admits there is some disagreement whether by "general" Dio means a legionary legate or provincial governor, but argues that Dio consistently uses that word to indicate a governor. Although it would appear the governor slain was Caerellius, Birley argues that "he was one of the low-quality governors appointed by Commodus soon after his ascension, rather than ... an experienced commander such as 'Caerellius'." In response to this disaster, the Praetorian prefect Tigidius Perennis immediately sent Ulpius Marcellus to replace him, who proceeded to ruthlessly crush the rebellion.

If Caerellius was not the governor killed in battle, he nevertheless vanishes from history after concluding his term as governor of Britain.

== Family ==
The Mainz inscription attests Caerellius had a wife, Modestiana, a daughter, Germanilla, and a son, Marcianus. Birley suggests Marcianus may be identified with a C(a)erellius Macrinus the Historia Augusta (Severus 13.6) listed as executed by order of the Emperor Septimius Severus, presumably because he had supported his rival Clodius Albinus. Birley also admits Caerellius was likely a kinsman to the above-mentioned Sabinus.

== See also ==
- Caerellia (gens)

Political offices
Preceded by Quintus Antistius Adventus	Roman governors of Britain c. 177 - c. 180	Succeeded by Ulpius Marcellus ?
