= Chrysanthos =

Chrysanthos (Greek: Χρύσανθος), Latinized as Chrysanthus, is a Greek name meaning "golden flower". The feminine form of the name is Chrysanthe (Χρυσάνθη), also written Chrysanthi, Chrysanthy and Chrysanthea.

Notable people bearing this name include:

- Saint Chrysanthus, 3rd-century Christian martyr
- Chrysanthus (vicarius), Roman governor of Britain at the turn of the 4th century and bishop
- Chrysanthus of Jerusalem (1655/1660–1731), Greek Orthodox Patriarch of Jerusalem
- Chrysanthus of Constantinople (1768–1834), Ecumenical Patriarch of Constantinople
- Chrysanthos of Madytos (c. 1770 – c. 1840), Greek musicologist
- Chrysanthos Sisinis (died 1845), participated in the Greek War of Independence
- Chrysanthos Sisinis (general), Greek general
- Chrysanthus of Athens (1881–1949), Archbishop of Greece
- Father Chrysanthus (1905–1972), Dutch priest and arachnologist
- Chrysanthos Mentis Bostantzoglou (1918–1995), better known as Bost, Greek political cartoonist and playwright
- Chrysanthos Theodoridis, (1934–2005), Pontic Greek singer and songwriter
