= Virius Lupus =

Late 2nd century Roman soldier and governor

Governor of Britannia
- In office 197 – 201 or 202
- Preceded by: Decimus Clodius Albinus
- Succeeded by: Marcus Antius Crescens Calpurnianus

Legatus Augusti pro praetore at Germania Inferior

Suffect Consul of Imperial Rome

Personal details
- Born: c. 160
- Died: after 205
- Relations: Quintus Virius Egnatius Sulpicius Priscus (possible relation)
- Children: Lucius Virius Agricola, Lucius Virius Lupus Iulianus (assumed)
- Profession: Soldier, Politician

Virius Lupus (c. 160 – after 205) (possibly Lucius Virius Lupus) was a Roman soldier and politician of the late 2nd and early 3rd century.

== Biography ==
Virius Lupus was the first member of the gens Virii to attain high office in the Roman Empire. His early career is unknown, but prior to 196, he would have been appointed as consul suffectus. He is first attested as serving as Legatus Augusti pro praetore at Germania Inferior, and supported Septimius Severus during the civil war that followed the murder of Pertinax. In 196 his troops were defeated by Decimus Clodius Albinus as the fight for the throne intensified.

After Severus' victory in the civil wars, Virius was appointed Governor of Britannia in 197. Severus sent him to Britain immediately to recover the province from the rebellions that had swept it following Clodius Albinus' removal of most of the garrison to press his claim for the throne the previous year.

In the north he was obliged to buy peace from the Maeatae. Fearful that they would ally with the Caledonian Confederacy and unable to secure troop reinforcements from Severus, Lupus had no choice but to pay the rebels in return for their withdrawal and the return of a few prisoners. Lupus slowly restored the forts in the Pennines to Roman control although Hadrian's Wall was not rebuilt until c. 205.

His governorship was assisted by the arrival of Sextus Varius Marcellus as provincial procurator and in who can be seen the germ of the later division of Britain into two provinces. He served as governor until 201 or 202.

It is assumed that Virius was the father of Lucius Virius Agricola, consul ordinarius in 230, and of Lucius Virius Lupus Iulianus, consul ordinarius in 232. He may have been related to Quintus Virius Egnatius Sulpicius Priscus, who appears to have been a suffect consul either during the reign of Septimius Severus or Caracalla

== See also ==
- List of Roman governors of Britain

== Sources ==
- Collingwood, Robin George (1936). Roman Britain and the English Settlements. Biblo & Tannen Publishers. p. 157. ISBN 0-8196-1160-3.
- Mennen, Inge (2011). Power and Status in the Roman Empire, AD 193-284. Brill Academic Publishers. pp. 130-133.
- Degraft-Johnson, J. C. (1986). African Glory. Black Classic Press. p. 33. ISBN 0-933121-03-2.
- Blois, Lukas “de” (1976). The Policy of the Emperor Galienus. Brill Academic Publishers. p. 77. ISBN 90-04-04508-2.

Political offices
Preceded by Decimus Clodius Albinus	Roman governors of Britain	Succeeded by Marcus Antius Crescens Calpurnianus
