= Alypius of Antioch =

Alypius of Antioch was a geographer and a vicarius of Roman Britain, probably in the late 350s AD. He replaced Flavius Martinus as vicarius after the latter's suicide. Alypius' rule is recorded in Ammianus XXIII 1, 3.

== Life ==
He came from Antioch and served under Constantius II and was probably appointed to ensure that nobody with western associations was serving in Britain during a time of mistrust, rebellion and suppression symbolised by the brutal acts of the imperial notary Paulus Catena. He may have had to deal with the insurrection of the usurper named Carausius II.

Alypius was afterwards commissioned to rebuild the Temple in Jerusalem as part of Julian's systematic attempt to reverse the Christianization of the Roman Empire by restoring pagan or, in this case, Jewish practices. Among the letters of Julian are two (29 and 30) addressed to Alypius; one inviting him to Rome, the other thanking him for a geographical treatise, which no longer exists.

== Sources ==
- Todd, M., Roman Britain, Fontana, London 1985
- Salway, P., Roman Britain, Oxford, 1986
