= Gaius Valerius Pudens =

Late 2nd/early 3rd century Roman official and general

Gaius Valerius Pudens was a Roman Senator who was a suffect consul and held at least three imperial appointments during the late 2nd - early 3rd centuries. His career is known almost entirely from inscriptions in the four provinces he is known to have governed.

Valerius Pudens was a native of Cuicul, now Djémila. His earliest attested post was governor of Pannonia Inferior in April 193, then his consulship either in the later part of 193 or in 194, before becoming governor of Germania Inferior at some point between 197 and 200.

After his tenure as governor in Lower Germany, he was appointed governor of Roman Britain. An inscription at Bainbridge fort records new barracks being built under his governorship, possibly in connection with recent uprisings by the Brigantes, and attests his presence there in 205. Birley believes he was the predecessor of Lucius Alfenus Senecio, but admits the evidence equally supports Pudens as Senecio's successor.

Pudens is last heard of as proconsul of Africa in 211/212. While proconsul, according to Tertullian, he refused to hear a case against a Christian "perceiving from the indictment that it was a case of vexatious accusation; tearing the document in pieces, he refused so much as to hear him without the presence of his accuser, as not being consistent with the imperial commands."

== See also ==
- Passion of Saint Perpetua, Saint Felicitas, and their Companions

== Notes ==
Political offices
Preceded by Marcus Antius Crescens Calpurnianus	Roman governors of Britain c. 205	Succeeded by Lucius Alfenus Senecio
