= Titus Caesernius Statianus =

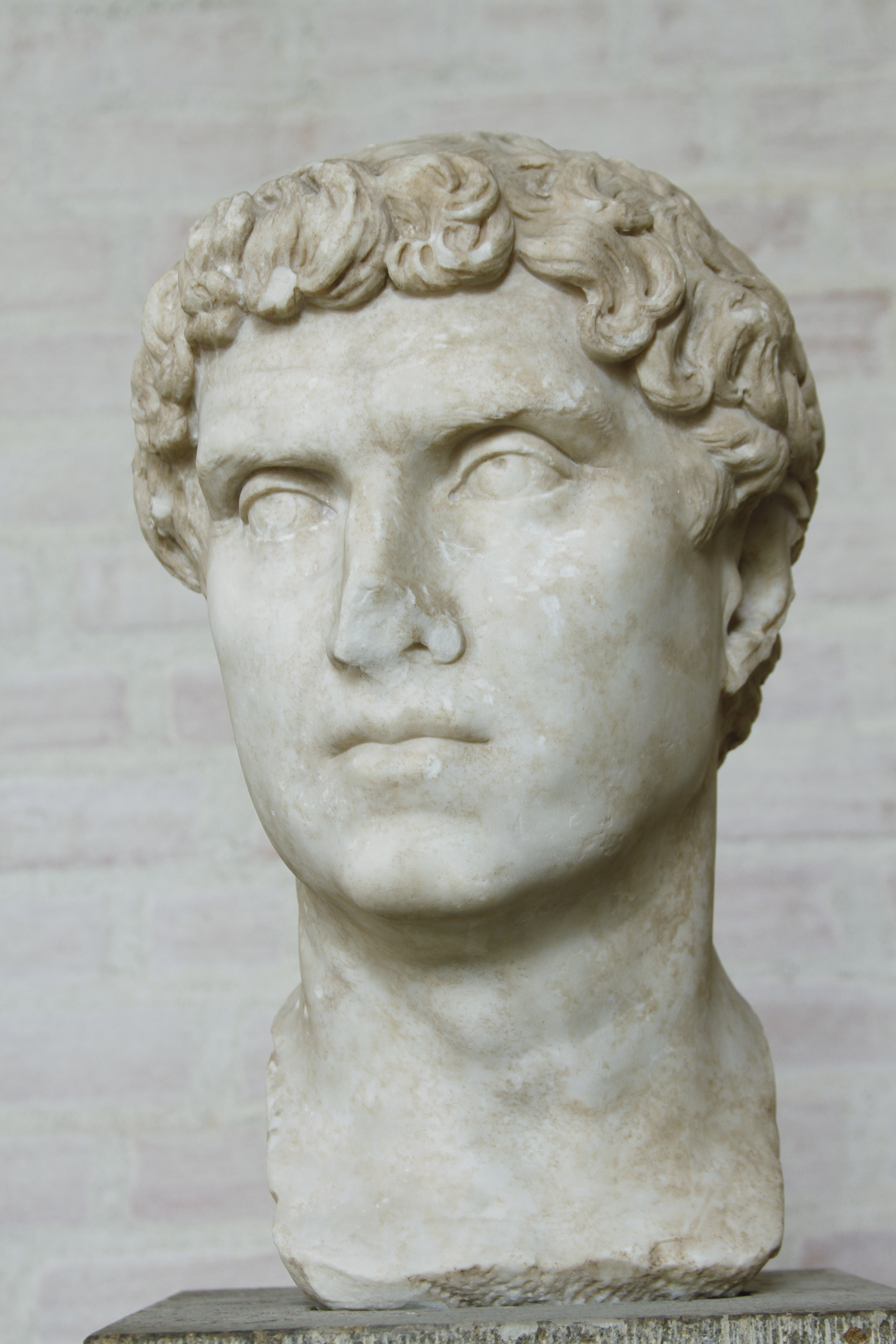
- Bust of Statianus (The Glyptothek, Munich)

Suffect Consul of the Roman Empire
- In office c. 141 AD – c. 141 AD
- Preceded by: Publius Cornelius Dolabella; Lucius Anbaues Seneca the Younger
- Succeeded by: T. (or P.?) Palfuriu

Governor of Roman Britain
- In office c. 152 AD – c. 153 AD
- Preceded by: unknown
- Succeeded by: Gnaeus Julius Verus

Personal details
- Born: Titus Caesernius Statius Quinctius Statianus Memmius Macrinus c. 2st century AD Aquileia, Italy, Roman Empire
- Died: c. 2st century AD
- Occupation: Ancient Roman politician

Titus Caesernius Statianus was a Roman senator who held a number of appointments in the Imperial service during the reigns of Hadrian and Antoninus Pius. He was suffect consul in a nundinium in 141. His full name is Titus Caesernius Statius Quinctius Statianus Memmius Macrinus.

Statianus was the younger son of the procurator Titus Caesernius Statius Quinctius Macedo; the name of his older brother is Titus Caesernius Quinctianus, suffect consul in a nundinium around the year 138. The Caesernii were a leading family of Aquileia.

== Life ==
His cursus honorum up to his consulate is known from the dedication to a statue set up at Cirta in the imperial province of Numidia. The first office Statianus held was in the decemviri stlitibus judicandis, one of the four boards that formed the vigintiviri; membership in one of these four boards was a preliminary and required first step toward a gaining entry into the Roman Senate. Next he was comes Augusti in Oriente, or a companion of the emperor Hadrian during his tour of the eastern provinces around the year 129. His service near the emperor led to his service as quaestor as a candidate of the emperor, a prestigious honor that his brother had enjoyed before him. Upon completion of this traditional Republican magistracy Statianus would be enrolled in the Senate. He held the Republican magistracy of plebeian tribune, which was followed by the special assignment to recruit soldiers in Transpadane Italy (missus ad dilec[tu]m juniorum a Divo Hadriano in regionem Transpadanam). Anthony Birley explains this assignment was to replace losses the Romans experienced in the concurrent war in Judea. Statianus then returned to Rome where he held the magistracy of praetor; Géza Alföldy dates his tenure as around the year 135.

After he concluded his duties as praetor, Statianus was commissioned legatus legionis or commander of Legio XIV Gemina, which at that time was stationed at Carnuntum in Pannonia Superior; Alföldy dates his service around the period from the year 136 to 138. Then he was appointed the emperor's legatus in Africa. This language reflects his actual role in North Africa: his appointment made him the commander of Legio III Augusta, which was stationed at Lambaesis, which although technically made him commander of another legion, this in fact made him governor of a stretch of Roman territory adjacent to the Roman province of Africa modern scholars refer to as Numidia. Alföldy dates his tenure in Roman Numidia from around the year 138 to 141, covering the date of Hadrian's death and the succession of Antoninus Pius. During that time he became the patron of the cities of Cirta and Timgad, and it was at that time a statue was erected in his honor at Cirta. Since upon holding this post a senator most often immediately acceded to the consulate, as was the case with Statianus, he was likely admitted to the Roman priesthood of the sodales Augustales prior to being sent to command the III Augusta.

We know of two more appointments for Statianus after his consulate. An inscription found at Pontailler-sur-Saone attests to his appointment as governor of Germania Superior; Alföldy dates his tenure from around 149 to 152. A recently published military diploma dated to 152/153 attests that he was governor of Roman Britain at that time. How much longer Statianus lived after returning to Rome from Britain is unknown. Alföldy dates his birth around the year 105, which would make him 48 when he left that province; based on what we know of Roman demographics, it is possible that Statianus lived about fifteen more years.

Preceded by Unknown	Roman governors of Britain	Succeeded by Gnaeus Julius Verus
