= Gnaeus Julius Verus =

Roman senator, general and governor (died 179)

Gnaeus Julius Verus was Roman senator and general of the mid-2nd century AD. He was suffect consul, and governed several important imperial provinces: Germania Inferior, Britain, and Syria.

== Life ==
Verus came from Aequum in Dalmatia; this has led some experts (such as Géza Alföldy. Anthony Birley, and Werner Eck) to believe he was the son of Sextus Julius Severus (consul 127), but other experts assert Julius Severus was his uncle. He served as tribune in the legio X Fretensis when Julius Severus was governor of Judaea from 132 to 135. That Verus served as a tresvir monetalis, then quaestor Augusti, and was co-opted as an augur; all suggesting that he was marked out at an early stage for a prominent career.

Following his achievement as praetor, Verus was legatus legionis or commander of Legio XXX Ulpia Victrix in the 140s, which was stationed at Xanten then part of Germania Inferior. He returned to Rome to serve as prefect of the aerarium Saturni; Mireille Corbier dates his tenure from January 147 to the end of 149, which would make him the colleague of Lucius Dasumius Tullius Tuscus (suffect consul 152). Verus was suffect consul at some point in the years 149 to 151.

The first consular office Verus held was as governor of Germania Inferior, possibly arriving there in 154. Birley notes that "Verus' dispatch to govern a province where he had commanded a legion a decade or so earlier is relatively unusual."

An inscription from Birrens, north of the western end of Hadrian's Wall, shows that Verus was present in Britain as governor in 158, but he likely was present in the province before then. His dispatch to Britain with troops from Germany was probably meant to put down a revolt there, or at least to reinforce the remnants of the troops who had done so. The revolt had been led by the Brigantes tribe and had resulted in the abandonment of the Antonine Wall and a possible slaughter at the fort at Newstead.

It is not clear when Verus left Britain. Details on his successor are few. Verus is known to have accompanied Lucius Verus east in his campaign against the Parthians in 162, and a mile post in Syria dated to 163 shows he succeeded Marcus Annius Libo as governor upon the latter's death. In Syria, he instructed road improvements along the gorge of the Barada River, as documented by inscriptions from Abila Lysaniou.

His offices after he left Syria are not known. Dąbrowa notes Verus "was an experienced man who had good relationship with the emperors." Birley admits it is possible he was proconsular governor of Africa 20 years after his consulship, since the plague of 166 had slain so many qualified men. Verus was nominated for a second consulship in 180, but he died in 179.

Preceded by Titus Caesernius Statianus	Roman governors of Britain	Succeeded by Unknown
