= Ulpius Marcellus (son) =

Possible son of Ulpius Marcellus, governor of Britannia

Ulpius Marcellus (fl. 211–212) was formerly thought to be the latest-recorded governor of Britannia, before it was divided into separate provinces. He was supposed to be the son of Ulpius Marcellus, governor of Britannia during the reign of Commodus. Older sources, such as Roman Britain, by Peter Salway, still list him as a separate person, whilst later authorities now list Lucius Alfenus Senecio as the last known governor.

The theory that there was a second Ulpius Marcellus was based on two inscriptions at the fort at Cilurnum, which mention this name in connection with the second ala of Asturians. The arrival of the Asturians was previously thought to date to the early 3rd century. Their arrival is now placed in the later 2nd century, and the inscription is therefore believed to refer to the earlier governor.

== See also ==
- Ulpia (gens)
