= Marcus Antius Crescens Calpurnianus =

Marcus Antius Crescens Calpurnianus was a Roman senator, who held several offices, including acting governor of Roman Britain in the late second century AD, and as one of the quindecimviri sacris faciundis present at the Secular Games of 204.

An approximate chronology of his career can be established. Two inscriptions found in Ostia attest to Calpurnianus present in that city as pontifex Volcani in the years 194 and 195. A fragmentary inscription from Rome attests that after serving as praetor he officially served as juridicus in Britain when he had to replace an unnamed consular, then after his election to the quindecimviri sacris faciundis the sortition awarded him the office of proconsular governor of Macedonia. Birley notes that most experts date Calpurnianus' tenure as acting governor to about 200 "on the death or sudden disappearance of Virius Lupus." However, there is no firm basis to presume he was elected to the quindecimviri in 204, nor that the two offices of juridicus and proconsul fell close to that year; the duty of acting governor may have fallen on his shoulders when a governor of the province was killed in battle in the far north of the province. Birley lists two or three other incidents around 185 when the legions in Britain attempted to make different legionary commanders emperor. "Further evidence will be needed before this dating of Calpurnianus' acting governorship can be regarded as definite," Birley concludes

Little more is known of Calpurnianus. Birley speculates that he "preferred to devote himself to his private or local concerns, for example at Ostia, which was presumably his home." Birley also notes the existence of Marcus Antius Gratillianus, quaestor of Sicily in 213, and suggests Gratillianus could be Calpurnianus' son.

== See also ==
- Antia (gens)

Political offices
| Preceded by Virius Lupus | Roman governors of Britain | Succeeded by Gaius Valerius Pudens |
