= Djémila =

Archaeological site in Algeria

- Cuicul
- Roman Theatre of Djémila

- Location within Algeria
- 36°19′N 5°44′E
- Type: Settlement
- Periods: Roman Empire
- Location: Sétif Province, Algeria

History
- Built: 1st century AD
- Abandoned: 6th century AD

UNESCO World Heritage Site
- Official name: Cuicul-Djémila
- Type: Cultural
- Criteria: iii, iv
- Designated: 1982 (6th session)
- Reference no.: 191
- Region: Arab States

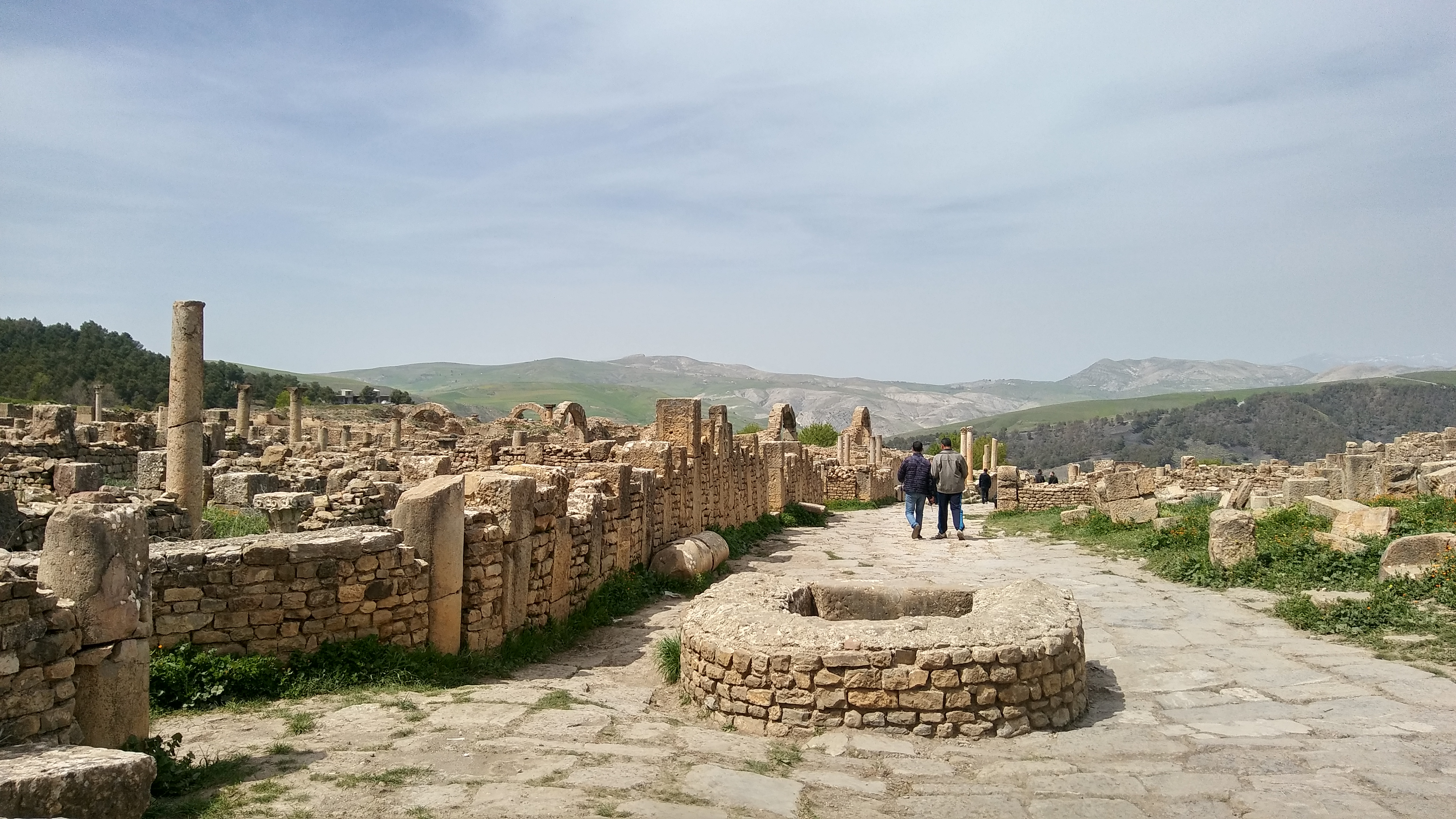
The Historical Market

Djémila (Arabic: جميلة, romanized: Ǧamīlah, lit. 'Beautiful (one)'), formerly Cuicul, is a small mountain village in Algeria, near the northern coast east of Algiers, where some of the best preserved Roman ruins in North Africa are found. It is in the region bordering the Constantinois and Petite Kabylie (Basse Kabylie).

In 1982 Djémila became a UNESCO World Heritage Site for its unique adaptation of Roman architecture to a mountain environment. Significant buildings in ancient Cuicul include a theatre, two fora, temples, basilicas, arches, streets, and houses. The exceptionally well preserved ruins surround the forum of the Harsh, a large paved square with an entry marked by an arch.

== Roman Cuicul ==
Under the name of Cuicul, the city was built 900 metres (3,000 ft) above sea level during the 1st century AD as a Roman military garrison situated on a narrow triangular plateau in the province of Numidia. The terrain is somewhat rugged, being located at the confluence of two rivers.

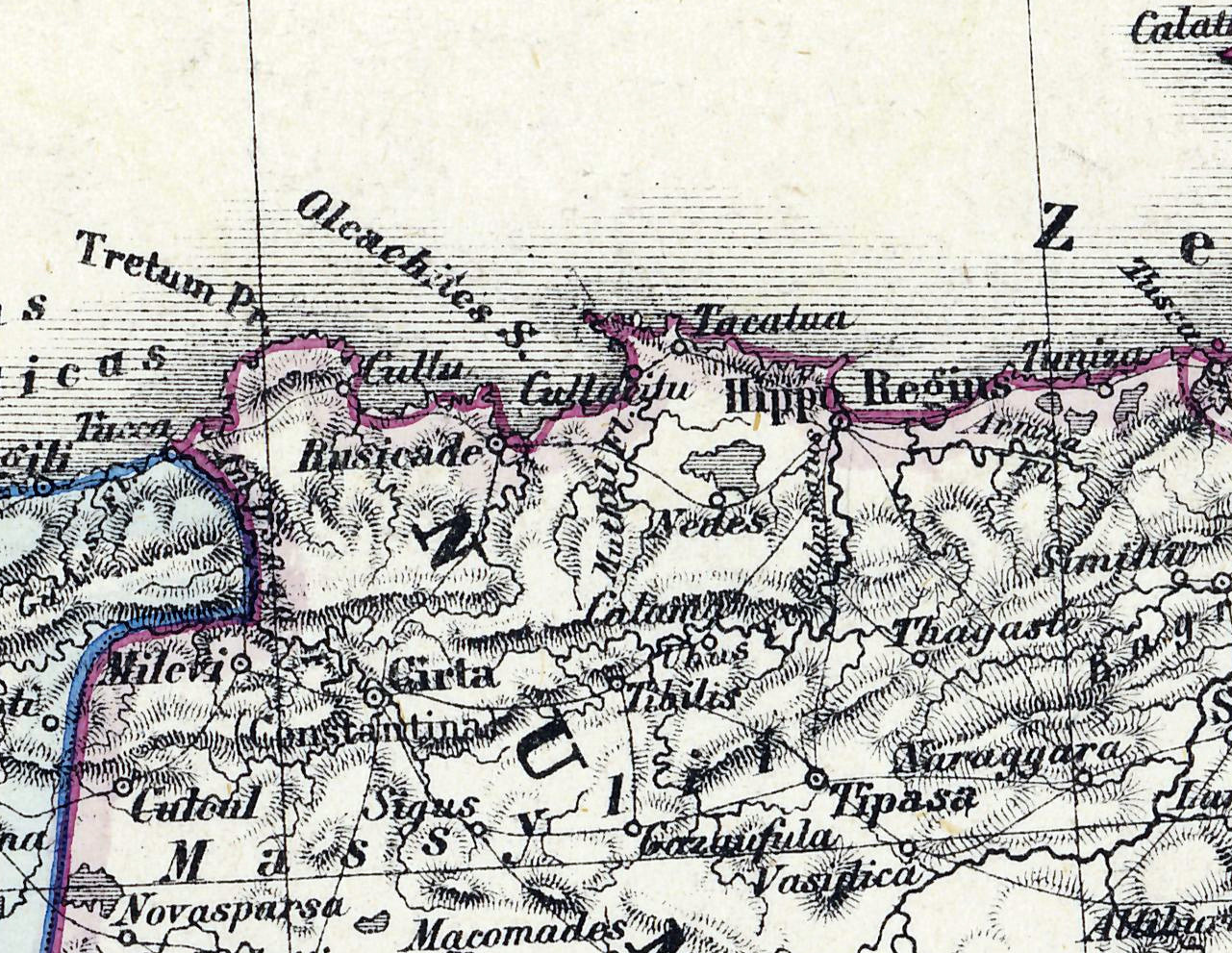
Cuicul on the map of Numidia, just south of Milevium and Cirta.Atlas Antiquus, H. Kiepert, 1869

Cuicul's builders followed a standard plan with a forum at the center and two main streets, the Cardo Maximus and the Decumanus Maximus, composing the major axes. The city was initially populated by a colony of Roman soldiers from Italy, and eventually grew to become a large trading market. The resources that contributed to the prosperity of the city were essentially agricultural (cereals, olive trees and farm).

During the reign of Caracalla in the 3rd century, Cuicul's administrators took down some of the old ramparts and constructed a new forum. They surrounded it with larger and more impressive edifices than those that bordered the old forum. The terrain hindered building, so that they built the theatre outside the town walls, which was exceptional.

In late antiquity, Cuicul was situated within the Roman province of Mauretania Sitifensis, and had an estimated population of around 10,000. Christianity became very popular in the 4th century (after some persecutions in the early third century), and by the fifth century, an ecclesiastical quarter was built, including three basilicas, a baptistery, auxiliary rooms, a bath, and a peristyle house. These structures are located to the south of Cuicul in a quarter called "Christian", and are popular attractions.

Of the bishops of Cuicul, Pudentianus took part in the Council of Carthage (255) concerning the validity of heretical baptism, and Elpidophorus in the Council of Carthage (348). Cresconius was the Catholic bishop who represented Cuicul at the Council of Carthage (411) between Catholic and Donatist bishops; the Donatist bishop of the town died before the conference began. Crescens was one of the Catholic bishops whom the Arian Vandal king Huneric summoned to Carthage in 484. Victor was at the Second Council of Constantinople in 553. No longer a residential bishopric, Cuicul is today listed by the Catholic Church as a titular see.

The city was slowly abandoned after the fall of the Roman Empire around the 5th century and 6th century. There were some improvements under emperor Justinian I, with wall reinforcements.

When Muslims later dominated the region they did not reoccupy the site of Cuicul, which they renamed Djémila ("beautiful" in Arabic).

== 3D documentation ==
The spatial documentation of Djémila took place during two Zamani Project field campaigns in 2009, which were undertaken in co-operation with Prof Hamza Zeghlache and his team from the University of Setif, Algeria, as well as the South African National Research Foundation (NRF). Several structures were documented, including the Baptistry, the Caracalla Gate, the Market, the Septimius-servus Temple and the Theatre.

== Notable residents ==
Several significant Romanized Africans were born in Cuicul:

- Lucius Alfenus Senecio: governor of Britannia (205 to 207).
- Gaius Valerius Pudens: governor of Britannia.
- Tiberius Claudius Subatianus Aquila: governor of Mesopotamia and Egypt.
- Tiberius Claudius Subatianus Proculus: governor of Numidia.

== Gallery ==
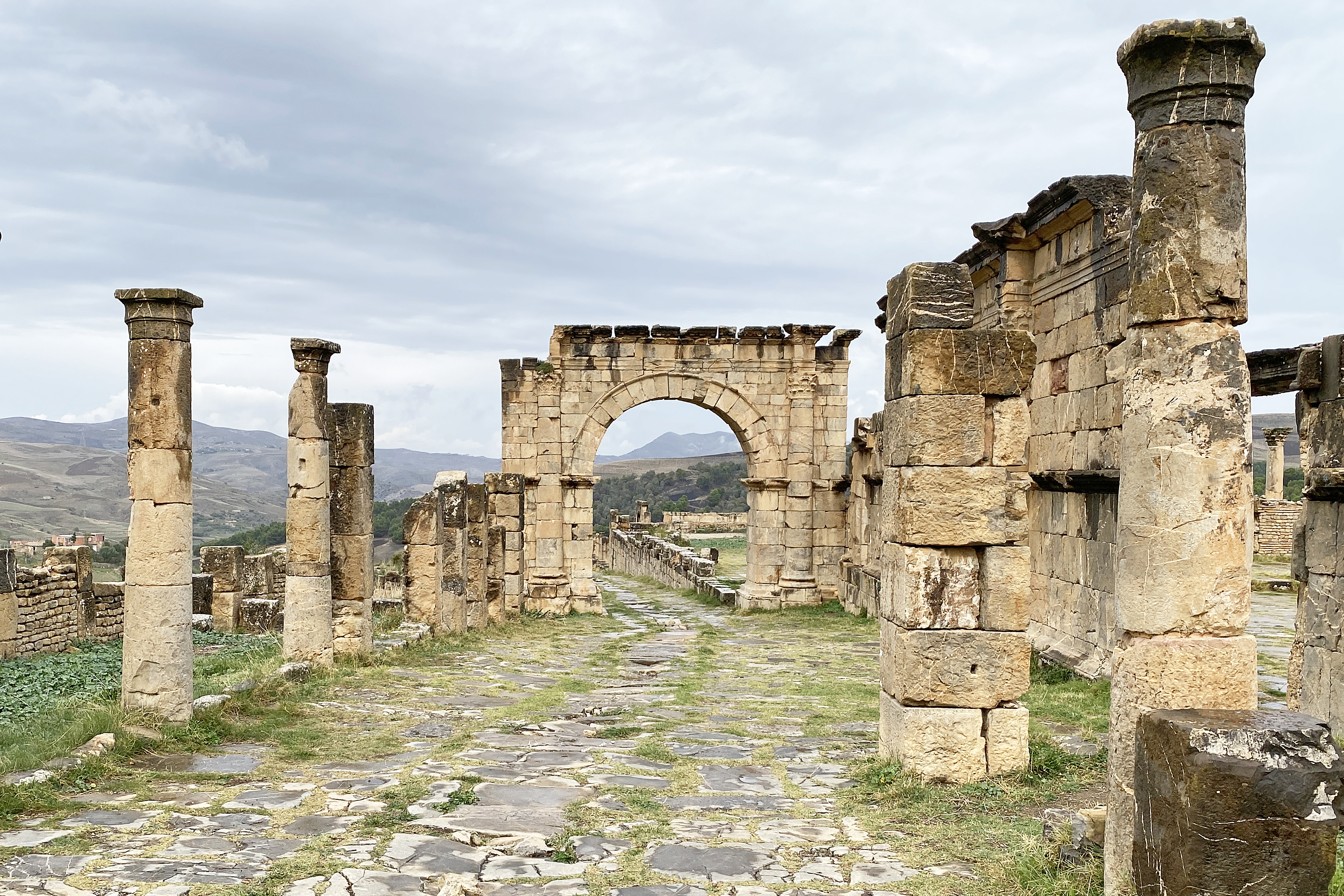
Cardo Maximus

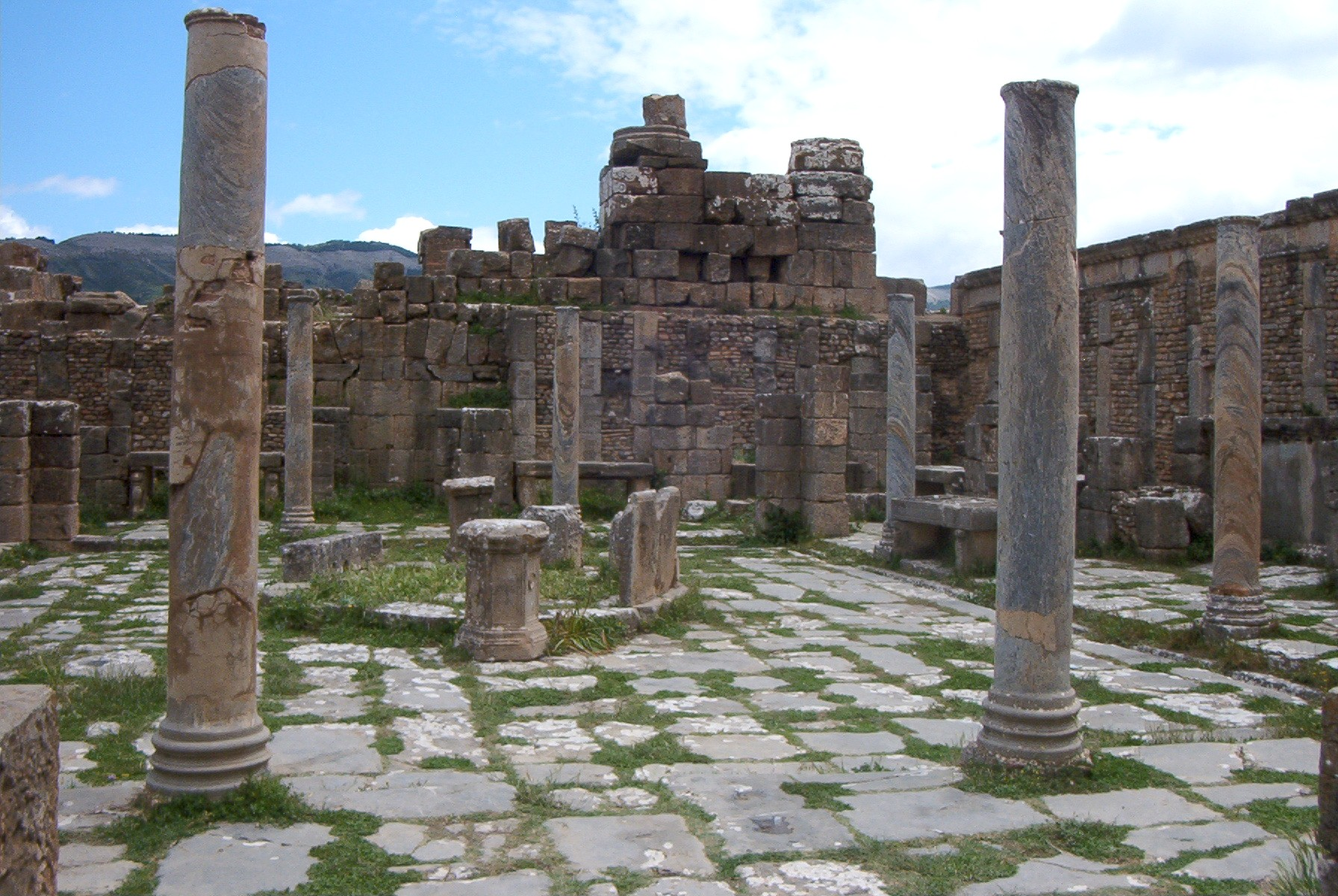
The Macellum

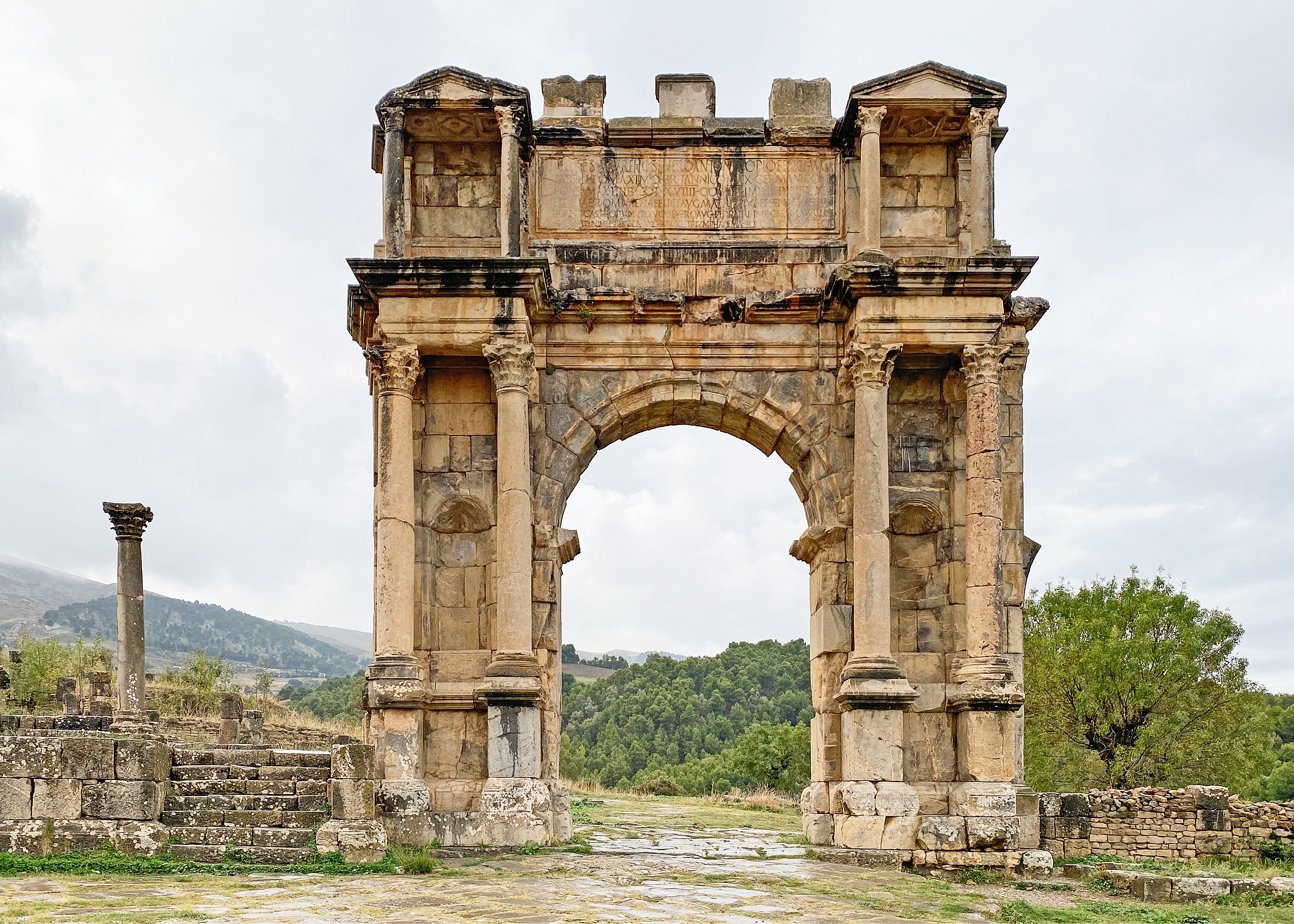
The Arch of Caracalla

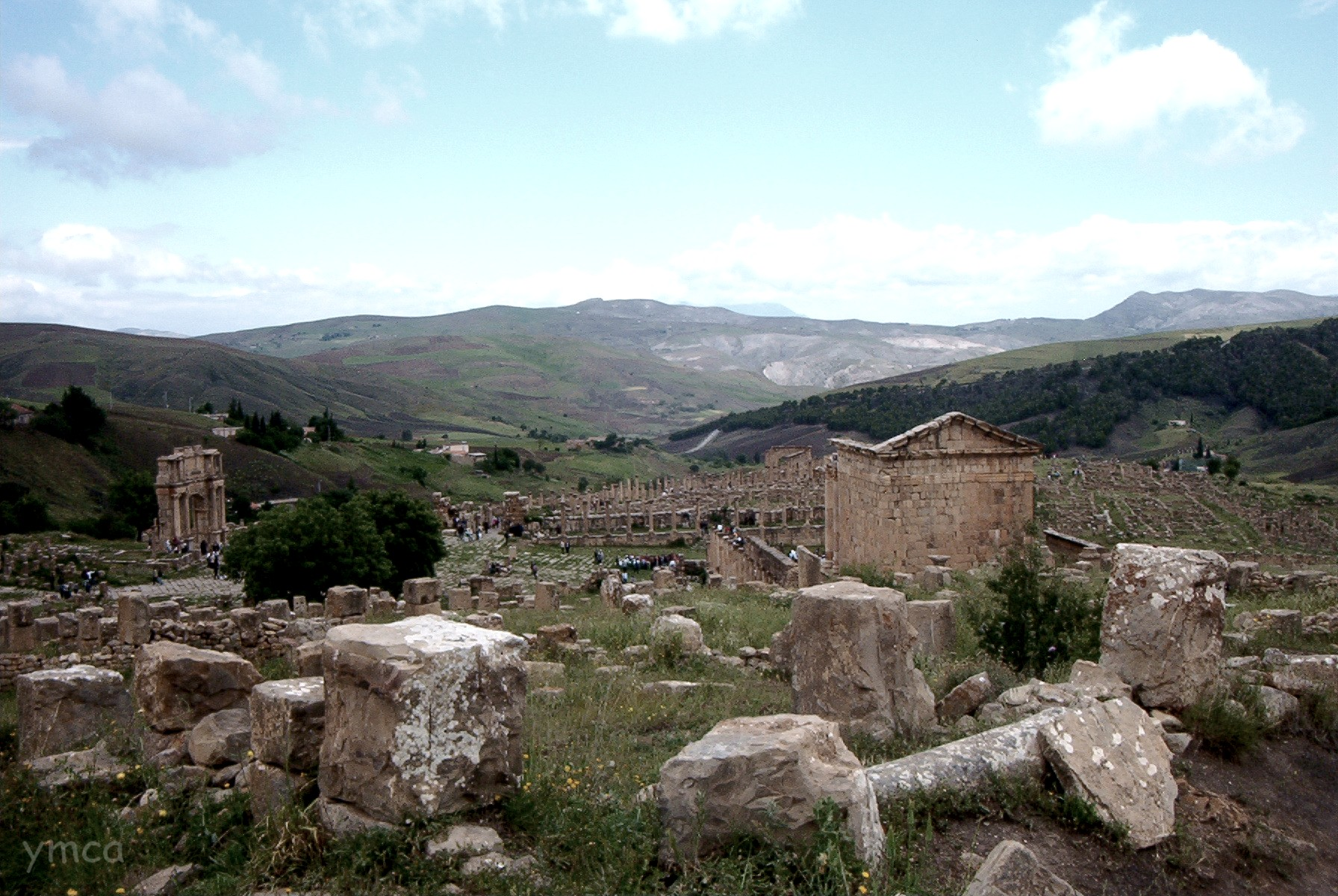
Forum laid out by Septimius Severus

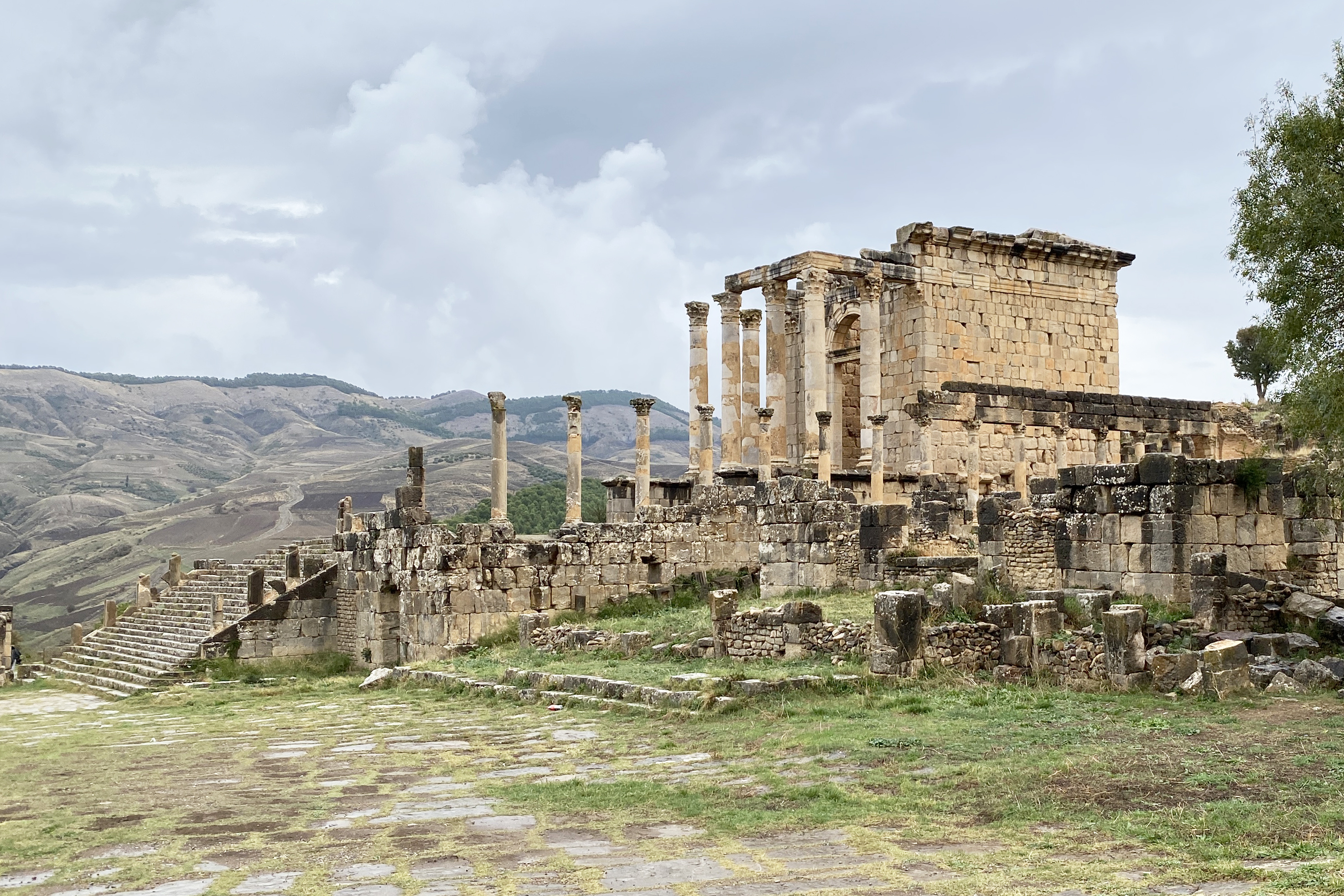
Temple of Gens Septimia

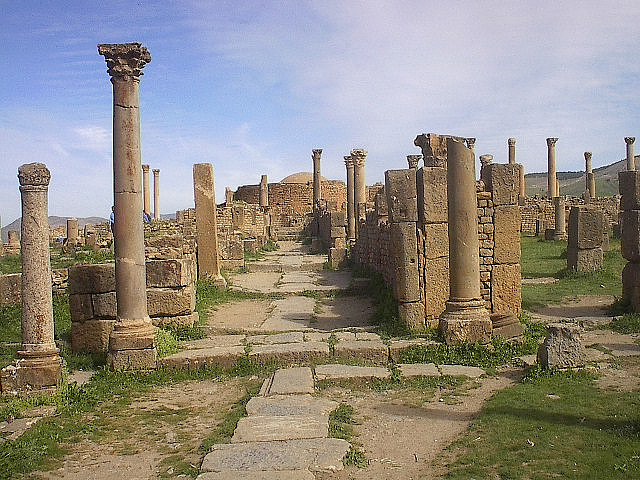
Christian quarter

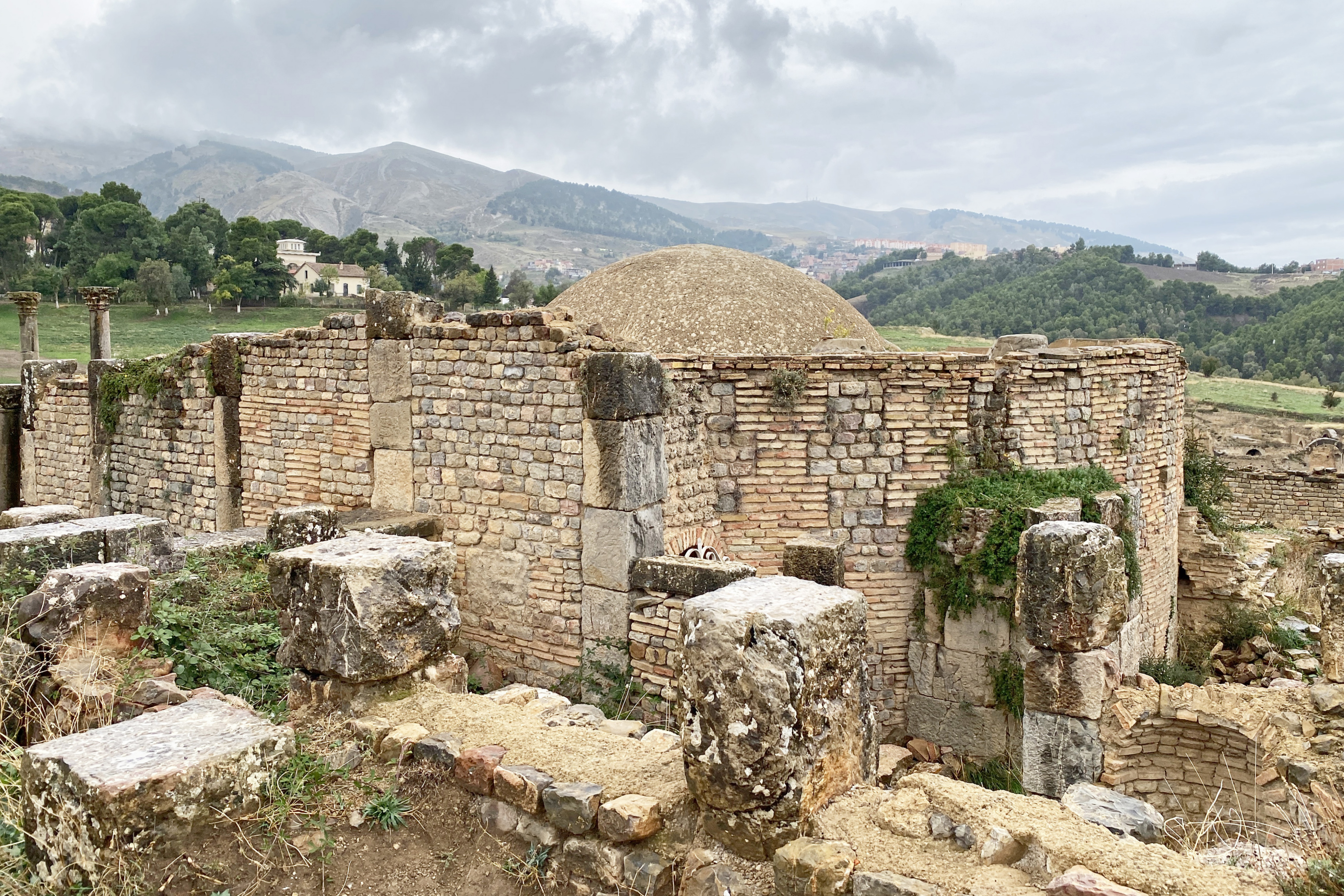
Christian baptismal area

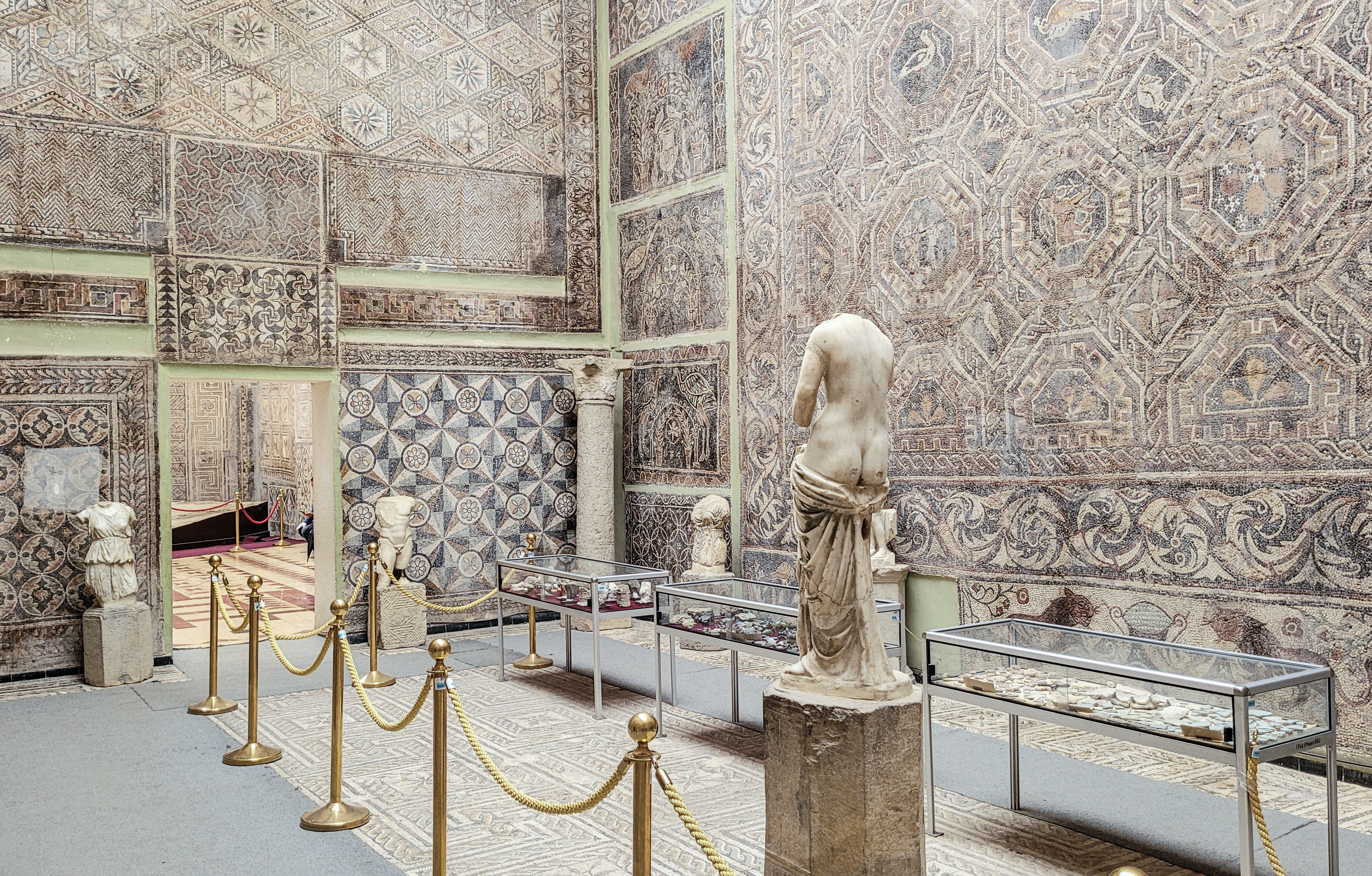
Museum

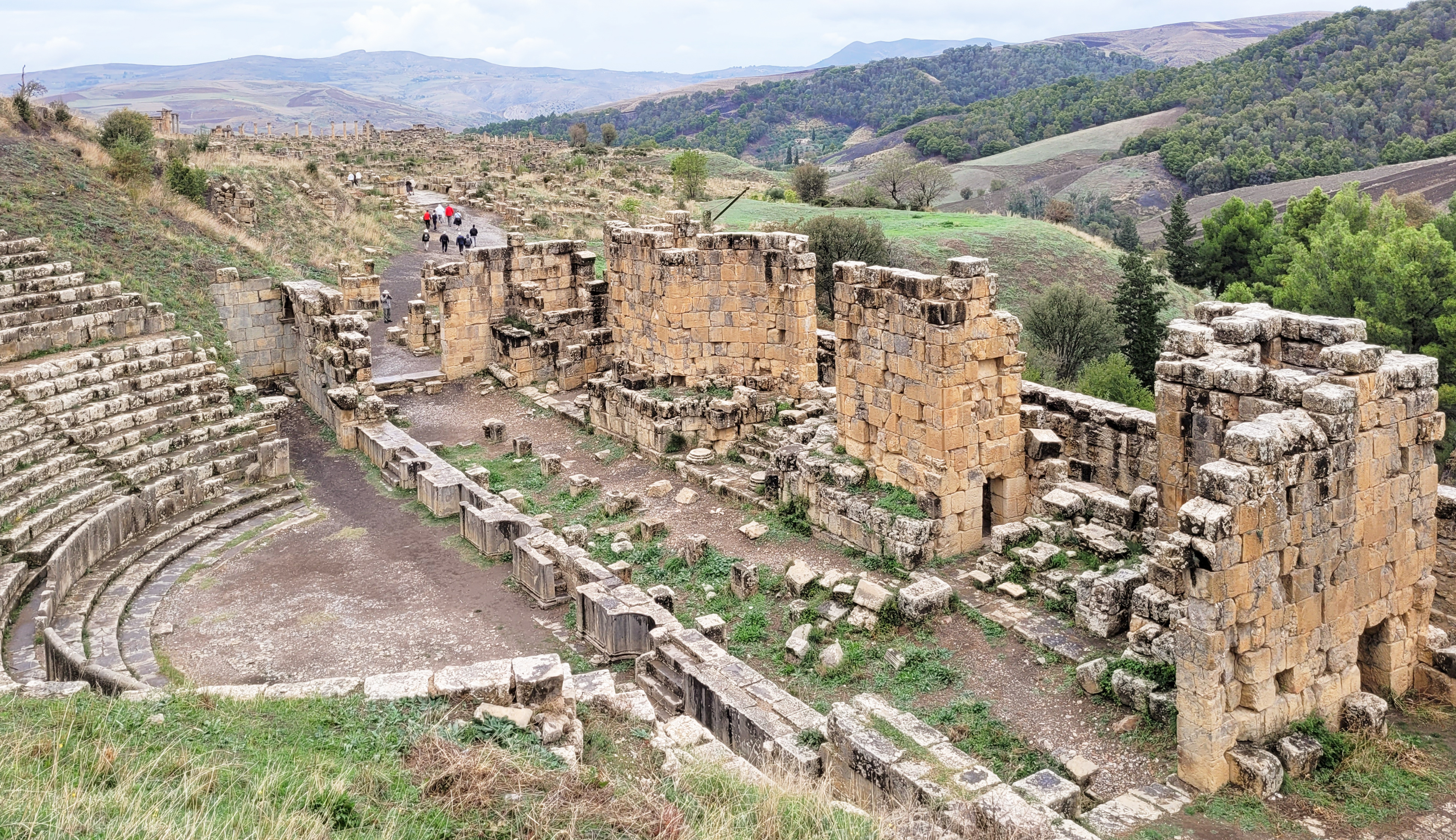
Roman theater

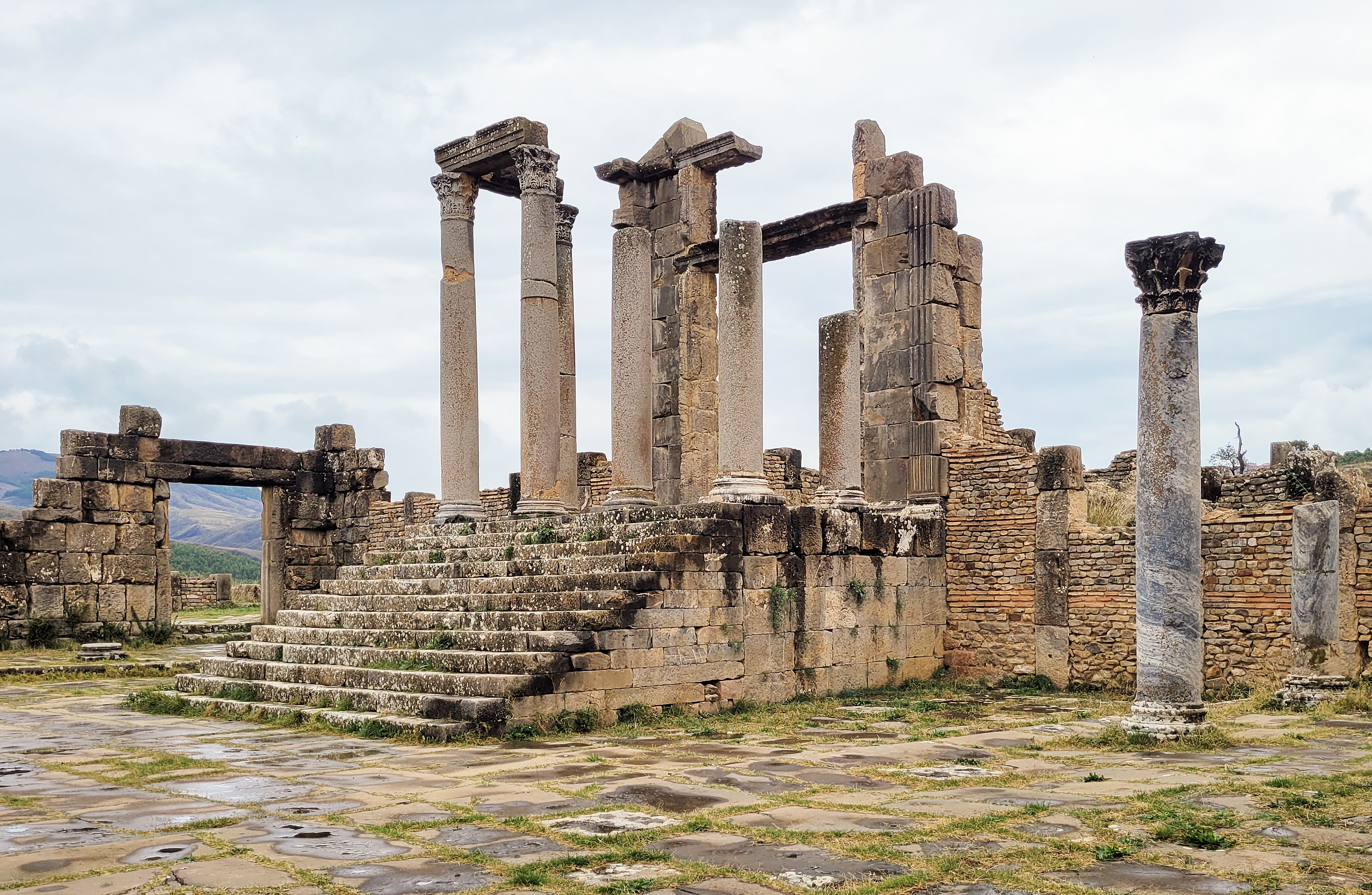
Temple of Venus Genetrix

== See also ==
- Mauretania Caesariensis
- Volubilis
- List of cultural assets of Algeria
