= Titus Caesernius Quinctianus =

Titus Caesernius Quinctianus was a Roman senator who held a number of appointments in the Imperial service during the reigns of Hadrian and Antoninus Pius. He was suffect consul in an undetermined nundinium around the year 138. His full name was Titus Caesernius Statius Quinctius Macedo Quinctianus.

Quinctianus was the older son of the procurator Titus Caesernius Statius Quinctius Macedo; the name of his younger brother is Titus Caesernius Statianus, suffect consul in 141. The Caesernii were a leading family of Aquileia.

== Life ==
His cursus honorum up to his consulate is known from the dedication to a statue set up at Aquileia. His career began in his teens as one of the tresviri monetalis, the most prestigious of the four boards that comprise the vigintiviri; assignment to this board was usually allocated to patricians or favored individuals. This was followed by a commission as military tribune in Legio XXX Ulpia Victrix, which was stationed at Colonia Ulpia Traiana, the future Xanten. Upon returning to Rome, Quinctianus quaestor as a candidate of the emperor, as his brother would be some years later. This was a prestigious achievement, and upon completion of this traditional Republican magistracy he was enrolled in the Senate. At the completion of his term, he became a comes Augusti per Siciliam Africam et Mauretaniam, or a companion of the emperor Hadrian during his tour of Sicily, Africa and Mauretania around the year 128. According to Anthony Birley, this inscription is our sole piece of evidence that Hadrian visited Sicily a second time, having first visited the island three years before. Quinctianus returned once again to Rome, where two more of the traditional Republican magistracies followed: plebeian tribune then praetor peregrini. Géza Alföldy dates his praetorship to approximately 131.

After he stepped down as praetor, Quinctianus held four appointments from the Emperor. The first was again as comes Augusti, only this time he accompanied the emperor Hadrian on his tour of Illyricum and the eastern provinces; Alföldy dates this to approximately 131 and 132. He was then commissioned legatus legionis or commander of Legio X Gemina then stationed in Judea; Alföldy dates his command of the legion from approximately 133 to 136. The last two offices he was appointed to before his consulate was curator of the Via Appia and prefect of the alimentus, which he likely held from the year 136 to 138. Between his praetorship and consulate, Quinctianus also was admitted to the Roman priesthood of the sodales Augustales.

Quinctianus' life following his consulate is a blank.
