= Ulpius Marcellus =

Late 2nd century Roman governor of Britannia

Ulpius Marcellus was a Roman consular governor of Britannia who returned there as general of the later 2nd century.

Ulpius Marcellus is recorded as governor of Roman Britain in an inscription of 176–80, and apparently returned to Rome after a tenure without serious incident. He was sent out again by the Emperor Commodus to suppress a serious revolt in 180, which earned him the reputation of a disciplinarian. Dio Cassius records that tribes from the north breached Hadrian's Wall which separated them from the empire and killed a general (possibly Marcellus' predecessor, Caerellius Priscus) with all his guards, presumably during an inspection of Hadrian's Wall. Little else is known of the revolt except that Dio called it the most serious war of Commodus' reign and reported that it was not quelled until about 184, when commemorative coins were issued and Commodus assumed the title of Britannicus. Further coins were issued in 185 however, and a hoard of silver coins with final issues from 186/7 suggest that unrest and fighting continued into later years.

Marcellus undertook punitive raids north of the border and may have attempted to reoccupy the Antonine Wall. However, he ultimately withdrew to Hadrian's Wall and probably concluded treaties with the relevant tribes. The forts north of the wall such as Newstead were abandoned. Two inscriptions at the fort at Cilurnum mention him in connection with the Ala II Asturum.

He was hampered by a lack of control over his troops. Marcellus was a martinet and the troops in Britain under Commodus were highly mutinous, going so far as to later put forward a pretender to the imperial throne. He was thought to have had a son, also called Ulpius Marcellus, serving as governor around thirty years later, although this is based on a misdated inscription and the existence of a second Marcellus is now discounted.

== See also ==
- Ulpia gens

== Notes ==
| Preceded by Caerellius Priscus | Roman governors of Britain | Succeeded by Publius Helvius Pertinax |
