= Octavius Sabinus =

Roman Governor of Britannia Inferior (262-266 AD)

Octavius Sabinus was a Gallo-Roman governor of Britannia Inferior c. AD 262 and 266. Little is known of this individual: An inscription at Lancaster mentions that he was of the senatorial rank who served under Emperor Postumus during the Gallic consulship of Censor and Lepidus. The same monument also notes that Octavius Sabinus refurbished a local bath-house and a basilica.
