= Calvisius Rufus =

3rd century Roman governor of Britannia Inferior

Calvisius Rufus was a governor of Britannia Inferior, a province of Roman Britain during the reign of Severus Alexander (AD 222 and 235). It is unclear whether his governorship precedes or succeeds those of Claudius Apellinus and Valerius Crescens Fulvianus. Little else is known of him, although an inscription records his remodeling of a building at Old Penrith.
