= Aurelius Arpagius =

Aurelius Arpagius was a governor of one of the provinces of Roman Britain, probably Britannia Secunda. He is known from a single building inscription from a Roman fort at Birdoswald (RIB 1912), which describes the rebuilding of several buildings at the fort under the Tetrarchy. The inscription dates to the period AD 296–305, just after Rome had retaken Britain from Allectus.
