= Valerius Crescens Fulvianus =

Valerius Crescens Fulvianus was a governor of Britannia Inferior, a province of Roman Britain, during the reign of Severus Alexander (AD 222 and 235). It is unclear whether his governorship precedes or succeeds those of Calvisius Rufus and Claudius Apellinus. Little else is known of him although an inscription does record him restoring a temple at Bremetennacum (Ribchester).
