= Caerellia =

Ancient Roman woman and friend of Cicero

Caerellia (c. 116 BCE - c. 36 BCE) was a wealthy Roman matron distinguished for her philosophical pursuits. She was a friend of Cicero who shared his interest in philosophy, and attempted to mend his relationship with his second wife whom he had divorced.

She was accused by Quintus Fufius Calenus of having an affair with Cicero, the truthfulness of which is unknown. She was quite wealthy and had large possessions in Asia.
