= Virius Lupus (consul 278) =

3rd century Roman senator, governor and consul

Virius Lupus was a consul of the Roman Empire in 278.

== Career ==
Possibly the son of Lucius Virius Lupus Iulianus, consul in 232, Lupus had a sufficiently distinguished career for him to be consul suffectus sometime before 275. After this, he was appointed Consularis of Caelimontium, one of the 14 regions of ancient Rome. He was also appointed curator of Laurentum.

During the reign of the emperor Gallienus, Lupus was appointed the senatorial Praeses (governor) of Arabia Petraea (a position he held before 259). During his term the rhetorician Callinicus of Petra dedicated a work to Lupus, titled On Rhetorical Mannerism.

Following this, during the 260s, Lupus was appointed to the governorship of Syria Coele, which, although nominally subject to Gallienus, placed him under the authority of Odaenathus. During 271–272, he was serving as governor of Asia, this time his allegiance shifted from Zenobia to the emperor Aurelian. He was heavily involved in Aurelian's restructure of Zenobian Syria following the emperor's subjugation of the east. During this time, he was also iudex sacrarum cognition of Egypt and the east. This was followed by his appointment as pontifex dei solis, one of the earliest appointments made by Aurelian to his new college of priests serving Sol Invictus.

While in the east, he sided with Probus after Probus was proclaimed emperor in 276. As a reward, Lupus was then made consul for the second time in 278 alongside Probus. After his term in office, the emperor appointed him Urban prefect of Rome, a position he held from 278 to 280.

== Sources ==
- Martindale, John R.; Jones, A. H. M.; Morris, John, eds. (1971). The Prosopography of the Later Roman Empire: Volume I, AD 260–395. Cambridge: Cambridge University Press. ISBN 0-521-07233-6.
- Potter, David Stone, The Roman Empire at Bay, AD 180-395 (2004).
- Watson, Alaric, Aurelian and the Third Century (1999).

Political offices
Preceded by Marcus Aurelius Probus, and Paulinus	Consul of the Roman Empire; 278 with Marcus Aurelius Probus II	Succeeded by Marcus Aurelius Probus III, and Nonius Paternus II
