= Gaius Junius Faustinus Postumianus =

Roman senator governor (fl. 3rd century)

Gaius Junius Faustinus Postumianus was a Roman senator who flourished in the third century. He is known from an inscription found near Thugga erected by his son Placidus and daughter Paulina. He held a number of appointments, most importantly as praeses (governor) in Hispania Tarraconensis and Britain. The date of his appointment is unclear, so the province may have been either Britannia Superior or the undivided province of Roman Britain.

== A second inscription ==
A second inscription recounting a cursus honorum of a man with an identical name, is thought by many scholars to also apply to this Postumianus. However, Anthony Birley notes, "the only discepant item" is that his name "seems to match the cognomen of our governor's son": [C. J]unius Faustinus [Pl]a[ci]dus Postumian[us].

This inscription mentions that he was promoted to comes of two Emperors, which implies this happened either in the co-reign of Septimius Severus and his son Caracalla, or perhaps as late as the co-reign of Valerian and Gallienus. If it was during the reign of the first pair, Birley reconstructs his biography as follows. Postumianus was born in the 160s and entered the Senate during the reign of Commodus. Both as plebeian tribune and praetor he was the candidate of the emperor, between which he was selected to serve a year as legatus to the proconsul of Asia. Postumius followed this with a term as juridicus of Aemilia, Etruria and Tuscany, then a commission as legatus legionis of Legio I Adiutrix. He was appointed to a series imperial provinces, first Lusitania, then during the reign of the two Emperors Gallia Belgica followed by Moesia Inferior; Birley dates Postumianus' suffect consulate to c. 204, between the last two provinces, and the governorship of Moesia Inferior between 205 and 208. Then, as comes, he participated in the British campaign of 208–211; this inscription was then erected "not later than 209, since otherwise Auggg. would have been required" -- that was the year Severus made his younger son Geta co-emperor.

Birley admits that if Postumianus' career properly belongs to the later reigns of Valerian and Gallienus, "the various posts ... could have been held under those two emperors and their predecessors in the 240s and 250s."

== Date of his governorship ==
The title praeses suggests the third century, when it came into common usage. Beyond that, little can be said for certain. If we assume both inscriptions refer to the same man, that the first inscription provides the proper order he held those two provinces, and that he was governor in Britain before it was divided into two provinces (which happened by 217), he must have been governor of Britain during the sole reign of Caracalla. But if the order of the two provinces are reversed -- he was governor of Britain then Hispania Tarraconensis -- as Géza Alföldy argues, he was governor of Britain between 207 and 211, then governor in Spain c. 211–214. Or, if he was governor after Britain was divided into two provinces, he might have been the first consular governor of Britannia Superior. Lastly, if his career properly belongs to the later reigns of Valerian and Gallienus, then he could have been governor of either British province in the mid- to late 250s.

== See also ==
- Junia (gens)
