= Victorinus (Roman governor) =

Victorinus is the recorded name of a vicarius of Roman Britain probably serving between 395 and 406. He is mentioned by the Gaul Rutilius Claudius Namatianus in his De reditu i, 493-510 who had met him later in Gaul around 417.

Victorinus had probably ruled prior to the usurpation of Marcus in 406. After serving in Britain and Italy, he had retired to Aquitania, leaving in 409 or 414 due to barbarian raids and settling in Rome.
