= Claudius Xenophon =

3rd century Roman Governor of Britannica Inferior

Claudius Xenophon (or Xenephon) was a governor of Britannia Inferior, a province of Roman Britain around AD 223. He is named on two milestones with nearly identical texts, which can be dated to that year. He succeeded Marius Valerianus, whose rule is attested in AD 222; and Xenophon's governorship must have ended by AD 225, when another governor is mentioned in a fragmentary inscription, which only provides part of the name (Maximus). He is also mentioned in inscriptions in Vindolanda and perhaps at Chesters. His father is thought to be a T. Cl(audius) T. f(ilius) Papiria Xenophon, who is mentioned in inscriptions and papyri in various procuratorships in Egypt and Dacia under Commodus.
