= Lucius Alfenus Senecio =

Lucius Alfenus Senecio was a Roman figure of the late 2nd and early 3rd centuries.

== Career ==
Born in Curculum, Africa (Roman province) (Djemila, Algeria), Lucius Alfenus Senecio was a Numidian (Romanised Berber). He served as procurator Augusti in Gallia Belgica, then in Mauretania Caesariensis (196-197?). After consulship, served as governor of Syria between 200 and 205. Between c. 205 and 207, he was the last governor of all Roman Britain prior to its division into multiple provinces.

He restored many of the installations at Hadrian's Wall following the uprisings of earlier years and a Victory dedication mentions his name. Dio Cassius also writes of victories in Britain in 206 and it is therefore likely that he finished the re-occupation of the province and its frontiers. Troubles from the tribes immediately north of the wall however, trouble from the Maeatae and the Caledonian Confederacy appear to have required expeditions north of the wall. Senecio seems to have been initially successful; he erected a victory monument at Benwell.

Herodian records that he requested re-enforcements from emperor Septimius Severus, perhaps to undertake punishment raids in Scotland or for a military expedition led by the emperor himself. His report back to Rome described barbarians rebelling, "overrunning the land, taking booty and causing destruction". Despite being 62 years old, Septimius Severus chose to intervene personally, arriving in 208 to lead new campaigns.

When Severus arrived in Britain he charged his youngest son, Publius Septimius Geta with the task of administering some aspects of Roman Britain although as viceroy rather than as a formal governor.

When Severus died at York in 211, his eldest son, Caracalla tried to claim the throne. As part of his efforts to settle matters in Britain before leaving to press his claim, he may have divided the province into Britannia Inferior in the north and Britannia Superior in the south, each with its own governor. Alternatively, the division may have been decreed by Severus sometime previously.

== Notes ==
Preceded by Gaius Valerius Pudens	Roman governors of Britain	Succeeded by Division of Britain
