= Nonius Philippus =

Roman governor

Nonius Philippus was a governor of Britannia Inferior, a province of Roman Britain by AD 242. Little else is known of him as he is mentioned only on a dedication at Old Carlisle.
