= Viria Acte =

Viria Acte (fl. AD 90) was an entrepreneur and one of the few women known from Hispania. She was probably born in Horta of Valencia and of freed slave origin, based on her last name Acte, and married to her husband Crescens.

She is known from three inscriptions found in today Valencia, dated to the Flavian or Nerva–Antonine dynasties. She was described as a wealthy owner of a sculpture workshop with a high social reputation, as evident by statue of herself erected in the city forum. Her profession is fairly uncommon, as during this time women's properties usually came from dowries and inheritance. In one of the inscriptions it is stated that carried out a monumental work in Valentia, which may have been the restoration of the temple of Mars.
