= Claudius Apellinus =

Roman governor (bef. 222 - uncertain 235)

Claudius Apellinus was a governor of Britannia Inferior, a province of Roman Britain during the reign of Severus Alexander (AD 222 and 235). It is unclear whether his governorship precedes or succeeds those of Calvisius Rufus and Valerius Crescens Fulvianus. Apellinus is known through an inscription marking the repair of a ballistarium at Bremenium, today High Rochester, Northumberland.

Edmund Groag first suggested that this official was related to the Claudii Apellini of Perge in Pamphylia. Anthony Birley notes that it is curious that Apellinus is known as leg. Augg. pr. pr., and speculates whether Aug. was amended to Augg. (the plural form) to indicate that Apellinus had become the legate of Maximinus and his son Maximus.
