= Lucius Virius Lupus Iulianus =

Lucius Virius Lupus Iulianus (fl. 3rd century AD) was a Roman military officer and senator who served as consul ordinarius in 232 alongside Lucius Marius Maximus.

== Biography ==
Probably the son of Virius Lupus, suffect consul before AD 196, and a member of the third century gens Virii, Iulianus had a long career serving in the Roman Empire. His earliest known appointment was as one of the sevir equitum Romanorum of the annual review of the equites at Rome; this was followed by his appointment as the triumvir capitales, or overseer of prisons and executions, which was one of the four magistracies that comprised the vigintiviri. This was the least desirable of the four, for men who held that office rarely had a successful career: Anthony Birley could find only five tresviri capitales who went on to be governors of consular imperial provinces.

His next posting was as legatus proconsulis in the province of Lycia et Pamphylia. Iulianus was then admitted directly to the senate with quaestorian rank (Allectus inter quaestorios), and this was followed by an appointment as Praetor.

In 232, Iulianus was granted an ordinary consulship, with Lucius Marius Maximus as his colleague. His last known posting was as Legatus Augusti pro praetore (or imperial governor) of the province of Syria Coele, sometime during the reign of Gordian III (238—244).

Iulianus' brother, Lucius Virius Agricola, served as consul ordinarius in 230. He was probably the father of Virius Lupus, who was consul in 278.

== Sources ==
- Mennen, Inge, Power and Status in the Roman Empire, AD 193-284 (2011)

Political offices
| Preceded by L. Ti. Claudius Pompeianus; T. Flavius Sallustius Paelignianus | Roman consul 232; With: Lucius Marius Maximus | Succeeded by Lucius Valerius Maximus; Gnaeus Cornelius Paternus |
