= Marius Valerianus =

Marius Valerianus was a governor of Britannia Inferior, a province of Roman Britain between 221 and 223. He is known through three inscriptions he left at Chesters, Netherby and South Shields. Anthony Birley notes that these inscriptions are useful because "they illustrate the fact that the praetorian governor of the Lower province was responsible for the whole of the northern frontier of Roman Britain, from the North Sea to the western outpost north of Carlisle."

Although admitting that nothing more is known of his career, Birley notes E. Ritterling's suggestion that he may be the same man attested as a centurion in the Praetorian Guard, at some point not earlier than the reign of Septimius Severus. "The rise of such a man to senatorial rank, 'von der Pike', would not be a surprise during the reign of Elagabalus."
