= Carausius II =

Possible Roman usurper in Roman Britain between the years 354 and 358

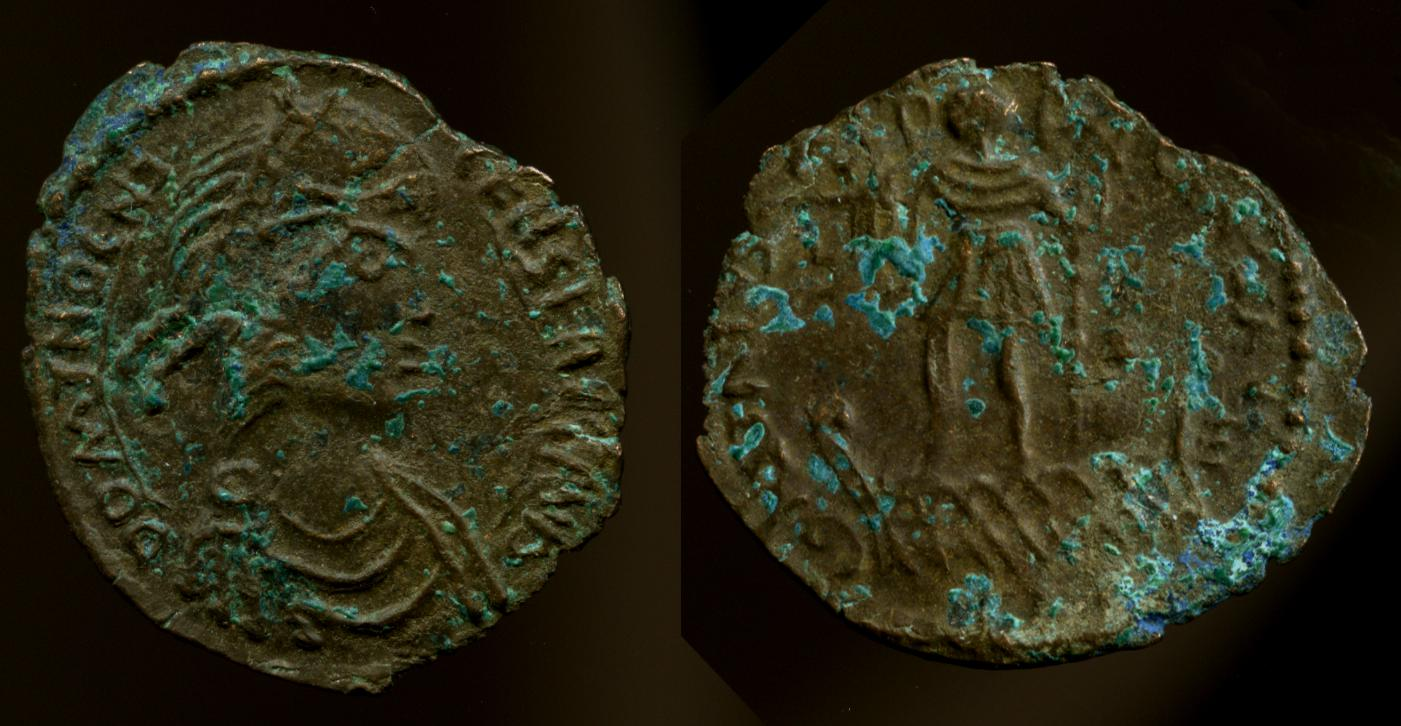
Coin attributed to Carausius II / Censeris, with mostly clear obverse legend: DOMINO CNS CENSER[...]

Carausius II (or Censeris, or Genseris, or Censorius) may have been one or several usurper(s) in Roman Britain during the mid-fourth century AD. The suggestion of Carausius' existence relies entirely on the study of approximately twenty coins. No corroborating inscriptions, documents, or other contemporary historical accounts are currently known to exist.

The British Museum, citing the 1994 work by P. J. Casey, considers the coins in its collection (including at least one of the well-studied pieces) to be contemporary forgeries not representative of any legitimate historical figure.

== Initial proposal ==
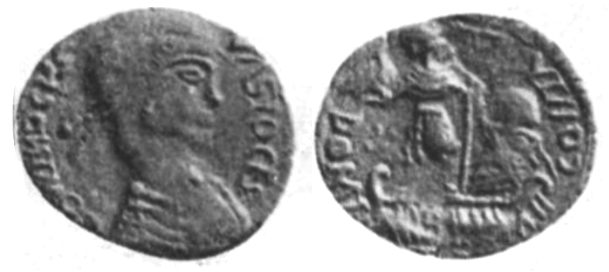
Plate image of the Evans coin, which is now held in the Ashmolean Museum.

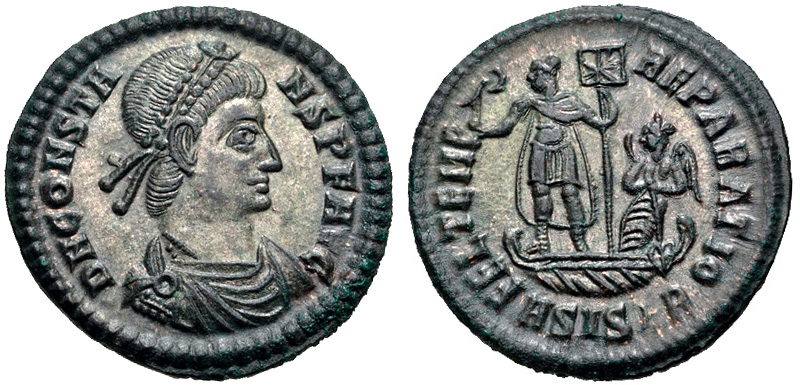
Coin of Constans, showing the prototype design to the Evans coin.

The modern history of Carausius II began with a paper published by Arthur J. Evans in 1887. He wrote of a coin discovered in Richborough, the obverse of which he interpreted as "DOMINO CARAVƧIO CEƧ", (the AR, VƧI, and EƧ in ligature). He interpreted partial reverse legend as reading "DOMIN... CONXTA... NO," a fragmentary and abbreviated version of DOMINO CONSTANTINO.

Evans took special interest in the latter portion of the obverse legend, CEƧ, believing it to indicate that this coin depicted a previously unrecorded junior emperor. He noted that the coin's design was a reproduction of a Constantinian reverse type, originally minted from c. 348 to 355 AD. Unlike earlier barbarous imitations, however, which are typically dated contemporaneously to (or slightly later than) their official prototypes, Evans stated that "there can ... be little doubt that the coin with which we are at present concerned belongs to a considerably later date than its prototype."

Evans approached the dating of this new coin by comparing it to other non-numismatic inscriptions, both subjectively in style of letters and ligatures, and objectively in abbreviations / substitutions used (i.e., the use of X instead of S, as seen in the reverse legend, is well attested in other romano-british inscriptions). He cited several stone inscriptions found throughout England and Wales, including the undated "Carausius Stone" found in Penmachno, though he explicitly stated it was unlikely that the two to refer to the same Carausius. He also found ligature similarities in a stone from Ravenscar, which is popularly (though disputedly) dated to circa 407 AD.

Evans would conclude that the coin could be dated to approximately the same time period as the Ravenscar stone. He hypothesized that this Carausius may have been caesar under Constantine III (whose name, he claims, is referred to on the reverse as DOMIN[O] CONXTA[NTI]NO), and may have struck coins in Britain while Constantine was suppressing the revolt of Gerontius in Hispania in 409 AD.

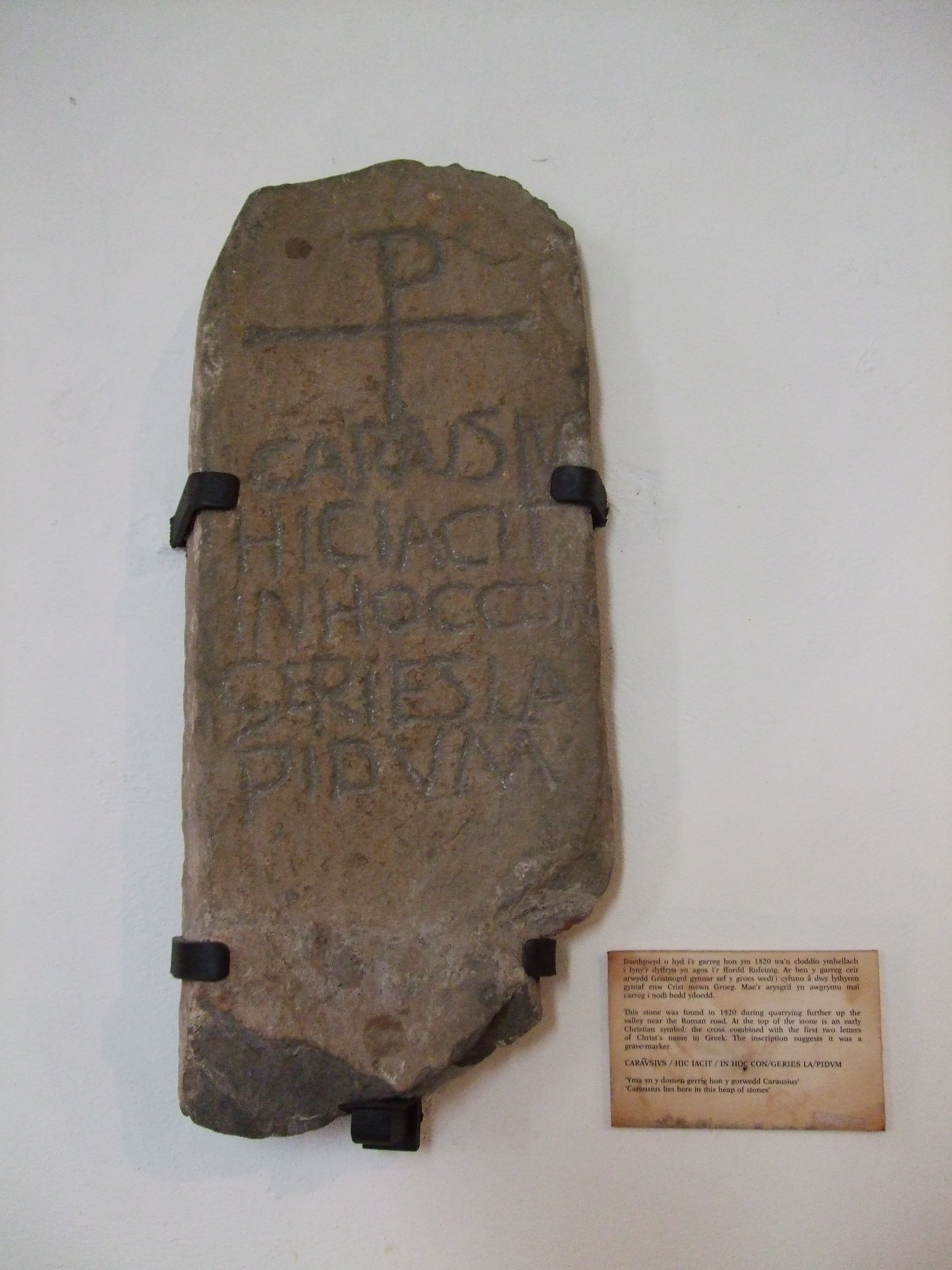
The Carausius Stone at St Tudclud's Church in Penmachno

Evans did note that are no mentions of this Carausius Caesar's rank, let alone his name, in any known contemporary source. Although there is at least one accepted usurper attested exclusively through numismatic evidence (Silbannacus), Evans noted it is unlikely such a high-ranking figure would go completely unrecorded.

== Subsequent works ==
=== Anscombe (1927) ===
In the 1927 issue of the British Numismatic Journal, Alfred Anscombe published some of the first criticisms to the original theories proposed in Evans' publication. In this, he both critiques Evans' interpretation of the original coin, and also introduces two additional, similar coins: one a recent (1924) discovery by F. S. Salisbury at Richborough, and the second an unpublished piece in the British Museum collection.

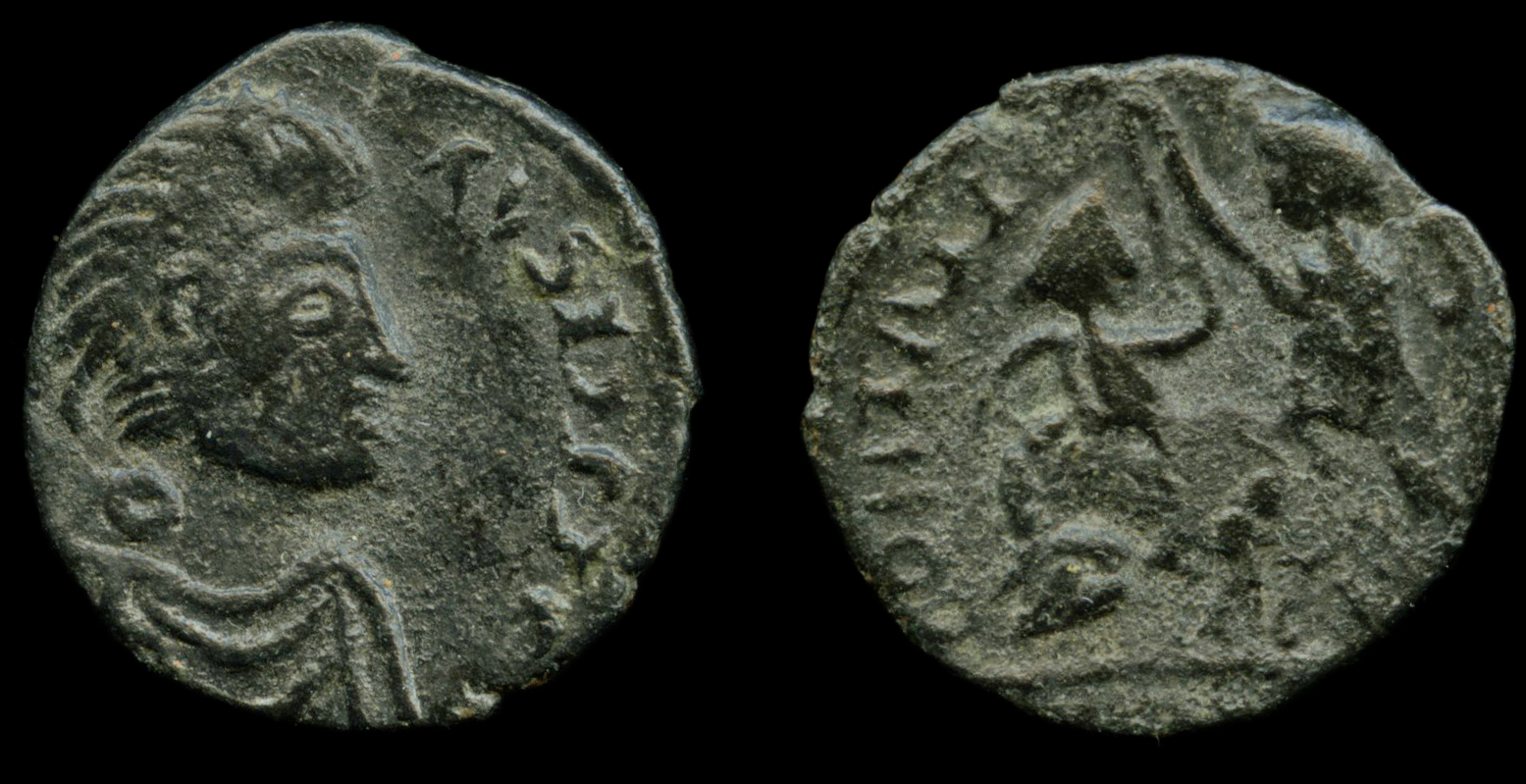
The second coin, found in Richborough, 1924.

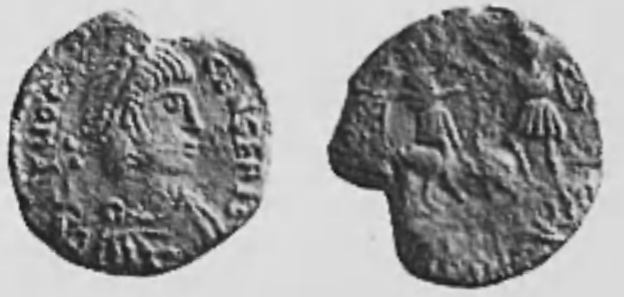
The "Unpublished British Museum coin", first published by Anscombe in 1927 but described in more detail by J. W. E. Pearce in 1928

Anscombe had several issues with Evans' interpretation of the first coin, foremost being his proposed chronology. Anscombe wrote that the years 407-411 AD are "...comparatively well illuminated historically, and the story of the Western Constantine the Third is quite precise ... in the history of Roman Britain in the fourth and fifth centuries." That is, despite being rife with short-term emperors, usurpers, generals, and caesars (such as Marcus, Gratian, Constantine III, Constans II, Gerontius, Maximus, and Constantius III), the first decade of the 5th century Empire is fairly well-attested by contemporary authors. Nowhere, in any contemporary account, is there mention of a Carausius Caesar.

Anscombe also discusses this Carausius' supposed rank of Caesar: a rank which, though still in occasional use as late as 467 AD (by Anthemius), had become rather rare. Any person declared Caesar during this era was sure to be a prominent political figure, and was almost always closely associated with the emperor. In this regard, he would agree with Evans' point about the improbability of such a figure going completely unrecorded. He, however, did not provide an alternative dating to Evans'.

The primary argument investigated in his paper is that Evans misinterpreted the name written on the first coin. Anscombe would suggest its obverse legend read DOMINO CENSAVRIO CES, implying the usurper's name was Censorius rather than Carausius.

The 1924 coin, which Salisbury had initially read clockwise as [DOMINO CAR]ΛVSIO CES, was reinterpreted by Anscombe in light of his assessment of the Evans coin. He instead opted to read the legend counterclockwise, coming up with CES CESΛV, which he expanded to read [DOMINO] C[A]ES CE[N]SAV[RIO]. This interpretation is somewhat bizarre, as a counterclockwise, outward-facing legend is completely unattested for any officially-struck late roman coin, usurper or otherwise.

The thitherto unpublished British Museum coin provides the most convincing evidence for the reinterpretation of Carausius as Censorius. It is in similar style and size to the Salisbury coin, but has a much better strike and is considerably less worn. Anscombe, presumably working from the same poor-quality plate seen above, could only definitively make out [...]CENSER[...] in the obverse legend. He hypothesized the full legend may contain [...]CENSERIO[...], which would be an especially rare phoenetic variation of the name Censorius.

A short paper published by J. W. E. Pearce would elucidate that this coin's full legend actually read "DOMINO CA CENSERIS", which lends, in part, to the third colloquial name for this hypothetical usurper. It, too, was found in Richborough, but this fact was not widely known until after Salisbury and Anscombe had published their respective works.

=== Mattingly (1933 and 1939) ===
In two other works, neither of which were directly related to the issue of Carausius/Censeris, Harold Mattingly would document two of the claimed usurper's coins as "Imitations of Constantius II or Constans, but overstruck on earlier types" and "Barbarous 4th century overstrikes," respectively. He did not comment specifically on either coin, but Sutherland would later regard these as tacit challenges to opinions considering Carausius/Censeris as a real historical figure.

=== Sutherland (1945) ===
C. H. V. Sutherland published the next major paper, also challenging Evans' original work, in 1945. In the two decades since Anscombe's paper, an additional three coins had come to light, one being the Pierce coin published the year after Anscombe's work. The other two were both of unverifiable origin, although one, shown to Sutherland by Sir Charles Oman, was supposedly found somewhere in Oxfordshire.

In his paper, Sutherland largely disregards Anscombe's prior reinterpretation, reverting instead to criticizing Evans' work directly. He discusses four main issues with his interpretation: the coins' modules (size), evidence of overstriking, the titulature, and the designs.

All of the coins known to Sutherland, apart from one, were 18-20mm in size. He argued that this size was anachronistic to the Theodosian standard that would have been used in the early 5th century, whose small bronze coins were typically only 12-16mm in diameter. If a usurper or local leader were to arise and start striking coinage, it would be unlikely for them to arbitrarily abandon the standard already in use. Similarly, where two of the known coins showed clear signs of overstriking, he argued it would be unusual for a mint to do so atop "coins of obsolete size."

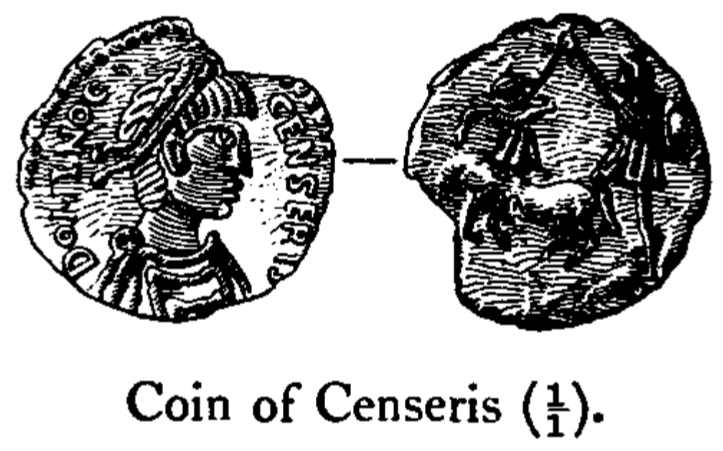
Line Drawing of the Pearce coin (1928)

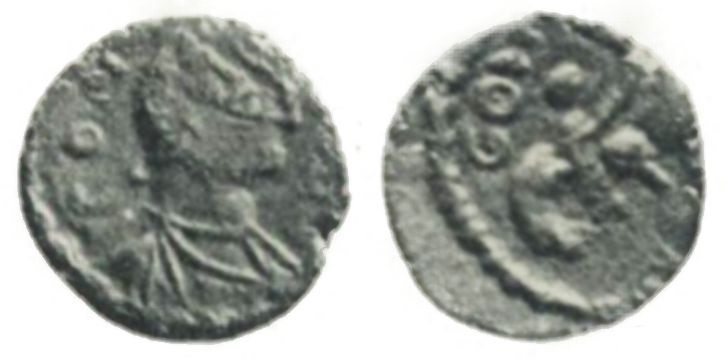
The 6th coin published by Sutherland, mistakenly catalogued as being the 1928 Pearce Coin

Similarly to Anscombe, Sutherland also comments on the likelihood of a leader to declare himself (or be declared) Caesar. He writes, "The title "Caesar" is regularly used down to the time of Julian. Thereafter it lapsed. ... If (like Evans) we wish to regard such coins ... as deliberate issues of particular rulers, then we assuredly must distinguish a time when the title "Caesar" was recognized and current..." Lastly, he remarks that, "The inspiration of the obverse types is Constantinian, i.e., that of the mid-fourth century: so, too, is that of the reverses." Between these, Sutherland concludes that these coins only shortly succeeded the issue of the official types: 350-360 AD. This would mean that the CONXT (or variant) on these coins' reverses referred not to Constantine III, but to either Constantius II or Constans.

Although Sutherland staunchly disagreed with Anscombe's reinterpretations of every coin as Censorius/Censeris, he would acknowledge that the 1928 Pearce coin indisputably does not refer to the name Carausius. To this end, he would regard Carausius and Censorius/Censeris as separate people, possibly two among several others.

It should be noted to anyone reading the original papers that there appears to be an error in the plate provided for these coins. The sixth coin shown, whose textual description matches that of the Pearce coin, instead shows an unrelated and undiscussed coin that does not appear to be of the Carausius/Censeris series.

=== Stevens (1956) ===
C. E. Stevens attempted to expand upon Sutherland's work in 1956, intending to confirm his chronology, as well as looking to analyze the political circumstances that may have allowed this hypothetical usurpation to occur.

A hoard discovered in 1948, which could be confidently dated to 355 AD at the latest, contained three coins of the supposed usurper. This, as Mattingly would celebrate in his publication of the hoard, proved Sutherland's original proposed chronology. Its discovery prompted Stevens to further investigate the specific circumstances, primarily surrounding Magnentius' usurpation in 353, that may have allowed a usurpation to occur in Britain.

Carausius' supposed title of Caesar, while more sensical in the fourth century than the fifth, is still rather unusual for a completely independent usurper, as it implies some level of subservience to a more senior Augustus. On this, Stevens drew parallels to Vetranio, writing, "There is numismatic evidence to suggest that at this stage Vetranio contented himself with the title of Caesar, thus recognizing the primacy of Constantius as Augustus, and only assumed that of Augustus when pressure from Magnentius forced him to declare himself, whether seriously or not, against Constantius." The numismatic evidence that Stevens cites here is a single, unique coin, whose legends declare "VETRANIO NOB CAES" (Vetranio, most noble Caesar). While the coin's authenticity had been questioned by previous authors, he dismissed these claims as "not justified."

Stevens would further cite the contemporary work of Ammianus Marcellinus, who discusses the activities of Paulus following Constantius' defeat of Magnentius in 353. In late 353, Paulus was reportedly sent to punish several British militares accused of conspiring for Magnentius. Stevens speculates here that this "conspiracy" may have involved the army's illegal overthrow of Carausius II, whom he proposed could have been a legitimately-appointed Comes in Britain.

=== Kent (1957) ===
John Kent published the next major paper, where he helped to narrow the possible dating of these coins to the currently-accepted range of 354-358 AD. In this, he would publish a new coin, found near Stroud, as well as completely refute the "legitimate appointee" claims made by Stevens the previous year.

Kent would attempt to refine the dates primarily through presence/absence of similar coins in relevant, datable coin hoards. Like Sutherland, he would compare the modules of the known corpus (which had risen to at least 14 coins by this time) to official pieces, as well as drawing parallels to similar imitations of Magnentius. With these, he would conclude that the official smaller-module "fallen horseman" coin only began being issued in 353, with the "Carausius II" pieces (and other stylistically-linked imitations) following shortly after in 354. As for the terminal date, Kent looks at the undertypes of the many pieces which showed signs of overstriking. Several were overstruck on "GLORIA EXERCITVS" reverse types, but none (nor any similar overstruck imitations) were overstruck on the "SPES REIPVBLICE" reverse type, the latter of which can be definitively dated to after late 357 AD. As such, the terminal date for "Carausius II" coins is 358 AD.

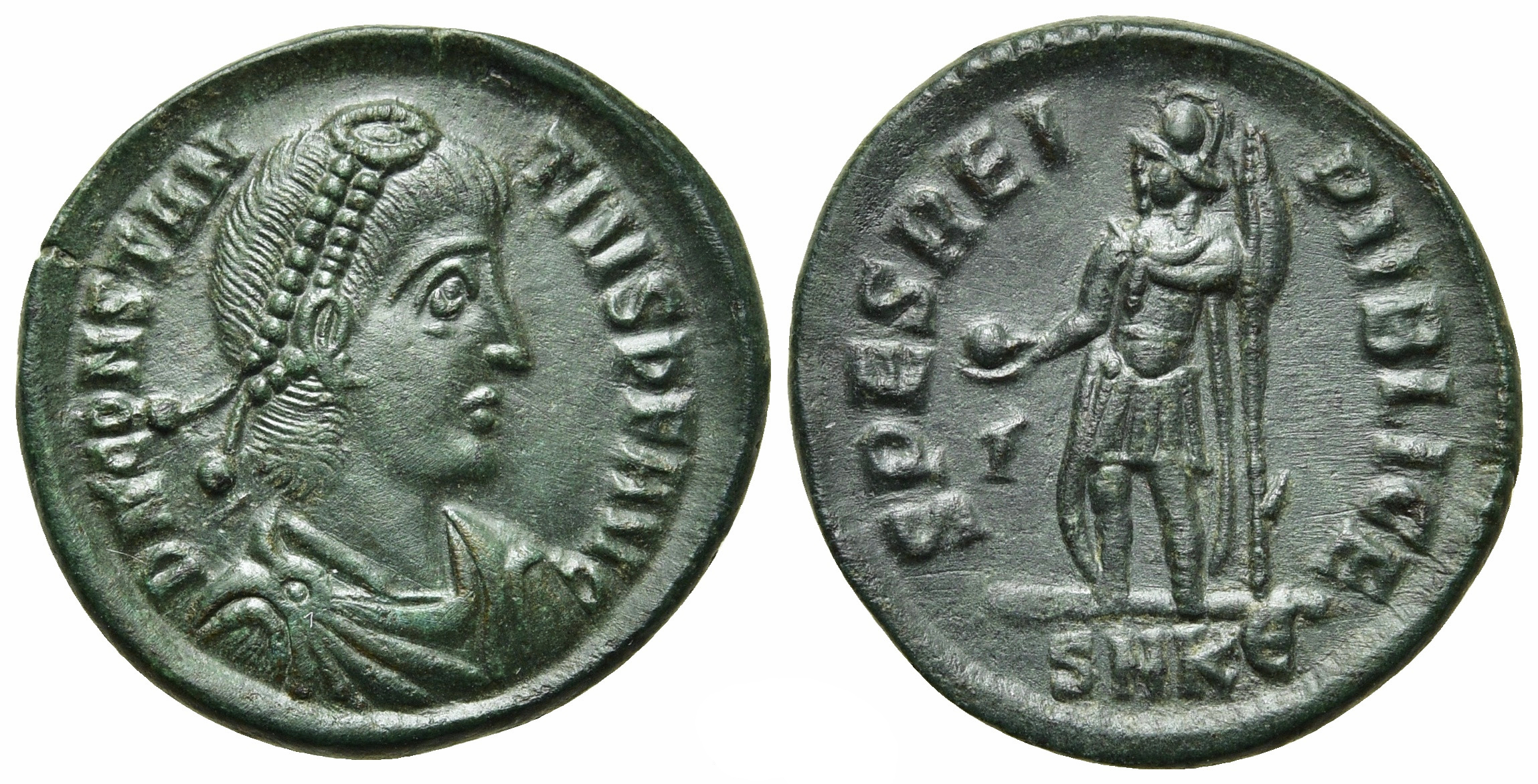
The "SPES REIBVBLICAE" reverse type.

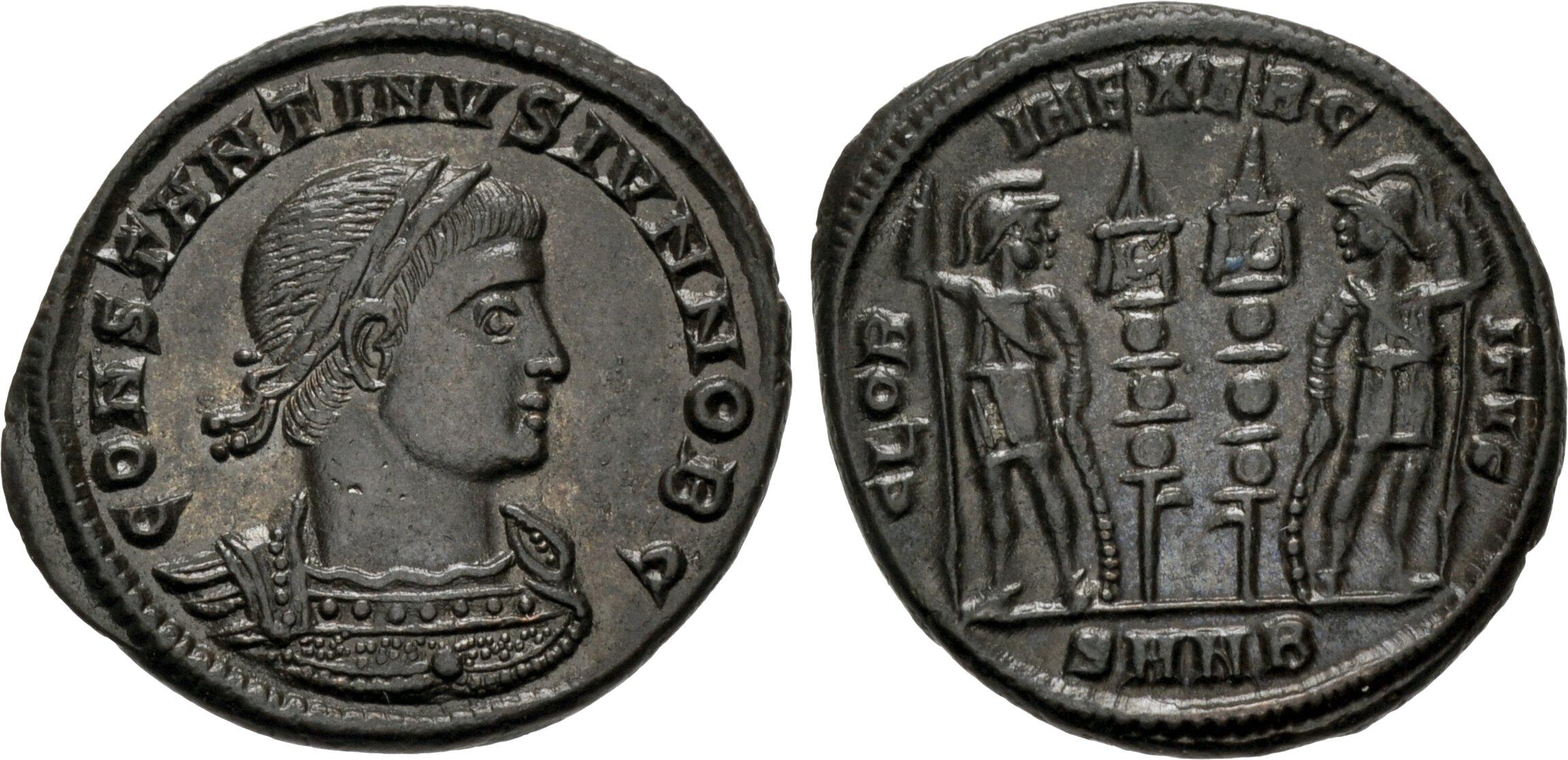
The "GLORIA EXERCITVS" reverse type.

Kent would mention that the unique "Vetranio Caesar" coin, upon which much of Stevens' argument rests, is a tooled forgery made from a genuine Alexandrian coin of Constantius Gallus. He further argues that, even if this coin were genuine, its existence would comment more on the politics of Constantius II, as Vetranio never controlled the mint of Alexandria.

While Kent concludes that while the chronology of the known coins can be confidently dated to 354-358 AD, he writes that he does not believe they represent a tangible usurper or leader in Britain.
