= Chrysanthus (Roman governor) =

Chrysanthus was the name of a vicarius of Roman Britain probably in the period 395–406. Little is known about his governorship, except that he probably served under the emperor Honorius.

He was the son of a bishop of Constantinople and had been a consular governor of a province in Italy before being moved to Britain. Later, he himself became a sectarian bishop in Constantinople and was considered for the prefecture there. His high rank indicates that Britain was still considered an important imperial possession even in the later fourth century AD.
