= Laycock =

Laycock is an English surname, likely originating from the placename Lacock, in Wiltshire (which is pronounced Laycock) or Laycock in West Yorkshire.

According to the 1990 United States Census, Laycock is the 22,119th most common surname.

Notable people with this surname include:

- Bill Laycock, Australian rugby union player
- Craven Laycock, dean of Dartmouth College, 1911–1934
- David Laycock, English cricketer
- Donald Laycock, Australian linguist and anthropologist
- Donald Laycock (artist), Australian artist
- Douglas Laycock, American law professor
- Elias C. Laycock, Australian rower
- Fred Laycock, English footballer
- Gloria Laycock, British criminologist
- Henry Laycock, American politician
- Jason Laycock, Australian footballer
- Jimmye Laycock, American college football coach
- John Laycock, English rock climber and Singaporean lawyer
- John Laycock (Australian politician), an Australian politician
- Joseph Frederick Laycock, British soldier and Olympian
- Malcolm Laycock (1938–2009), British radio presenter and producer
- Mitsuki Laycock, Japanese-American singer-songwriter
- Robert Laycock, World War II British commando
- Robert Laycock (MP), English politician
- Samuel Laycock, English poet
- Scott Laycock, Australian golfer
- Steve Laycock, Canadian curler
- Stuart Laycock, British historian
- Thomas Laycock, English soldier and explorer
- Thomas Laycock (physiologist), English physiologist

== See also ==
- Lacock (disambiguation)
- Leacock (disambiguation)
