= Laura Scales =

American academic

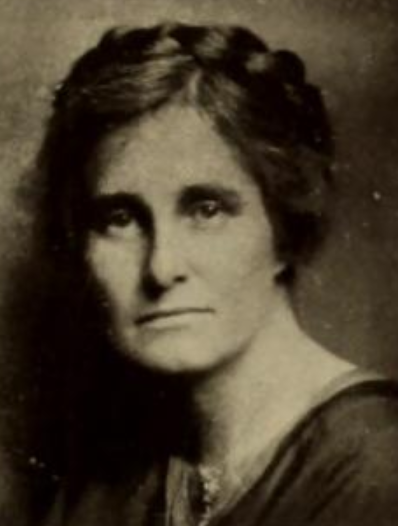
- Laura W. L. Scales, from the 1925 Smith College yearbook
- Born: November 13, 1879
- Died: June 12, 1990 (aged 110 years, 211 days)
- Occupation(s): College dean, educator
- Known for: Dean of Students, Smith College, 1922 to 1944

Laura Woolsey Lord Scales (November 13, 1879 – June 12, 1990) was an American educator, college dean and supercentenarian who served as the Dean of Students of Smith College from 1922 to 1944.

== Biography ==
Scales was the daughter of John King Lord (1848–1926), a historian who served as acting president of Dartmouth College in 1892 and 1893; her two brothers became a professor of anatomy and a publisher. She graduated from Smith College in 1901 and in 1908 married Robert Leighton Scales (1880–1912), a lawyer and former English instructor at Dartmouth who coauthored the debate book Argumentation and Debate. In 1913, after Scales' death, she became an instructor at Boston's Museum of Fine Arts, before resigning in 1920 to become dean of women at the Carnegie Institute of Technology. She then returned to Smith, where she served as dean of students for 22 years (1922–1944). In order to create a sense of community spirit, Scales instituted a policy that all students live on the campus.

Scales died in 1990 aged 110 years and 211 days, one of the oldest people in the world at the time. The Massachusetts legislature issued a resolution in honor of her 110th birthday in 1989. Her papers are archived at Smith College.

== Awards and honors ==
Smith gave Scales an honorary doctorate of humane letters in 1931, and Dartmouth College awarded her an honorary doctorate in literature eight years later. In 1936, Smith College named a newly built dormitory the Laura Scales House; notable residents have included Gloria Steinem.

== Selected publications ==
- Scales, Laura Woolsey Lord (1922). Boys of the Ages, their dreams and their crafts. [With illustrations.]. Boston: Ginn & Co.
- Scales, Laura W. L. (September 1917). "The Museum's Part in the Making of Americans". The Metropolitan Museum of Art Bulletin. 12 (9): 191–193. doi:10.2307/3253390. JSTOR 3253390.
- Scales, Laura W. L. (April 1922). "Shall We Fear the Large College?". Educational Review. 63: 299–306.
