= Lacock (disambiguation) =

Lacock is a village and civil parish in the county of Wiltshire, England.

Lacock or LaCock may also refer to:

== People ==
- Joanne Dru (1922–1996), born Joan Letitia LaCock, American film and television actress
- Abner Lacock (1770–1837), American surveyor, civil engineer, and politician
- Pete LaCock (b. 1952), American professional baseball player
- Peter Marshall (entertainer) (b. 1926), born Ralph Pierre LaCock, American entertainer
- Divan La Cock (b. 2003), Namibian cricketer

== Other uses ==
- Lacock Abbey, an historic house in Lacock, Wiltshire, England
- Lacock Abbey (monastery), a former monastery in Lacock, Wiltshire, England

== See also ==
- Lacock Cup
- Laycock, a surname
- Laycock, West Yorkshire
- Leacock (disambiguation)
