= Roman Britain =

Britain under Roman rule (43 AD – c. 410 AD)

Province of Britain Provincia Britannia (Latin)
- Province of the Roman Empire
- 43 AD–c. 410
- Province of Britain in the Roman Empire in 125 AD
- Capital: Camulodunum; Londinium
- Historical era: Classical antiquity
  - Annexed by Claudius: 43 AD
  - Severan Division: c. 197
  - Early fourth century Division: c. 312
  - End of Roman rule: c. 410
Preceded by	Succeeded by
British Iron Age	Sub-Roman Britain
- Today part of: United Kingdom; England; Wales; Scotland

Roman Britain was the territory that became the Roman province of Britannia after the Roman conquest of Britain, consisting of a large part of the island of Great Britain. The occupation lasted from 43 AD to 410 AD.

Britain was invaded by Julius Caesar in 55 and 54 BC as part of the Gallic Wars. According to Caesar, the Britons had been overrun or culturally assimilated by the Belgae during the British Iron Age and had been aiding Caesar's enemies. The Belgae were the only Celtic tribe to cross the sea into Britain, for to all other Celtic tribes this land was unknown. Caesar received tribute, installed the Celtic king Mandubracius over the Trinovantes, and returned to Gaul. Planned invasions under Augustus were called off in 34, 27, and 25 BC. In 40 AD, Caligula assembled 200,000 men at the Channel on the continent, only to have them gather seashells (musculi) according to Suetonius, perhaps as a symbolic gesture to proclaim Caligula's victory over the sea. Three years later, Claudius directed four legions to invade Britain and restore the exiled king Verica over the Atrebates. The Romans defeated the Catuvellauni, and then organized their conquests as the province of Britain. By 47 AD, the Romans held the lands southeast of the Fosse Way. Control over Wales was delayed by reverses and the effects of Boudica's uprising, but the Romans expanded steadily northwards.

The conquest of Britain continued under command of Gnaeus Julius Agricola (77–84 AD), who expanded the Roman Empire as far as Caledonia. In mid-84 AD, Agricola faced the armies of the Caledonians, led by Calgacus, at the Battle of Mons Graupius. Battle casualties were estimated by Tacitus to be upwards of 10,000 on the Caledonian side and about 360 on the Roman side. The bloodbath at Mons Graupius concluded the forty-year conquest of Britain, a period that possibly saw between 100,000 and 250,000 Britons killed. In the context of pre-industrial warfare and of a total population of Britain of c. 2 million, these are very high figures.

Under the 2nd-century emperors Hadrian and Antoninus Pius, two walls were built to defend the Roman province from the Caledonians, Hadrian’s Wall and the Antonine Wall, the first of stone and the second largely of turf. The first is the better preserved. Around 197 AD, the Severan Reforms divided Britain into two provinces: Britannia Superior and Britannia Inferior. In the early fourth century, Britannia was divided into four provinces under the direction of a vicarius, who administered the Diocese of the Britains, and who was himself under the overall authority of the praetorian prefecture of the Gallic region, based at Trier. A fifth province, Valentia, is attested in the later 4th century. For much of the later period of the Roman occupation, Britannia was subject to barbarian invasions and often came under the control of imperial usurpers and imperial pretenders. The final Roman withdrawal from Britain occurred around 410 AD; the native kingdoms are considered to have formed Sub-Roman Britain after that.

Following the conquest of the Britons, a distinctive Romano-British culture emerged as the Romans introduced improved agriculture, urban planning, industrial production, and architecture. The Roman goddess Britannia became the female personification of Britain. After the initial invasions, Roman historians generally only mention Britain in passing. Thus, most present knowledge derives from archaeological investigations and occasional epigraphic evidence lauding the Britannic achievements of an emperor. Roman citizens settled in Britain from many parts of the Empire.

== History ==
=== Early contact ===
Britain had trading links with the Mediterranean world for centuries before the Roman conquest. The tin deposits in Cornwall and Devon in the southwest of Britain are one of the richest in Europe. Tin was used to make bronze and Britain played an important role in supplying it during the Bronze Age. Diodorus Siculus claims in Bibliotheca Historica that the centre of the tin trade was the island of Ictis. This claim is likely transmitted via Posidonius from a now lost text by the Greek explorer Pytheas who travelled to Britain around 320 BC. (Note: Britain might also have been visited earlier by the Carthaginian sailor Himilco. He undertook a voyage of exploration in the 5th century BC. But his account survives only secondhand in the writings of Avienius and Pliny the elder. T. A. Rickard interpreted these accounts as evidence that Himilco reached Britain, but this reading has been challenged. Barry Cunliffe writes that Himlico’s intention was to sail west of the Mediterranean) Britain was regarded as a place of mystery, with some writers such as Strabo, doubting it existed. Herodotus had heard of Cassiterides, or “tin islands” which may have been Britain, but he did not know if they were real.

The first direct Roman contact was when Julius Caesar undertook two expeditions in 55 and 54 BC, as part of his conquest of Gaul, believing the Britons were helping the Gallic resistance. The first expedition was more a reconnaissance than a full invasion and gained a foothold on the coast of Kent but was unable to advance further because of storm damage to the ships and a lack of cavalry. Despite the military failure, it was a political success, with the Roman Senate declaring a 20-day public holiday in Rome to honour the unprecedented achievement of obtaining hostages from Britain and defeating Belgic tribes on returning to the continent.

The second invasion involved a substantially larger force and Caesar coerced or invited many of the native Celtic tribes to pay tribute and give hostages in return for peace. A friendly local king, Mandubracius, was installed, and his rival, Cassivellaunus, was brought to terms. Hostages were taken, but historians disagree over whether any tribute was paid after Caesar returned to Gaul.

Caesar conquered no territory and left no troops behind, but he established clients and brought Britain into Rome's sphere of influence. Augustus planned invasions in 34, 27 and 25 BC, but circumstances were never favourable, and the relationship between Britain and Rome settled into one of diplomacy and trade. Strabo, writing late in Augustus's reign, claimed that taxes on trade brought in more annual revenue than any conquest could. Archaeology shows that there was an increase in imported luxury goods in southeastern Britain. Strabo also mentions British kings who sent embassies to Augustus, and Augustus's own Res Gestae refers to two British kings he received as refugees. When some of Tiberius's ships were carried to Britain in a storm during his campaigns in Germany in 16 AD, they came back with tales of monsters.

Rome appears to have encouraged a balance of power in southern Britain, supporting two powerful kingdoms: the Catuvellauni, ruled by the descendants of Tasciovanus, and the Atrebates, ruled by the descendants of Commius. This policy was followed until 39 or 40 AD, when Caligula received an exiled member of the Catuvellaunian dynasty and planned an invasion of Britain that collapsed in farcical circumstances before it left Gaul. When Claudius successfully invaded in 43 AD, it was in aid of another fugitive British ruler, Verica of the Atrebates.

=== Roman invasion ===
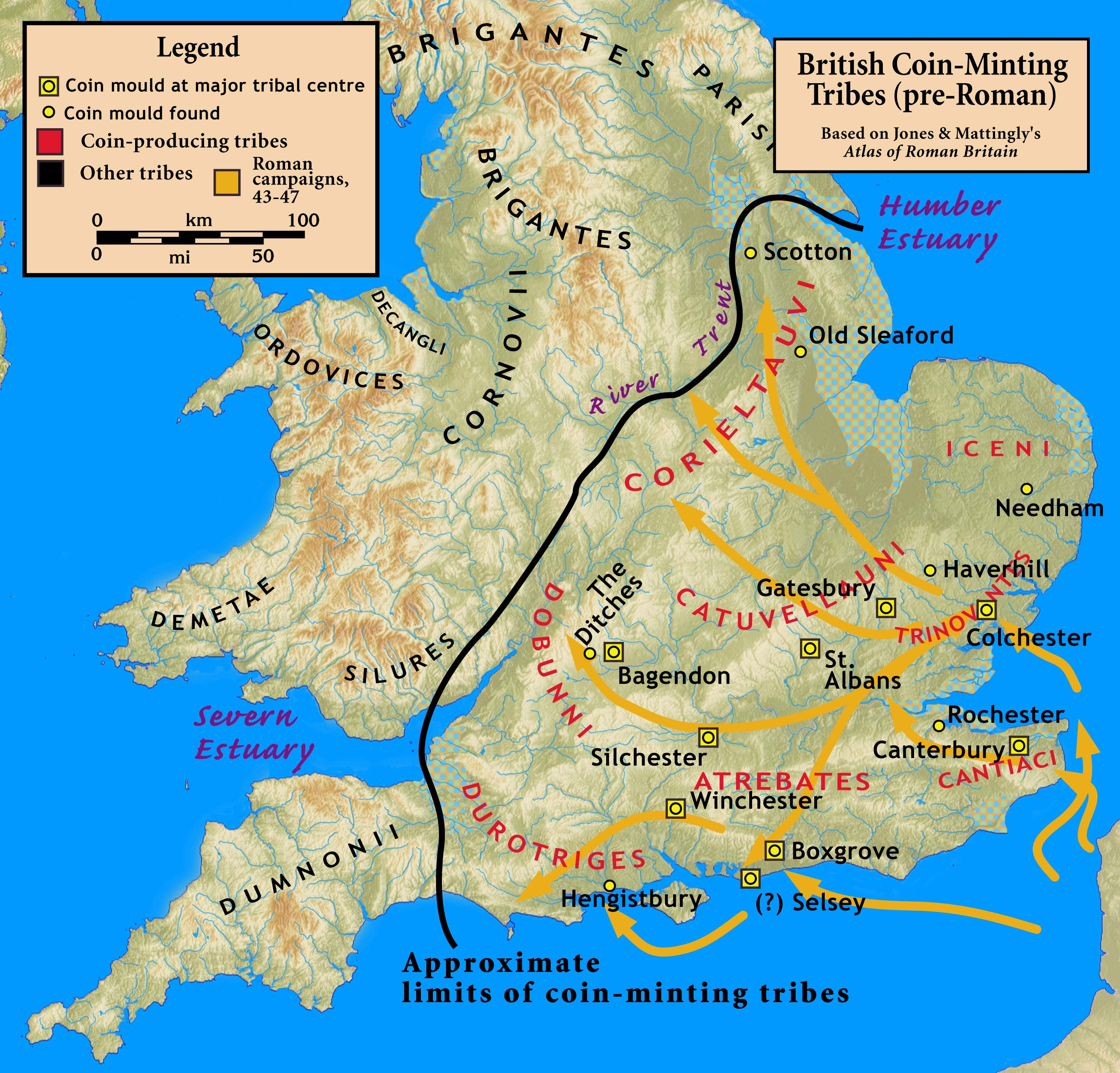
Conquests under Aulus Plautius, focused on the commercially valuable southeast of Britain

The invasion force in 43 AD was led by Aulus Plautius, but it is unclear how many legions were sent. The Legio II Augusta, commanded by future emperor Vespasian, was the only one directly attested to have taken part. The Legio IX Hispana, the XIV Gemina (later styled Martia Victrix) and the XX (later styled Valeria Victrix) are known to have served during the Boudican revolt of 60/61 AD, and were probably there since the initial invasion. This is not certain because the Roman army was flexible, with units being moved around whenever necessary. The IX Hispana may have been permanently stationed, with records showing it at Eboracum (York) in 71 AD and on a building inscription there dated 108 AD, before being destroyed in the east of the Empire, possibly during the Bar Kokhba revolt.

The invasion was delayed by a troop mutiny until an imperial freedman persuaded them to overcome their fear of crossing the Ocean and campaigning beyond the limits of the known world. They sailed in three divisions, and probably landed at Richborough in Kent; at least part of the force may have landed near Fishbourne, West Sussex.

The Catuvellauni and their allies were defeated in two battles: the first, assuming a Richborough landing, on the river Medway, the second on the river Thames. One of their leaders, Togodumnus, was killed but his brother Caratacus survived to continue resistance elsewhere. Plautius halted at the Thames and sent for Claudius, who arrived with reinforcements, including artillery and elephants, for the final march to the Catuvellaunian capital, Camulodunum (Colchester). Vespasian subdued the southwest, Cogidubnus was set up as a friendly king of several territories, and treaties were made with tribes outside direct Roman control.

=== Establishment of Roman rule ===
Roman invasion of Britain
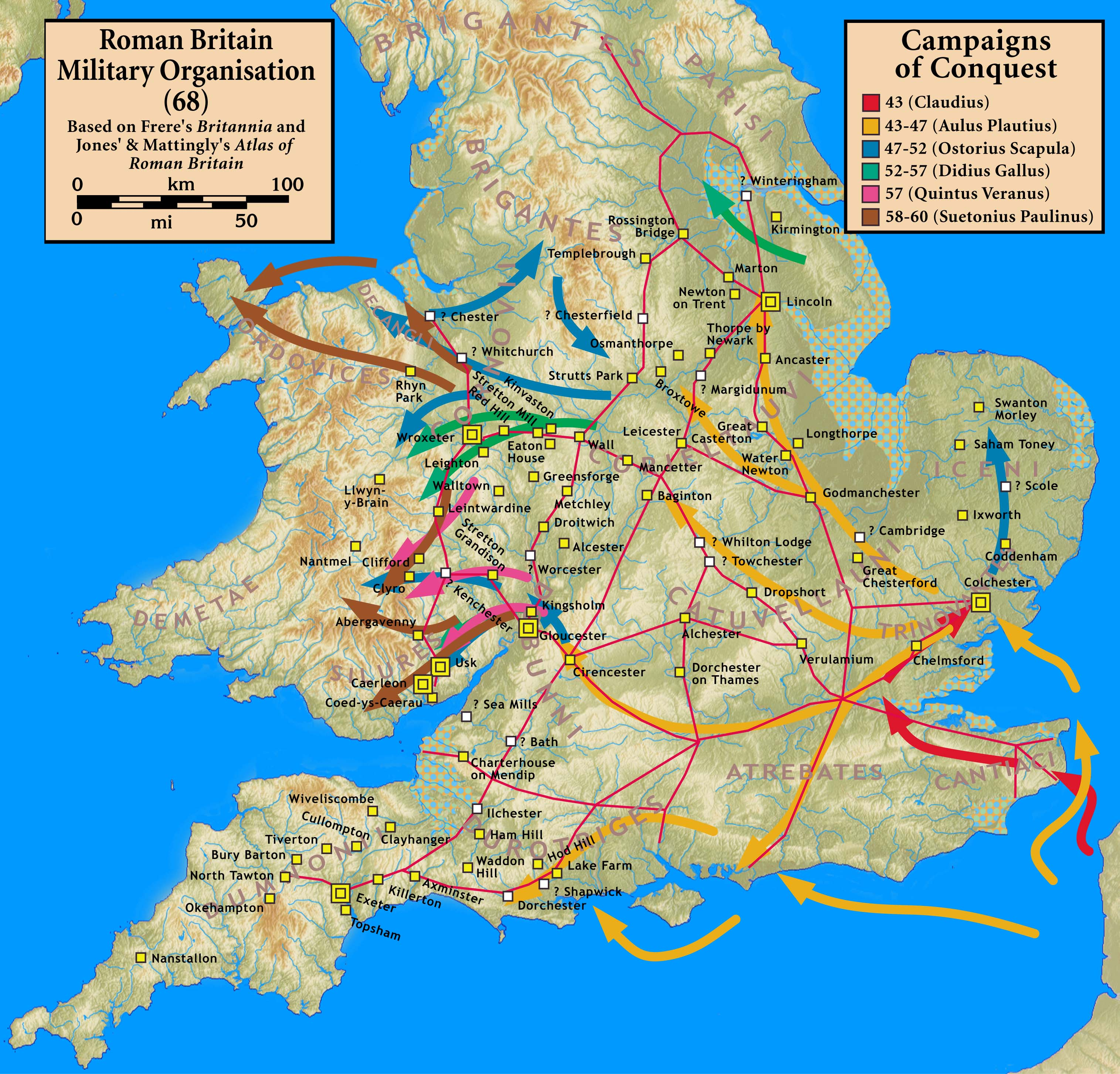
Roman campaigns 43–60 AD

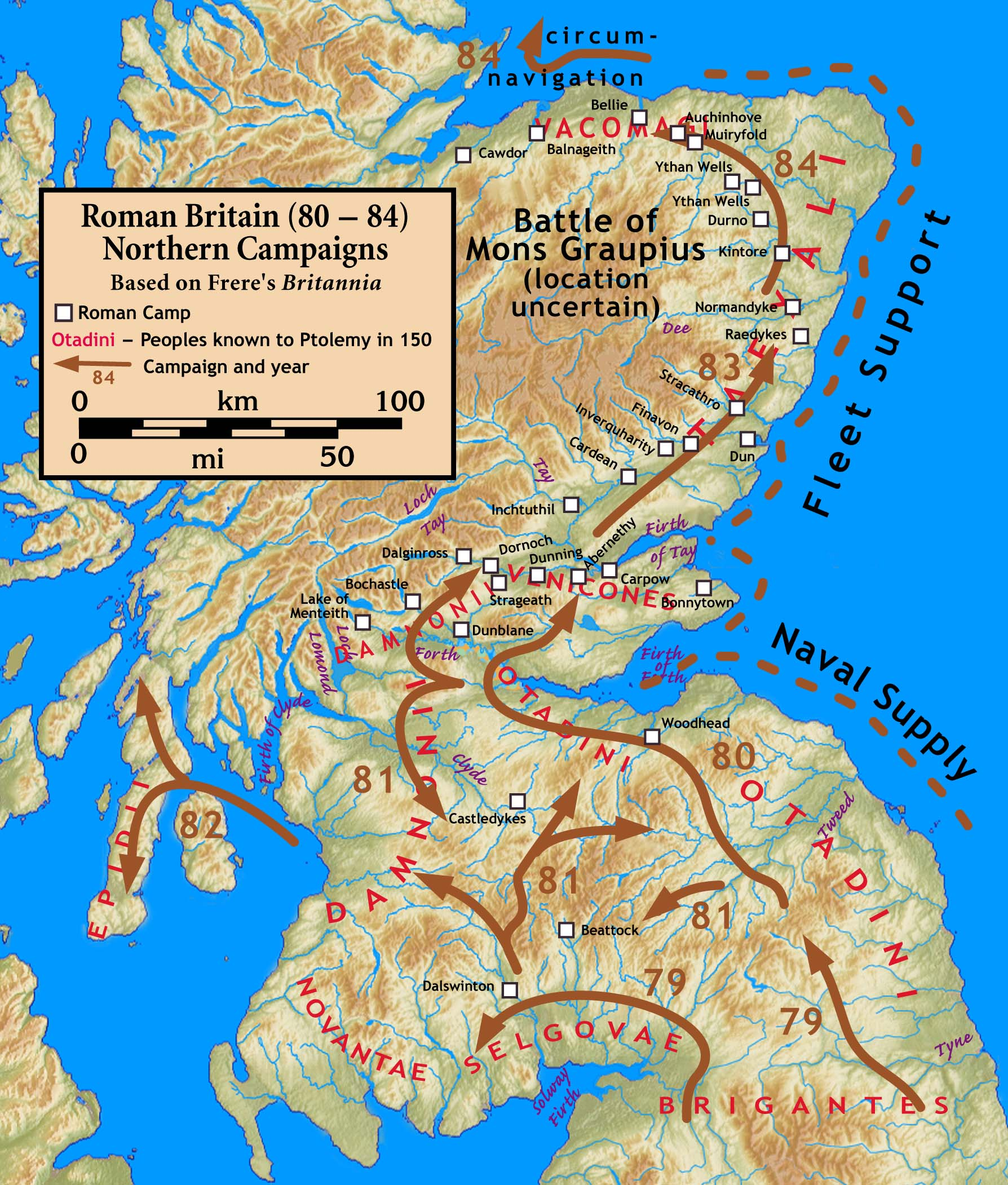
Agricola's campaigns 80-84 AD

After capturing the south of the island, the Romans turned their attention to what is now Wales. The Silures, Ordovices and Deceangli remained implacably opposed to the invaders and for the first few decades were the focus of Roman military attention, despite occasional minor revolts among Roman allies like the Brigantes and the Iceni. The Silures were led by Caratacus, and he carried out an effective guerrilla campaign against Governor Publius Ostorius Scapula.

In 51 AD, Ostorius lured Caratacus into a set-piece battle and defeated him. The British leader sought refuge among the Brigantes, but their queen, Cartimandua, proved her loyalty by surrendering him to the Romans. He was brought as a captive to Rome, where a dignified speech he made during Claudius's triumph persuaded the emperor to spare his life. The Silures were still not pacified, and Cartimandua's ex-husband Venutius replaced Caratacus as the most prominent leader of British resistance.

On Nero's accession, Roman Britain extended as far north as Lindum. Gaius Suetonius Paulinus, the conqueror of Mauretania (modern day Algeria and Morocco), then became governor of Britain, and in 60 and 61 he moved against Mona (Anglesey) to settle accounts with Druidism once and for all. Paulinus led his army across the Menai Strait and massacred the Druids and burnt their sacred groves.

While Paulinus was campaigning in Mona, the southeast of Britain rose in revolt under the leadership of Boudica. She was the widow of the recently deceased king of the Iceni, Prasutagus. The Roman historian Tacitus reports that Prasutagus had left a will leaving half his kingdom to Nero in the hope that the remainder would be left untouched. He was wrong. When his will was enforced, Rome responded by violently seizing the tribe's lands in full. Boudica protested. In consequence, Roman officials punished her and her daughters by flogging and rape. In response, the Iceni, joined by the Trinovantes, destroyed the Roman colony at Camulodunum (Colchester) and routed defeated the part of the IXth Legion that was sent to relieve it.

Paulinus rode to London (then called Londinium), the rebels' next target, but concluded it could not be defended. Abandoned, it was destroyed, as was Verulamium (St. Albans). Between seventy and eighty thousand people are said to have been killed in the three cities. But Paulinus regrouped with two of the three legions still available to him, chose a battlefield, and, despite being outnumbered by more than twenty to one, defeated the rebels in the Battle of Watling Street. Boudica died not long afterwards, by self-administered poison or by illness. During this time, the Emperor Nero considered withdrawing Roman forces from Britain altogether.

Templeborough Roman fort in South Yorkshire. The reconstruction was created for Rotherham Museums and Galleries.

There was further turmoil in 69, the "Year of the Four Emperors". As civil war raged in Rome, weak governors were unable to control the legions in Britain, and Venutius of the Brigantes seized his chance. The Romans had previously defended Cartimandua against him, but this time were unable to do so. Cartimandua was evacuated, and Venutius was left in control of the north of the country. After Vespasian secured the empire, his first two appointments as governor, Quintus Petillius Cerialis and Sextus Julius Frontinus, took on the task of subduing the Brigantes and Silures respectively. Frontinus extended Roman rule to all of South Wales, and initiated exploitation of the mineral resources, such as the gold mines at Dolaucothi.

In the following years, the Romans conquered more of the island, increasing the size of Roman Britain. Governor Gnaeus Julius Agricola, father-in-law to the historian Tacitus, conquered the Ordovices in 78. With the XX Valeria Victrix legion, Agricola defeated the Caledonians in 84 at the Battle of Mons Graupius, in north-east Scotland. This was the high-water mark of Roman territory in Britain: shortly after his victory, Agricola was recalled from Britain back to Rome and awarded the ornaments of a triumph, before returning to continue as governor. By 87 the decision was taken to abandon most of the land north of the Cheviot Hills allowing for troops to be moved to other frontiers which were under pressure. Tacitus reports Agricola as feeling bitter about this turn of events.

For much of the history of Roman Britain, a large number of soldiers were garrisoned on the island. This required that the emperor station a trusted senior man as governor of the province. As a result, many future emperors served as governors or legates in this province, including Vespasian, Pertinax, and Gordian I.

Roman military organisation in the north
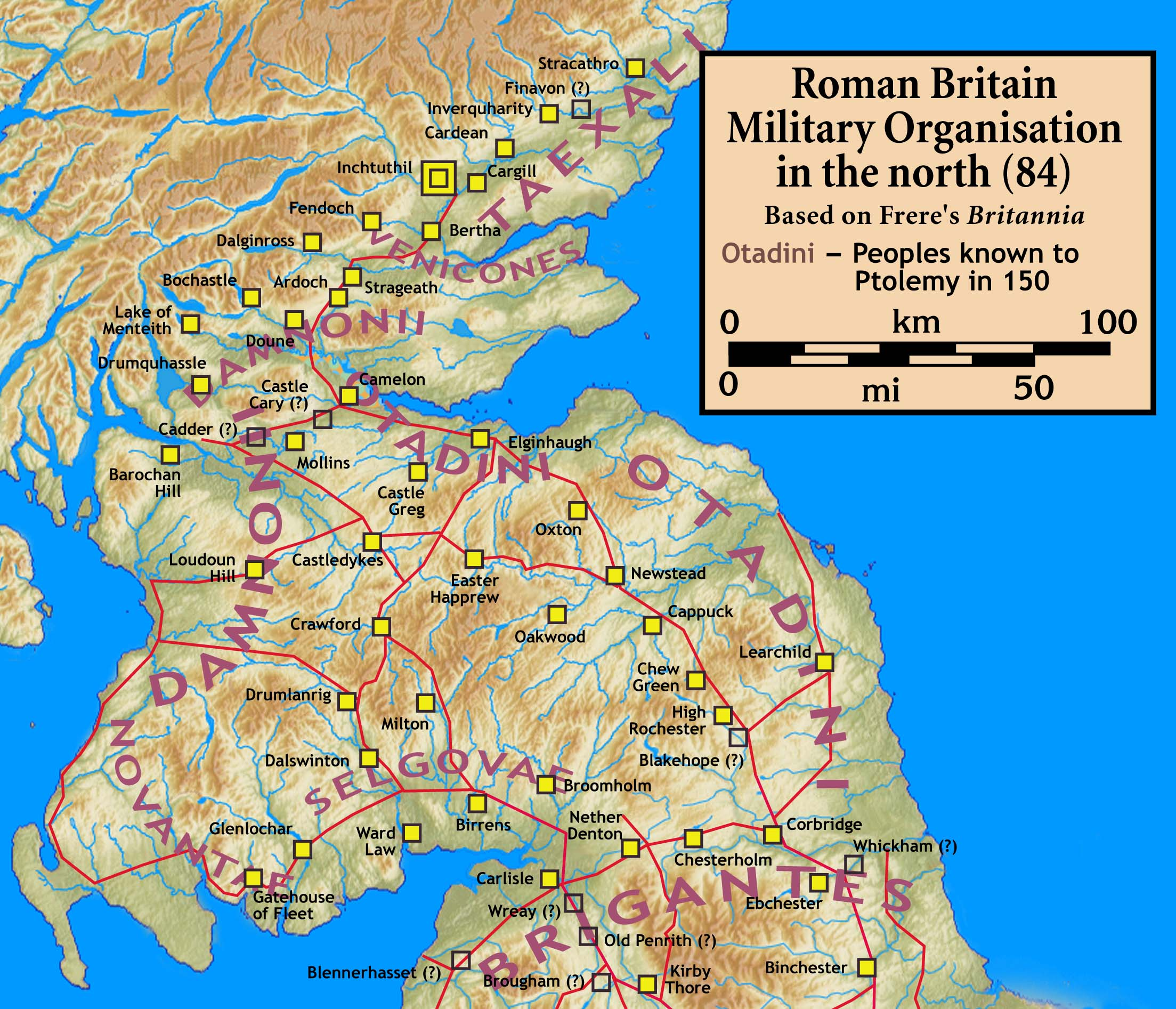
In 84 AD

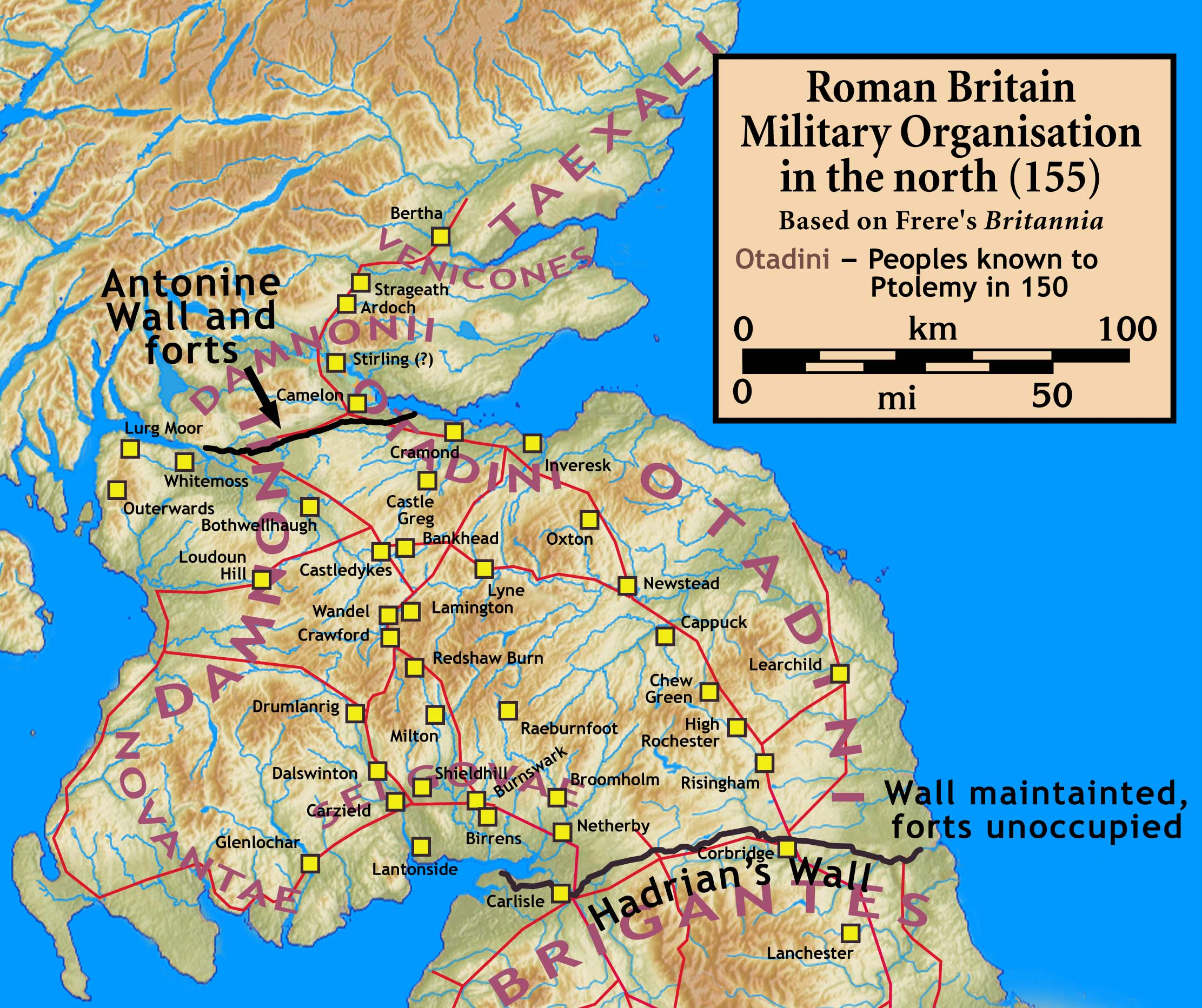
In 155 AD

=== Occupation of and retreat from southern Scotland ===
There is no historical source describing the decades that followed Agricola's recall. Even the name of his replacement is unknown. Archaeology has shown that some Roman forts south of the Forth–Clyde isthmus were rebuilt and enlarged; others appear to have been abandoned. By 87 the frontier had been consolidated on the Stanegate. Roman coins and pottery have been found circulating at native settlement sites in the Scottish Lowlands in the years before 100, indicating growing Romanisation. Some of the most important sources for this era are the writing tablets from the fort at Vindolanda in Northumberland, mostly dating to 90–110. These tablets provide evidence for the operation of a Roman fort at the edge of the Roman Empire, where officers' wives maintained polite society while merchants, hauliers and military personnel kept the fort operational and supplied.

Around 105 there appears to have been a serious setback at the hands of the tribes of the Picts: several Roman forts were destroyed by fire, with human remains and damaged armour at Trimontium (at modern Newstead, in SE Scotland) indicating hostilities at least at that site. There is also circumstantial evidence that auxiliary reinforcements were sent from Germany, and an unnamed British war of the period is mentioned on the gravestone of a tribune of Cyrene. Trajan's Dacian Wars may have led to troop reductions in the area or even total withdrawal followed by slighting of the forts by the Picts rather than an unrecorded military defeat. The Romans were also in the habit of destroying their own forts during an orderly withdrawal, in order to deny resources to an enemy. In either case, the frontier probably moved south to the line of the Stanegate at the Solway–Tyne isthmus around this time.

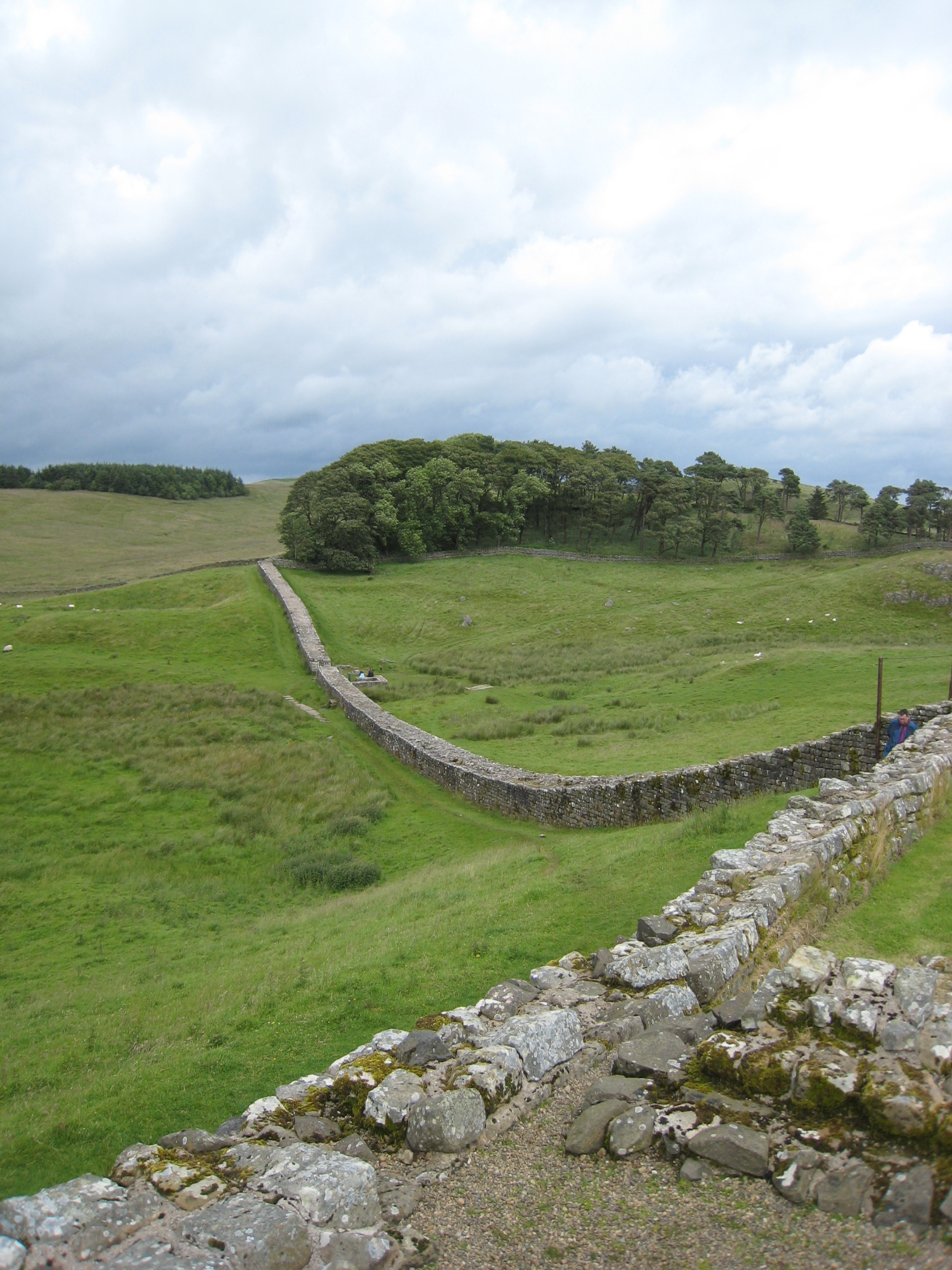
Hadrian's Wall viewed looking east from Housesteads Roman Fort (Vercovicium). The wall in the background has been consolidated.

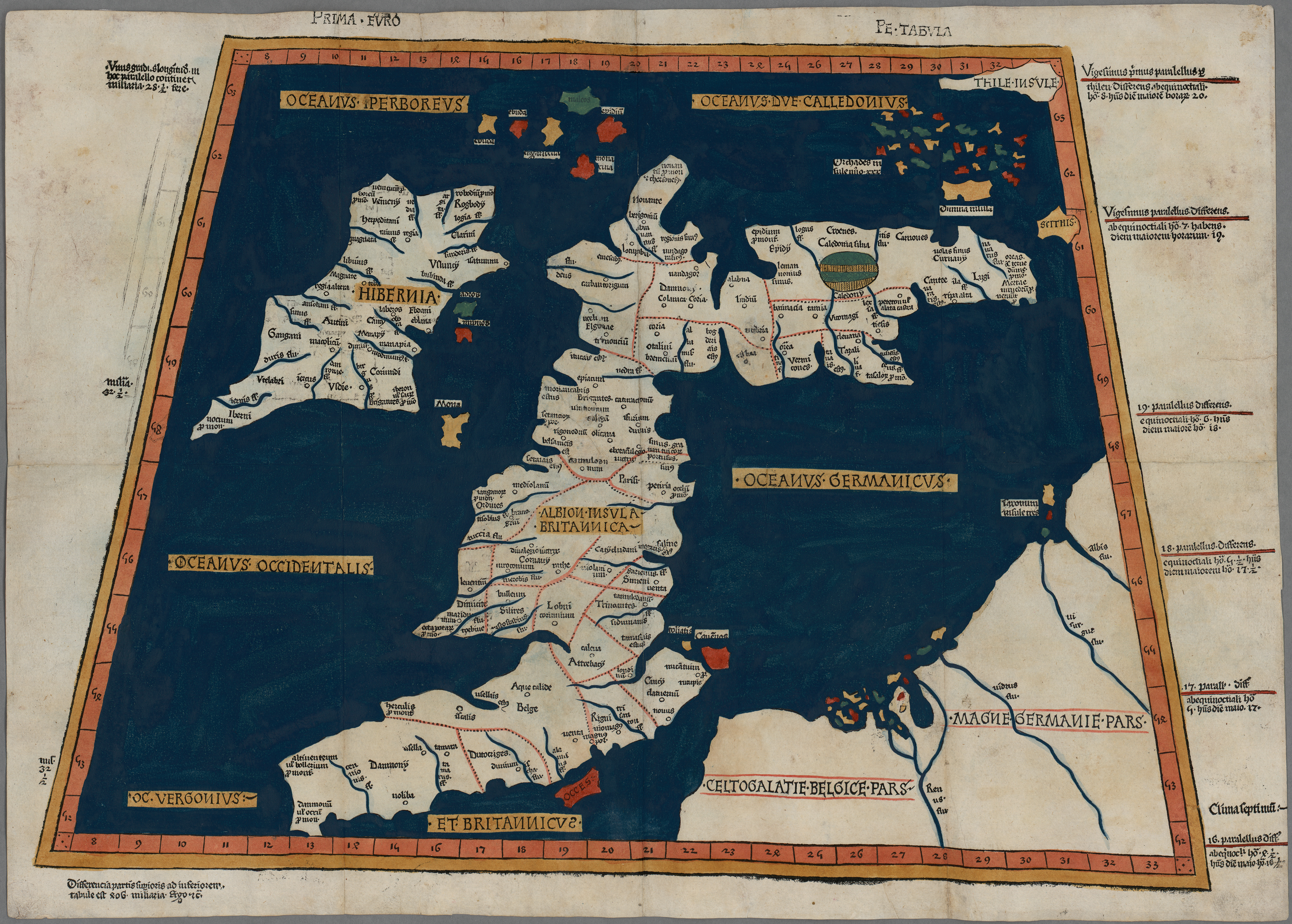
Prima Europe tabula. A 1486 woodcut copy of Ptolemy's 2nd-century map of Roman Britain

A new crisis occurred at the beginning of Hadrian's reign (117): a rising in the north which was suppressed by Quintus Pompeius Falco. When Hadrian reached Britannia on his famous tour of the Roman provinces around 120, he directed an extensive defensive wall, known to posterity as Hadrian's Wall, to be built close to the line of the Stanegate frontier. Hadrian appointed Aulus Platorius Nepos as governor to undertake this work who brought the Legio VI Victrix legion with him from Germania Inferior. This replaced the famous Legio IX Hispana, whose disappearance has been discussed previously. Archaeology indicates considerable political instability in Scotland during the first half of the 2nd century, and the shifting frontier at this time should be seen in this context.

In the reign of Antoninus Pius (138–161) the Hadrianic border was briefly extended north to the Forth–Clyde isthmus, where the Antonine Wall was built around 142 following the military reoccupation of the Scottish lowlands by a new governor, Quintus Lollius Urbicus.

The first Antonine occupation of Scotland ended as a result of a further crisis in 155–157, when the Brigantes revolted. With limited options to despatch reinforcements, the Romans moved their troops south, and this rising was suppressed by Governor Gnaeus Julius Verus. Within a year the Antonine Wall was recaptured, but by 163 or 164 it was abandoned. The second occupation was probably connected with Antoninus's undertakings to protect the Votadini or his pride in enlarging the empire, since the retreat to the Hadrianic frontier occurred not long after his death when a more objective strategic assessment of the benefits of the Antonine Wall could be made. The Romans did not entirely withdraw from Scotland at this time: the large fort at Newstead was maintained along with seven smaller outposts until at least 180.

During the twenty-year period following the reversion of the frontier to Hadrian's Wall in 163/4, Rome was concerned with continental issues, primarily problems in the Danubian provinces. Increasing numbers of hoards of buried coins in Britain at this time indicate that peace was not entirely achieved. Sufficient Roman silver has been found in Scotland to suggest more than ordinary trade, and it is likely that the Romans were reinforcing treaty agreements by paying tribute to their implacable enemies, the Picts.

Under Marcus Aurelius, in 175, an army of Sarmatian cavalry, consisting of 5,500 men, arrived in Britannia. In 180, Hadrian's Wall was breached by the Picts and the commanding officer or governor was killed there in what Cassius Dio described as the most serious war of the reign of Commodus. Ulpius Marcellus was sent as replacement governor and by 184 he had won a new peace, only to be faced with a mutiny from his own troops. Unhappy with Marcellus's strictness, they tried to elect a legate named Priscus as usurper governor; he refused, but Marcellus was lucky to leave the province alive. The Roman army in Britannia continued its insubordination: they sent a delegation of 1,500 to Rome to demand the execution of Tigidius Perennis, a Praetorian prefect who they felt had earlier wronged them by posting lowly equites to legate ranks in Britannia. Commodus met the party outside Rome and agreed to have Perennis killed, but this only made them feel more secure in their mutiny.

The future emperor Pertinax (lived 126–193) was sent to Britannia to quell the mutiny and was initially successful in regaining control, but a riot broke out among the troops. Pertinax was attacked and left for dead, and asked to be recalled to Rome, where he briefly succeeded Commodus as emperor in 192.

=== Third century ===
The death of Commodus put into motion a series of events which eventually led to civil war. Following the short reign of Pertinax, several rivals for the role of emperor emerged, including Septimius Severus and Clodius Albinus. The latter was the new governor of Britannia, and had seemingly won the natives over after their earlier rebellions; he also controlled three legions, making him a potentially significant claimant. His sometime rival Severus promised him the title of Caesar in return for Albinus's support against Pescennius Niger in the east. Once Niger was neutralised, Severus turned on his ally in Britannia; it is likely that Albinus saw he would be the next target and was already preparing for war.

Albinus crossed to Gaul in 195, where the provinces were also sympathetic to him, and set up at Lugdunum. Severus arrived in February 196, and the ensuing battle was decisive. Albinus came close to victory, but Severus's reinforcements won the day, and the British governor committed suicide. Severus soon purged Albinus's sympathisers and perhaps confiscated large tracts of land in Britain as punishment. Albinus had demonstrated the major problem posed by Roman Britain. In order to maintain security, the province required the presence of three legions, but command of these forces provided an ideal power base for ambitious rivals. Deploying those legions elsewhere would strip the island of its garrison, leaving the province defenceless against uprisings by the native Celtic tribes and against invasion by the Picts and Scots.

The traditional view is that northern Britain descended into anarchy during Albinus's absence. Cassius Dio records that the new Governor, Virius Lupus, was obliged to buy peace from a fractious northern tribe known as the Maeatae. The succession of militarily distinguished governors who were subsequently appointed suggests that enemies of Rome were posing a difficult challenge, and Lucius Alfenus Senecio's report to Rome in 207 describes barbarians "rebelling, over-running the land, taking loot and creating destruction". In order to rebel, of course, one must be a subject – the Maeatae clearly did not consider themselves such. Senecio requested either reinforcements or an Imperial expedition, and Severus chose the latter, despite being 62 years old. Archaeological evidence shows that Senecio had been rebuilding the defences of Hadrian's Wall and the forts beyond it, and Severus's arrival in Britain prompted the enemy tribes to sue for peace immediately. The emperor had not come all that way to leave without a victory, and it is likely that he wished to provide his teenage sons Caracalla and Geta with first-hand experience of controlling a hostile barbarian land.

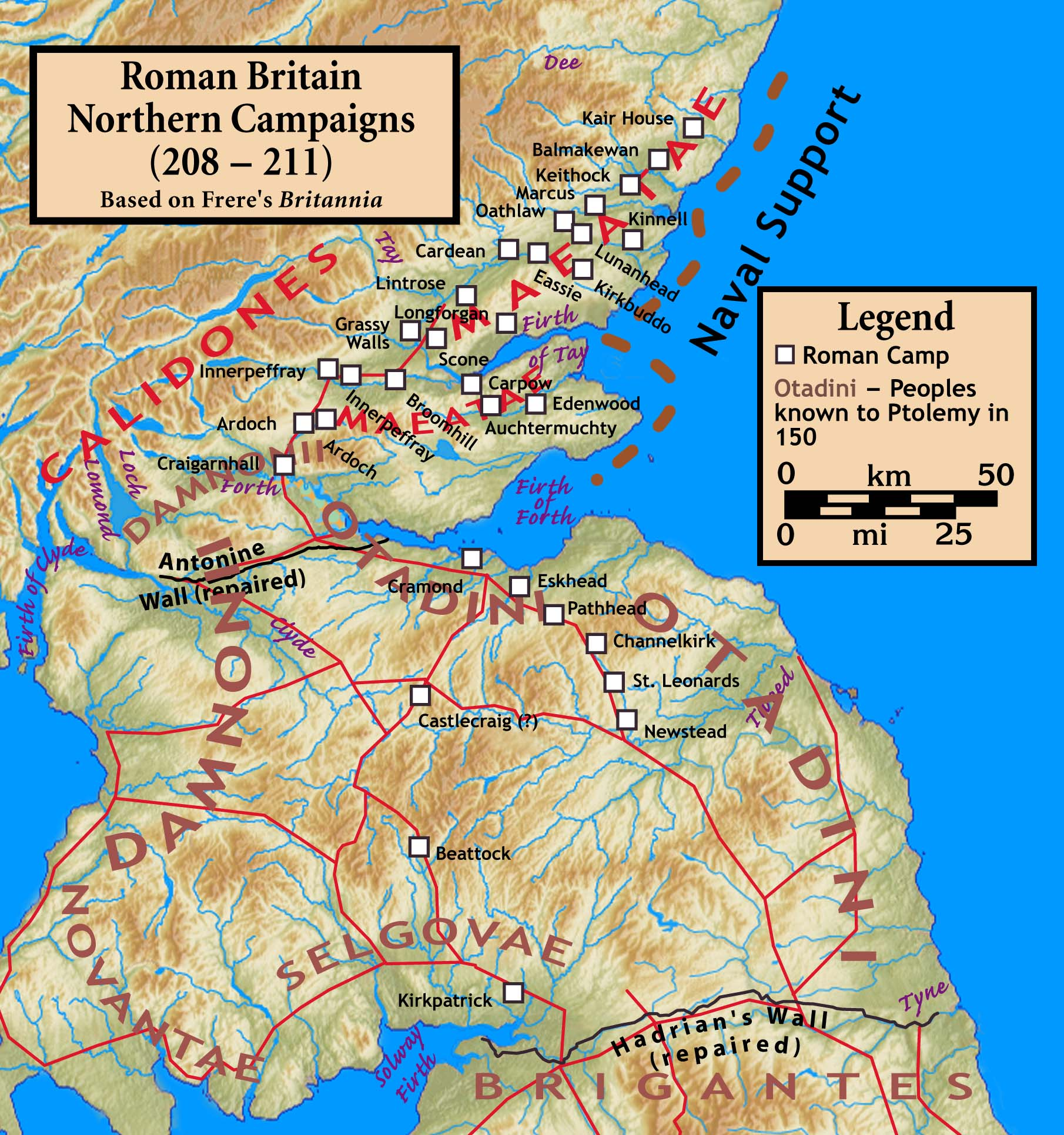
Northern campaigns, 208–211 AD

An invasion of Caledonia led by Severus and probably numbering around 20,000 troops moved north in 208 or 209, crossing the Wall and passing through eastern Scotland on a route similar to that used by Agricola. Harried by punishing guerrilla raids by the northern tribes and slowed by an unforgiving terrain, Severus was unable to meet the Caledonians on a battlefield. The emperor's forces pushed north as far as the River Tay, but little appears to have been achieved by the invasion, as peace treaties were signed with the Caledonians. By 210 Severus had returned to York, and the frontier had once again become Hadrian's Wall. He assumed the title Britannicus but the title meant little with regard to the unconquered lands of the north, which clearly remained outside the authority of the Empire. Almost immediately, another northern tribe, the Maeatae, went to war. Caracalla left with a punitive expedition, but by the following year his ailing father had died and he and his brother left the province to press their claim to the throne.

As one of his last acts, Severus tried to solve the problem of powerful and rebellious governors in Britain by dividing the province into Britannia Superior and Britannia Inferior. This kept the potential for rebellion in check for almost a century. Historical sources provide little information on the following decades, a period known as the Long Peace. Even so, the number of buried hoards found from this period rises, suggesting continuing unrest. A string of forts were built along the coast of southern Britain to control piracy; and over the following hundred years they increased in number, becoming the Saxon Shore Forts.

During the middle of the 3rd century, the Roman Empire was convulsed by barbarian invasions, rebellions and new imperial pretenders. Britannia apparently avoided these troubles, but increasing inflation had its economic effect. In 259 a so-called Gallic Empire was established when Postumus rebelled against Gallienus. Britannia was part of this until 274 when Aurelian reunited the empire.

Around the year 280, a half-British officer named Bonosus was in command of the Romans' Rhenish fleet when the Germans managed to burn it at anchor. To avoid punishment, he proclaimed himself emperor at Colonia Agrippina (Cologne) but was crushed by Marcus Aurelius Probus. Soon afterwards, an unnamed governor of one of the British provinces also attempted an uprising. Probus put it down by sending irregular troops of Vandals and Burgundians across the Channel.

The Carausian Revolt led to a short-lived Britannic Empire from 286 to 296. Carausius was a Menapian naval commander of the Britannic fleet; he revolted upon learning of a death sentence ordered by the emperor Maximian on charges of having abetted Frankish and Saxon pirates and having embezzled recovered treasure. He consolidated control over all the provinces of Britain and some of northern Gaul while Maximian dealt with other uprisings. An invasion in 288 failed to unseat him and an uneasy peace ensued, with Carausius issuing coins and inviting official recognition. In 293, the junior emperor Constantius Chlorus launched a second offensive, besieging the rebel port of Gesoriacum (Boulogne-sur-Mer) by land and sea. After it fell, Constantius attacked Carausius's other Gallic holdings and Frankish allies and Carausius was usurped by his treasurer, Allectus. Julius Asclepiodotus landed an invasion fleet near Southampton and defeated Allectus in a land battle.

=== Fourth-century government ===
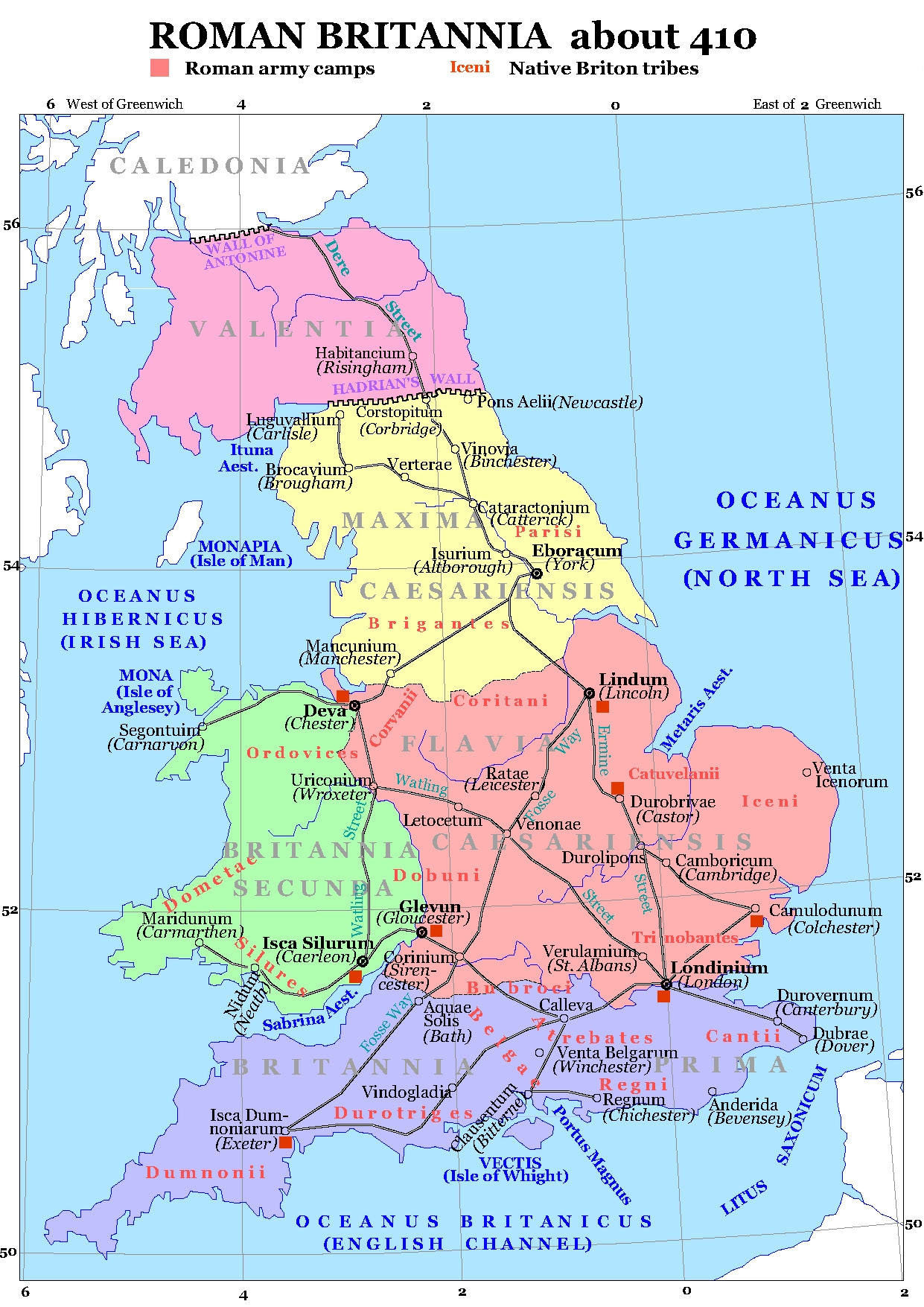
One possible arrangement of the late Roman provinces, with Valentia between the walls

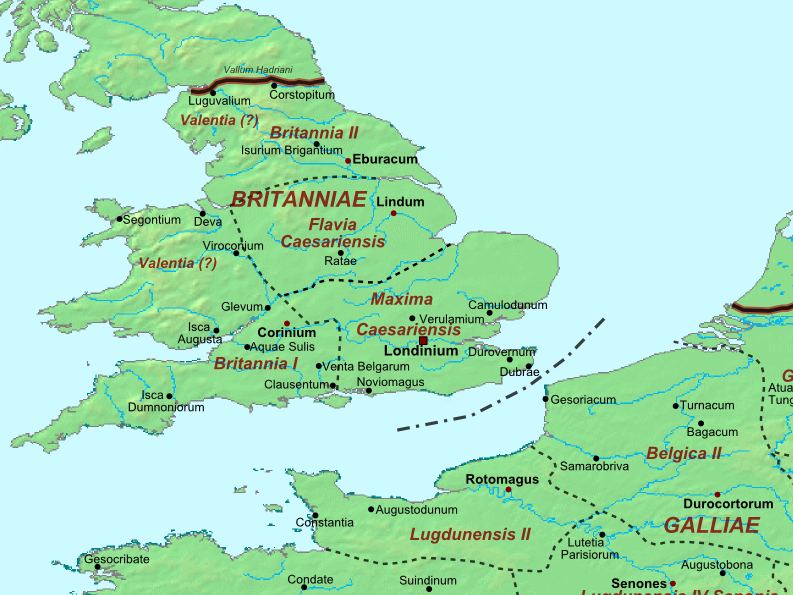
Another possible arrangement, with other possible placements of Valentia noted

In a reform carried out by 312, the Diocese of Britain was divided into four provinces, Maxima Caesariensis, Flavia Caesariensis, Britannia Prima and Britannia Secunda. The diocese was governed by a vicarius, and Britain was part of the Gallic region under the overall authority of a praetorian prefect, based at Trier.

The vicarius was based at Londinium as the principal city of the diocese. Londinium and Eboracum continued as provincial capitals and the territory was divided up into smaller provinces for administrative efficiency.

Civilian and military authority of a province was no longer exercised by one official, and the governor was stripped of military command, which was handed over to the Dux Britanniarum by 314. The governor of a province assumed more financial duties (the procurators of the Treasury ministry were slowly phased out in the first three decades of the 4th century). The Dux was commander of the troops of the Northern Region, primarily along Hadrian's Wall, and his responsibilities included protection of the frontier. He had significant autonomy due in part to the distance from his superiors.

The tasks of the vicarius were to control and coordinate the activities of governors; monitor but not interfere with the daily functioning of the Treasury and Crown Estates, which had their own administrative infrastructure; and act as the regional quartermaster-general of the armed forces. In short, as the sole civilian official with superior authority, he had general oversight of the administration, as well as direct control, while not absolute, over governors who were part of the prefecture; the other two fiscal departments were not.

The early-4th-century Verona List, the late-4th-century work of Sextus Rufus, and the early-5th-century List of Offices and work of Polemius Silvius all list four provinces by some variation of the names Britannia I, Britannia II, Maxima Caesariensis, and Flavia Caesariensis; all of these seem to have initially been directed by a governor (praeses) of equestrian rank. The 5th-century sources list a fifth province named Valentia and give its governor and Maxima's a consular rank. (Note: The Verona List actually includes a note that the Diocese of the Britains had six provinces, but then lists four. Sextus Rufus listed six provinces, including the highly dubious "province of Orcades" (Orkney Islands). Some scholars argue that the initial reforms established three provinces: Britannia I, Britannia II, and Britannia Caesariensis, which was subsequently divided into Flavia and Maxima.) Ammianus mentions Valentia as well, describing its creation by Theodosius the Elder in 369 after the quelling of the Great Conspiracy. Ammianus considered it a re-creation of a formerly lost province, leading some to think there had been an earlier fifth province under another name, sometimes conflated with "Vespasiana" a fictional province invented in Charles Bertram's 18th-century forgery De Situ Britanniae and leading others to place Valentia beyond Hadrian's Wall, in the territory abandoned south of the Antonine Wall.

Reconstructions of the provinces and provincial capitals during this period partially rely on ecclesiastical records. On the assumption that the early bishoprics mimicked the imperial hierarchy, scholars use the list of bishops for the 314 Council of Arles. The list is patently corrupt: the British delegation is given as including a Bishop "Eborius" of Eboracum and two bishops "from Londinium" (one de civitate Londinensi and the other de civitate colonia Londinensium). (Note: "Nomina Episcoporum, cum Clericis Suis, Quinam, et ex Quibus Provinciis, ad Arelatensem Synodum Convenerint" ["The Names of the Bishops with Their Clerics who Came Together at the Synod of Arles and from which Province They Came"] from the Consilia in Thackery (in Latin)) The error is variously emended: Bishop Ussher proposed Colonia, Selden Col. or Colon. Camalodun., and Spelman Colonia Cameloduni (all various names of Colchester); (Note: Although Ussher refers the reader to his earlier discussion of the 28 Cities of Britain, which notes that "Cair Colun" may refer to either Colchester in Essex or to a settlement in Merionethshire.) Gale and Bingham offered colonia Lindi and Henry Colonia Lindum (both Lincoln); and Bishop Stillingfleet and Francis Thackeray read it as a scribal error of Civ. Col. Londin. for an original Civ. Col. Leg. II (Caerleon). On the basis of the Verona List, the priest and deacon who accompanied the bishops in some manuscripts are ascribed to the fourth province.

In the 12th century, Gerald of Wales described the supposedly metropolitan sees of the early British church established by the legendary Saints Fagan and "Duvian". He placed Britannia Prima in Wales and western England with its capital at "Urbs Legionum" (Caerleon); Britannia Secunda in Kent and southern England with its capital at "Dorobernia" (Canterbury); Flavia in Mercia and central England with its capital at "Lundonia" (London); "Maximia" in northern England with its capital at Eboracum (York); and Valentia in "Albania which is now Scotland" with its capital at St Andrews. Modern scholars generally dispute the last: some place Valentia at or beyond Hadrian's Wall but St Andrews is beyond even the Antonine Wall and Gerald seems to have simply been supporting the antiquity of its church for political reasons.

A common modern reconstruction places the consular province of Maxima at Londinium, on the basis of its status as the seat of the diocesan vicarius; places Prima in the west according to Gerald's traditional account but moves its capital to Corinium of the Dobunni (Cirencester) on the basis of an artifact recovered there referring to Lucius Septimius, a provincial rector; places Flavia north of Maxima, with its capital placed at Lindum Colonia (Lincoln) to match one emendation of the bishops list from Arles; (Note: Bede also references a Provincia Lindisi or prouinciae Lindissi, which was a later Saxon territory at the time of the Gregorian mission.) and places Secunda in the north with its capital at Eboracum (York). Valentia is placed variously in northern Wales around Deva (Chester); beside Hadrian's Wall around Luguvalium (Carlisle); and between the walls along Dere Street.

=== Fourth-century history ===
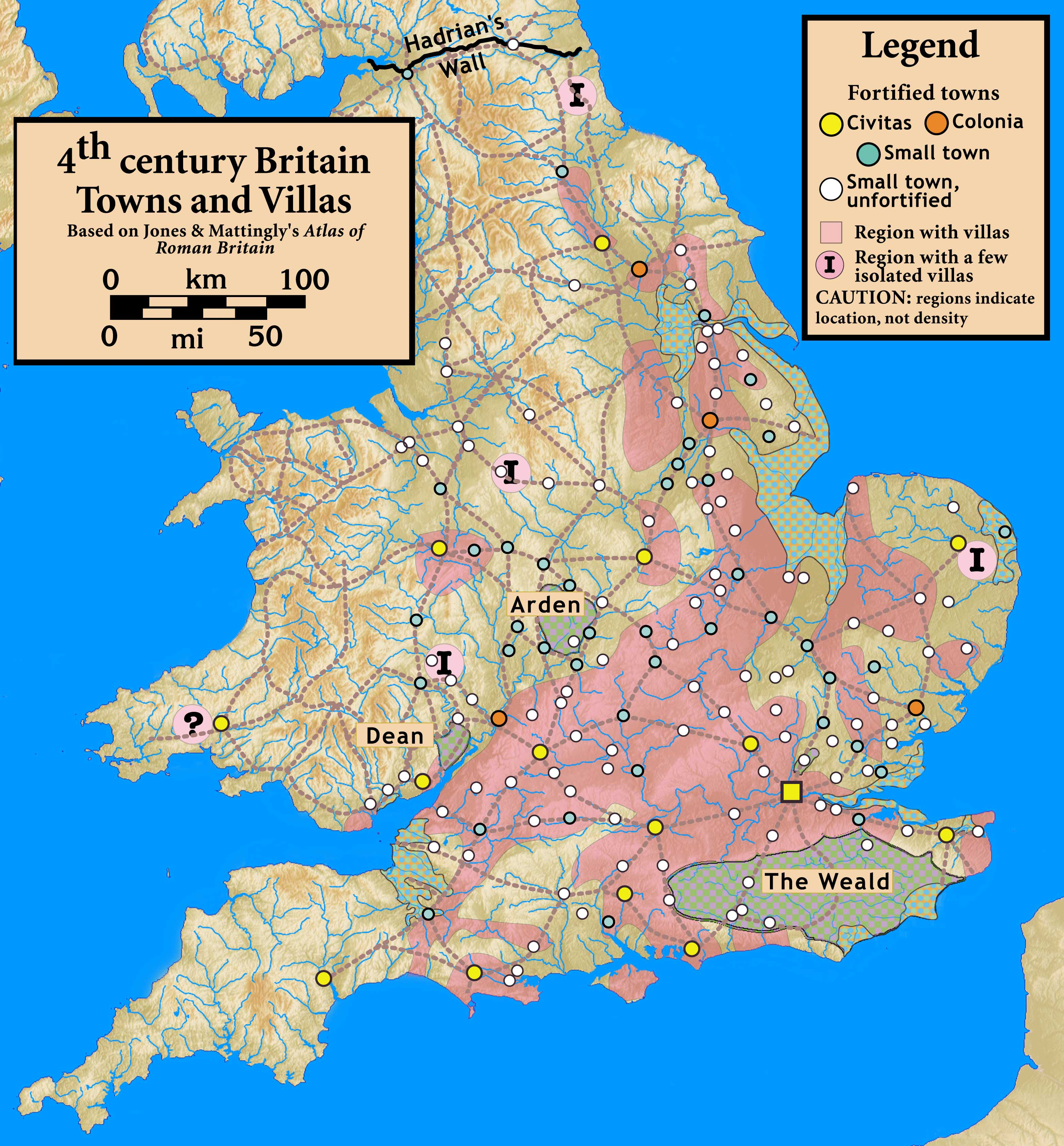
4th-century Roman towns and villas

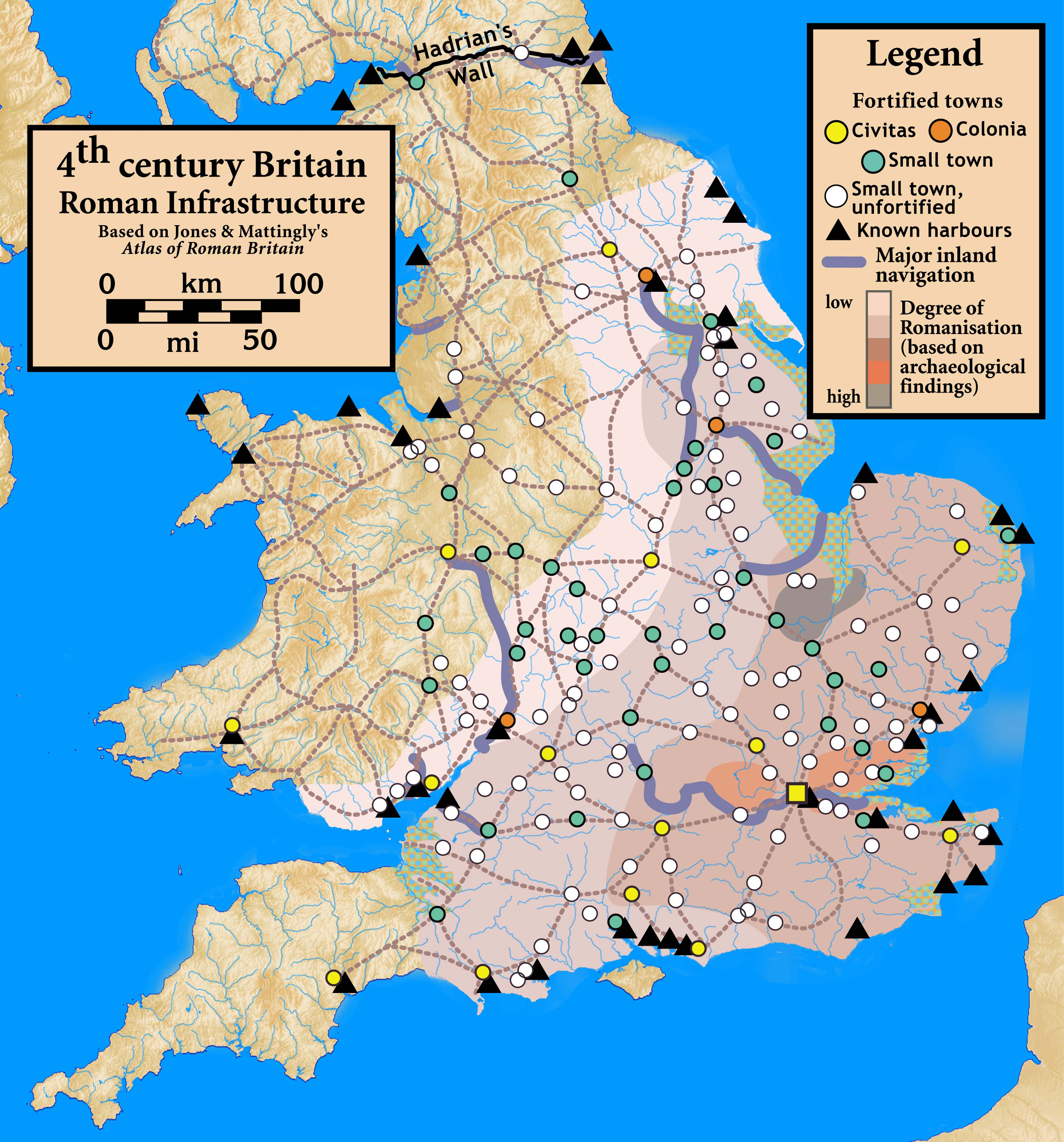
4th century: Degree of Romanisation

Emperor Constantius returned to Britain in 306, despite his poor health, with an army aiming to invade northern Britain, the provincial defences having been rebuilt in the preceding years. Little is known of his campaigns with scant archaeological evidence, but fragmentary historical sources suggest he reached the far north of Britain and won a major battle in early summer before returning south. His son Constantine (later Constantine the Great) spent a year in northern Britain at his father's side, campaigning against the Picts beyond Hadrian's Wall in the summer and autumn. Constantius died in York in July 306 with his son at his side. Constantine then successfully used Britain as the starting point of his march to the imperial throne, unlike the earlier usurper, Albinus.

In the middle of the century, the province was loyal for a few years to the usurper Magnentius, who succeeded Constans following the latter's death. After the defeat and death of Magnentius in the Battle of Mons Seleucus in 353, Constantius II dispatched his chief imperial notary Paulus Catena to Britain to hunt down Magnentius's supporters. The investigation deteriorated into a witch-hunt, which forced the vicarius Flavius Martinus to intervene. When Paulus retaliated by accusing Martinus of treason, the vicarius attacked Paulus with a sword, with the aim of assassinating him, but in the end he committed suicide.

As the 4th century progressed, there were increasing attacks from the Saxons in the east and the Scoti (Irish) in the west. A series of forts had been built, starting around 280, to defend the coasts, but these preparations were not enough when, in 367, a general assault of Saxons, Picts, Scoti and Attacotti, combined with apparent dissension in the garrison on Hadrian's Wall, left Roman Britain prostrate. The invaders overwhelmed the entire western and northern regions of Britannia and the cities were sacked. This crisis, sometimes called the Barbarian Conspiracy or the Great Conspiracy, was settled by Theodosius the Elder from 368 with a string of military and civil reforms. Theodosius crossed from Bononia (Boulogne-sur-Mer) and marched on Londinium where he began to deal with the invaders and made his base. An amnesty was promised to deserters which enabled Theodosius to regarrison abandoned forts. By the end of the year Hadrian's Wall was retaken and order returned. Considerable reorganization was undertaken in Britain, including the creation of a new province named Valentia, probably to better address the state of the far north. A new Dux Britanniarum was appointed, Dulcitius, with Civilis to head a new civilian administration.

Another imperial usurper, Magnus Maximus, raised the standard of revolt at Segontium (Caernarfon) in north Wales in 383, and crossed the English Channel. Maximus held much of the western empire, and fought a successful campaign against the Picts and Scots around 384. His continental exploits required troops from Britain, and it appears that forts at Chester and elsewhere were abandoned in this period, triggering raids and settlement in north Wales by the Irish. His rule was ended in 388, but not all the British troops may have returned: the Empire's military resources were stretched to the limit along the Rhine and Danube. Around 396 there were more barbarian incursions into Britain. Stilicho led a punitive expedition. It seems peace was restored by 399, and it is likely that no further garrisoning was ordered; by 401 more troops were withdrawn, to assist in the war against Alaric I.

=== End of Roman rule ===
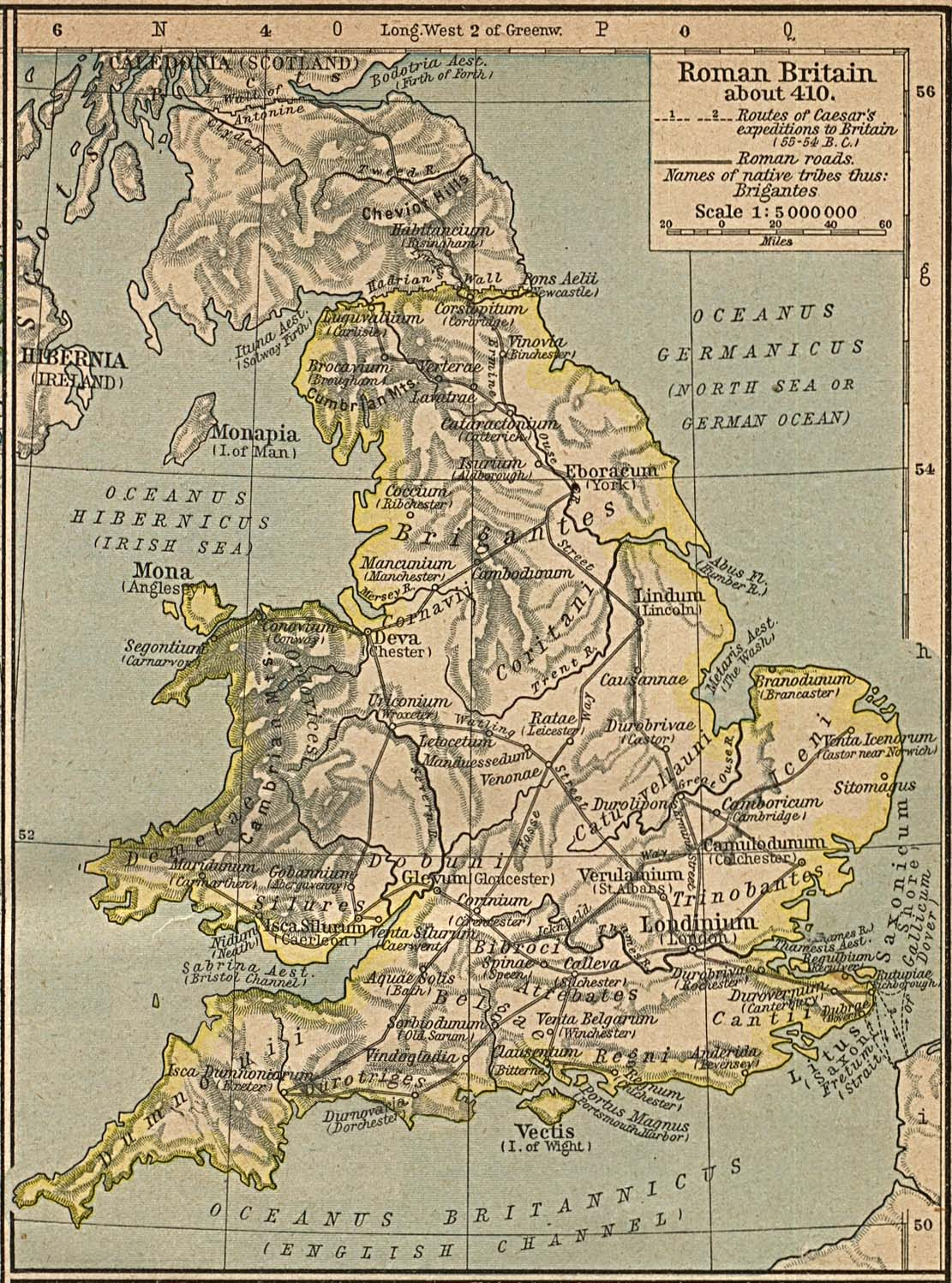
Roman Britain in 410 AD

The traditional view of historians, informed by the work of Michael Rostovtzeff, was of a widespread economic decline at the beginning of the 5th century. Consistent archaeological evidence has told another story, and the accepted view is undergoing re-evaluation. Some features are agreed: more opulent but fewer urban houses, an end to new public building and some abandonment of existing ones, with the exception of defensive structures, and the widespread formation of dark earth (deposits indicating increased horticulture within urban precincts). (Note: Archaeological evidence of late 4th-century urban collapse is analysed by A.S. Esmonde-Cleary; the "de-romanisation" of Britain is the subject of several accounts by Richard Reece, Simon Loseby makes a case for discontinuity of urban life.)

The abandonment of some sites is now believed to be later than had been thought. Many buildings changed use but were not destroyed. There was a growing number of barbarian attacks, but these targeted vulnerable rural settlements rather than towns. Some villas such as Chedworth, Great Casterton in Rutland and Hucclecote in Gloucestershire had new mosaic floors laid around this time, suggesting that economic problems may have been limited and patchy. Many suffered some decay before being abandoned in the 5th century; the story of Saint Patrick indicates that villas were still occupied until at least 430. Exceptionally, new buildings were still going up in this period in Verulamium and Cirencester. Some urban centres, for example Canterbury, Cirencester, Wroxeter, Winchester and Gloucester, remained active during the 5th and 6th centuries, surrounded by large farming estates.

Urban life had generally grown less intense by the fourth quarter of the 4th century, and coins minted between 378 and 388 are very rare, indicating a likely combination of economic decline, diminishing numbers of troops, problems with the payment of soldiers and officials or with unstable conditions during the usurpation of Magnus Maximus 383–87. Coinage circulation increased during the 390s, but never attained the levels of earlier decades. Copper coins are very rare after 402, though minted silver and gold coins from hoards indicate they were still present in the province even if they were not being spent. By 407 there were very few new Roman coins going into circulation, and by 430 it is likely that coinage as a medium of exchange had been abandoned. Mass-produced wheel thrown pottery ended at approximately the same time; the rich continued to use metal and glass vessels, while the poor made do with humble "grey ware" or resorted to leather or wooden containers.

=== Sub-Roman Britain ===
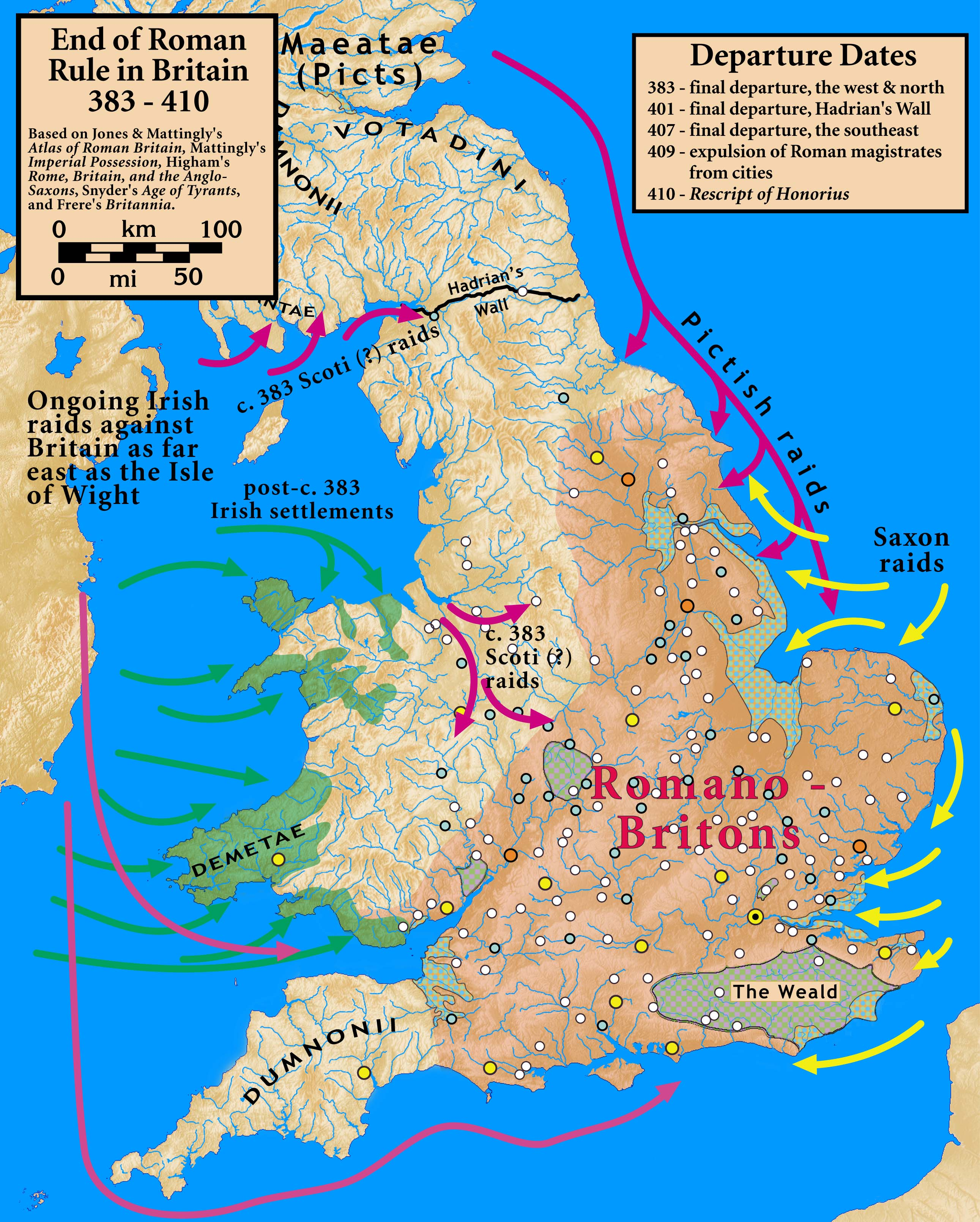
End of Roman rule in Britain, 383–410 AD

Towards the end of the 4th century Roman rule in Britain came under increasing pressure from barbarian attacks. Apparently, there were not enough troops to mount an effective defence. After elevating two disappointing usurpers, the army chose a soldier, Constantine III, to become emperor in 407. He crossed to Gaul but was defeated by Honorius; it is unclear how many troops remained or ever returned, or whether a commander-in-chief in Britain was ever reappointed. A Saxon incursion in 408 was apparently repelled by the Britons, and in 409 Zosimus records that the natives expelled the Roman civilian administration. Zosimus may be referring to the Bagaudae rebellion of the Breton inhabitants of Armorica since he describes how, in the aftermath of the revolt, all of Armorica and the rest of Gaul followed the example of the Brettaniai. A letter from Emperor Honorius in 410 has traditionally been seen as rejecting a British appeal for help, but it may have been addressed to Bruttium or Bologna. With the imperial layers of the military and civil government gone, administration and justice fell to municipal authorities, and local warlords gradually emerged all over Britain, still utilizing Romano-British ideals and conventions. Historian Stuart Laycock has investigated this process and emphasised elements of continuity from the British tribes in the pre-Roman and Roman periods, through to the native post-Roman kingdoms.

In British tradition, pagan Saxons were invited by Vortigern to assist in fighting the Picts, Scoti, and Déisi. (Germanic migration into Roman Britannia may have begun much earlier. There is recorded evidence, for example, of Germanic auxiliaries supporting the legions in Britain in the 1st and 2nd centuries.) The new arrivals rebelled, plunging the country into a series of wars that eventually led to the Saxon occupation of Lowland Britain by 600. Around this time, many Britons fled to Brittany (hence its name), Galicia and probably Ireland. A significant date in sub-Roman Britain is the Groans of the Britons, an unanswered appeal to Aetius, leading general of the western Empire, for assistance against Saxon invasion in 446. Another is the Battle of Deorham in 577, after which the significant cities of Bath, Cirencester and Gloucester fell and the Saxons reached the western sea.

Historians generally reject the historicity of King Arthur, who is supposed to have resisted the Anglo-Saxon conquest according to later medieval legends.

== Trade ==
During the Roman period Britain's continental trade was principally directed across the Southern North Sea and Eastern Channel, focusing on the narrow Strait of Dover, with more limited links via the Atlantic seaways. The most important British ports were London and Richborough, whilst the continental ports most heavily engaged in trade with Britain were Boulogne and the sites of Domburg and Colijnsplaat at the mouth of the river Scheldt. During the Late Roman period it is likely that the shore forts played some role in continental trade alongside their defensive functions.

Exports to Britain included: coin; pottery, particularly red-gloss terra sigillata (samian ware) from southern, central and eastern Gaul, as well as various other wares from Gaul and the Rhine provinces; olive oil from southern Spain in amphorae; wine from Gaul in amphorae and barrels; salted fish products from the western Mediterranean and Brittany in barrels and amphorae; preserved olives from southern Spain in amphorae; lava quern-stones from Mayen on the middle Rhine; glass; and some agricultural products. Britain's exports are harder to detect archaeologically, but will have included metals, such as silver and gold and some lead, iron and copper. Other exports probably included agricultural products, oysters and salt, whilst large quantities of coin would have been re-exported back to the continent as well.

These products moved as a result of private trade and also through payments and contracts established by the Roman state to support its military forces and officials on the island, as well as through state taxation and extraction of resources. Up until the mid-3rd century AD, the Roman state's payments appear to have been unbalanced, with far more products sent to Britain, to support its large military force (which had reached c. 53,000 by the mid-2nd century), than were extracted from the island.

It has been argued that Roman Britain's continental trade peaked in the late 1st century AD and thereafter declined as a result of an increasing reliance on local products by the population of Britain, caused by economic development on the island and by the Roman state's desire to save money by shifting away from expensive long-distance imports. Evidence has been outlined that suggests that the principal decline in Roman Britain's continental trade may have occurred in the late 2nd century AD, from c. 165 AD onwards. This has been linked to the economic impact of contemporary empire-wide crises: the Antonine Plague and the Marcomannic Wars.

From the mid-3rd century AD onwards, Britain no longer received such a wide range and extensive quantity of foreign imports as it did during the earlier part of the Roman period; vast quantities of coin from continental mints reached the island, whilst there is historical evidence for the export of large amounts of British grain to the continent during the mid-4th century. During the latter part of the Roman period British agricultural products, paid for by both the Roman state and by private consumers, clearly played an important role in supporting the military garrisons and urban centres of the northwestern continental Empire. This came about as a result of the rapid decline in the size of the British garrison from the mid-3rd century onwards (thus freeing up more goods for export), and because of 'Germanic' incursions across the Rhine, which appear to have reduced rural settlement and agricultural output in northern Gaul.

== Economy ==
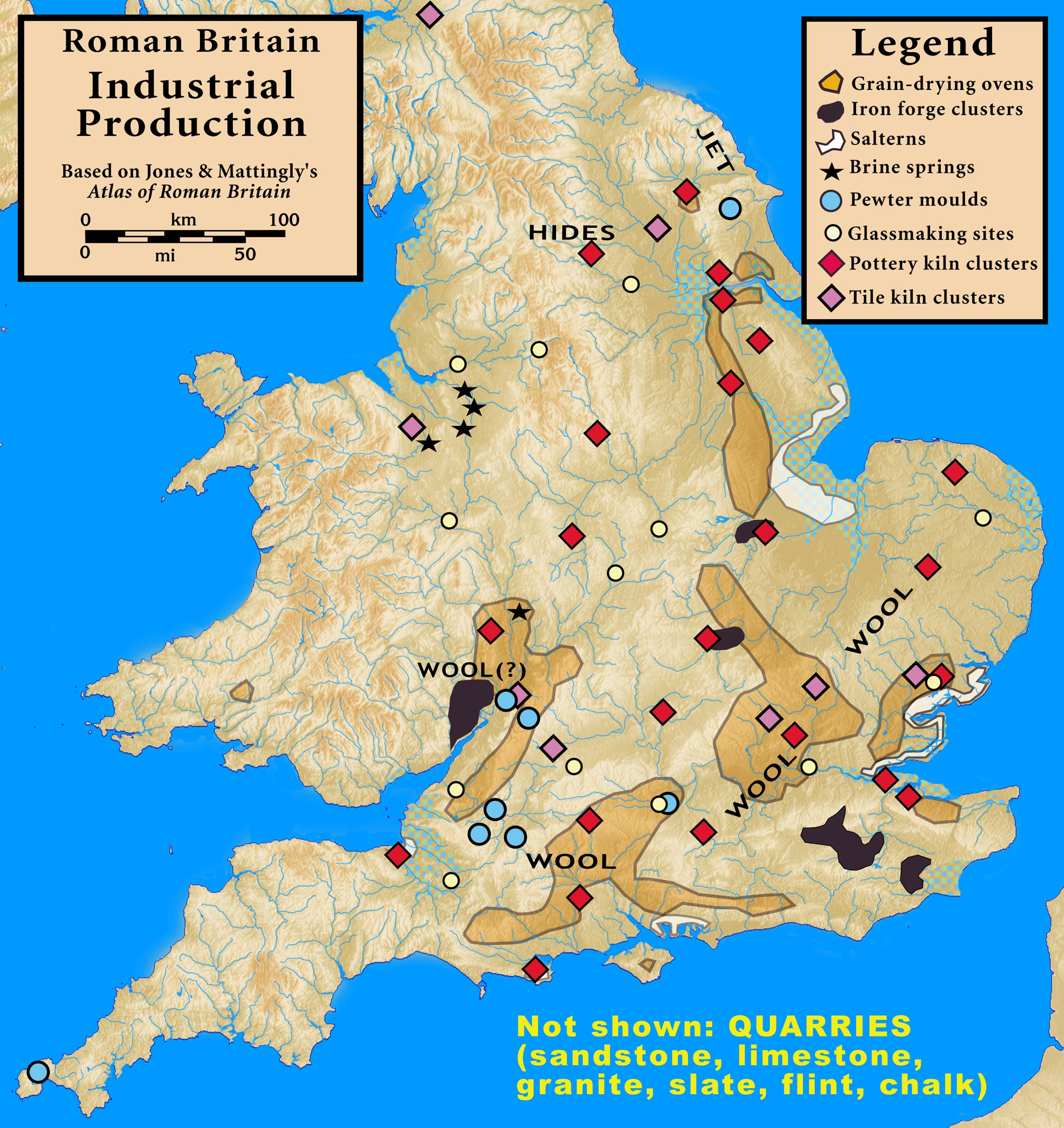
Industrial production in Roman Britain

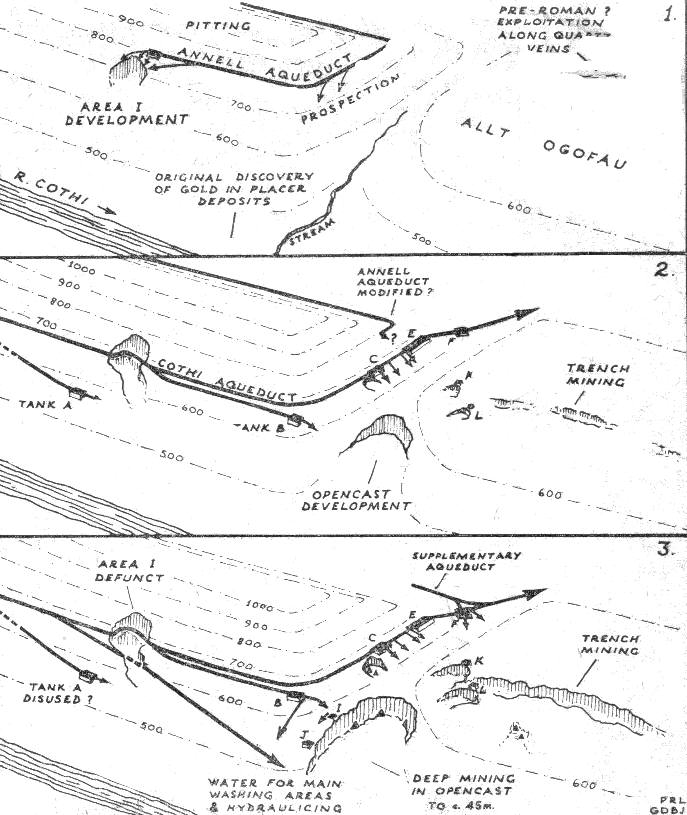
Development of Dolaucothi Gold Mines in Wales

Mineral extraction sites such as the Dolaucothi gold mine were probably first worked by the Roman army from c. 75 AD, and at some later stage passed to civilian operators. The mine developed as a series of opencast workings, mainly by the use of hydraulic mining methods. They are described by Pliny the Elder in his Natural History in great detail. Essentially, water supplied by aqueducts was used to prospect for ore veins by stripping away soil to reveal the bedrock. If veins were present, they were attacked using fire-setting and the ore removed for comminution. The dust was washed in a small stream of water and the heavy gold dust and gold nuggets collected in riffles. The diagram at right shows how Dolaucothi developed from c. 75 through to the 1st century. When opencast work was no longer feasible, tunnels were driven to follow the veins. The evidence from the site shows advanced technology probably under the control of army engineers.

The Wealden ironworking zone, the lead and silver mines of the Mendip Hills and the tin mines of Cornwall seem to have been private enterprises leased from the government for a fee. Mining had long been practised in Britain (see Grimes Graves), but the Romans introduced new technical knowledge and large-scale industrial production to revolutionise the industry. It included hydraulic mining to prospect for ore by removing overburden as well as work alluvial deposits. The water needed for such large-scale operations was supplied by one or more aqueducts, those surviving at Dolaucothi being especially impressive. Many prospecting areas were in dangerous, upland country, and, although mineral exploitation was presumably one of the main reasons for the Roman invasion, it had to wait until these areas were subdued.

By the 3rd and 4th centuries, small towns could often be found near villas. In these towns, villa owners and small-scale farmers could obtain specialist tools. Lowland Britain in the 4th century was agriculturally prosperous enough to export grain to the continent. This prosperity lay behind the blossoming of villa building and decoration that occurred between 300 and 350.

Britain's cities also consumed Roman-style pottery and other goods, and were centres through which goods could be distributed elsewhere. During the first two centuries of Roman rule, Britain is said to have been hugely reliant on imported pottery, but by the fourth century, it was self-sufficient. This has been cited as an example of economic development, and at least one town, Durobrivae, primarily manufactured pottery. At Wroxeter in Shropshire, stock smashed into a gutter during a 2nd-century fire reveals that Gaulish samian ware was being sold alongside mixing bowls from the Mancetter-Hartshill industry of the West Midlands. Roman designs were most popular, but rural craftsmen still produced items derived from the Iron Age La Tène artistic traditions. Britain was home to much gold, which attracted Roman invaders. By the 3rd century, Britain's economy was diverse and well established, with commerce extending into the non-Romanised north.

== Government ==
Under the Roman Empire, administration of peaceful provinces was ultimately the remit of the Senate, but those, like Britain, that required permanent garrisons, were placed under the Emperor's control. In practice imperial provinces were run by resident governors who were members of the Senate and had held the consulship. These men were carefully selected, often having strong records of military success and administrative ability. In Britain, a governor's role was primarily military, but numerous other tasks were also his responsibility, such as maintaining diplomatic relations with local client kings, building roads, ensuring the public courier system functioned, supervising the civitates and acting as a judge in important legal cases. When not campaigning, he would travel the province hearing complaints and recruiting new troops.

To assist him in legal matters he had an adviser, the legatus juridicus, and those in Britain appear to have been distinguished lawyers perhaps because of the challenge of incorporating tribes into the imperial system and devising a workable method of taxing them. Financial administration was dealt with by a procurator with junior posts for each tax-raising power. Each legion in Britain had a commander who answered to the governor and, in time of war, probably directly ruled troublesome districts. Each of these commands carried a tour of duty of two to three years in different provinces. Below these posts was a network of administrative managers covering intelligence gathering, sending reports to Rome, organising military supplies and dealing with prisoners. A staff of seconded soldiers provided clerical services.

Colchester was probably the earliest capital of Roman Britain, but it was soon eclipsed by London with its strong mercantile connections. The different forms of municipal organisation in Britannia were known as civitas (which were subdivided, amongst other forms, into colonies such as York, Colchester, Gloucester and Lincoln and municipalities such as Verulamium), and were each governed by a senate of local landowners, whether Brythonic or Roman, who elected magistrates concerning judicial and civic affairs. The various civitates sent representatives to a yearly provincial council in order to profess loyalty to the Roman state, to send direct petitions to the Emperor in times of extraordinary need, and to worship the imperial cult.

== Demographics ==
Roman Britain had an estimated population between 2.8 million and 3 million people at the end of the second century. At the end of the fourth century, it had an estimated population of 3.6 million people, of whom 125,000 consisted of the Roman army and their families and dependents. The urban population of Roman Britain was about 240,000 people at the end of the fourth century. The capital city of Londinium is estimated to have had a population of about 60,000 people.

Londinium was an ethnically diverse city with inhabitants from the Roman Empire, including natives of Britannia, continental Europe, the Middle East, and North Africa. There was also cultural diversity in other Roman-British towns, which were sustained by considerable migration, from Britannia and other Roman territories, including continental Europe, Roman Syria, the Eastern Mediterranean and North Africa. In a 2012 study, around 45 percent of sites investigated dating from the Roman period had at least one individual of North African origin.

=== Town and country ===
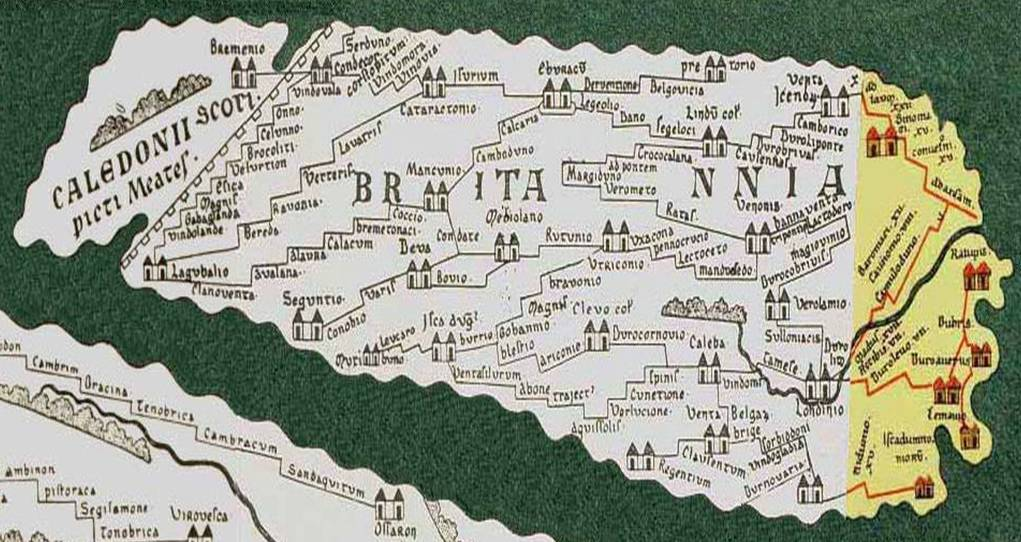
Britannia as shown on the Tabula Peutingeriana. Modern copy from 1897

During their occupation of Britain, the Romans founded a number of important settlements, many of which survive. The towns suffered attrition in the later 4th century, when public building ceased and some were abandoned to private use. Place names survived the deurbanised Sub-Roman and early Anglo-Saxon periods, and historiography has been at pains to signal the expected survivals, but archaeology shows that a bare handful of Roman towns were continuously occupied. According to S.T. Loseby, the very idea of a town as a centre of power and administration was reintroduced to England by the Roman Christianising mission to Canterbury, and its urban revival was delayed to the 10th century.

Roman towns can be broadly grouped in two categories. Civitates, "public towns" were formally laid out on a grid plan, and their role in imperial administration occasioned the construction of public buildings. The much more numerous category of vici, "small towns" grew on informal plans, often round a camp or at a ford or crossroads; some were not small, others were scarcely urban, some not even defended by a wall, the characteristic feature of a place of any importance.

Cities and towns which have Roman origins, or were extensively developed by them are listed with their Latin names in brackets; civitates are marked C.

- Alcester (Alauna)
- Alchester
- Aldborough, North Yorkshire (Isurium Brigantum) C
- Bath (Aquae Sulis) C
- Brough (Petuaria) C
- Buxton (Aquae Arnemetiae)
- Caerleon (Isca Augusta) C
- Caernarfon (Segontium) C
- Caerwent (Venta Silurum) C
- Caister-on-Sea C
- Canterbury (Durovernum Cantiacorum) C
- Carlisle (Luguvalium) C
- Carmarthen (Moridunum) C
- Chelmsford (Caesaromagus)
- Chester (Deva Victrix) C
- Chester-le-Street (Concangis)
- Chichester (Noviomagus Reginorum) (Note: Noviomagus Reginorum: meaning "new field" or "new clearing" of the Regni) C
- Cirencester (Corinium) C
- Colchester (Camulodunum) C
- Corbridge (Coria) C
- Dorchester (Durnovaria) C
- Dover (Portus Dubris)
- Exeter (Isca Dumnoniorum) C
- Gloucester (Glevum) C
- Great Chesterford, north Essex (the name of this vicus is unknown)
- Ilchester (Lindinis) C
- Leicester (Ratae Corieltauvorum) C
- Lincoln (Lindum Colonia) C
- London (Londinium) C
- Manchester (Mamucium) C
- Newcastle upon Tyne (Pons Aelius)
- Northwich (Condate)
- St Albans (Verulamium) C
- Silchester (Calleva Atrebatum) C
- Towcester (Lactodurum)
- Whitchurch (Mediolanum) C
- Winchester (Venta Belgarum) C
- Wroxeter (Viroconium Cornoviorum) C
- York (Eboracum) C

== Religion ==
=== Pagan ===
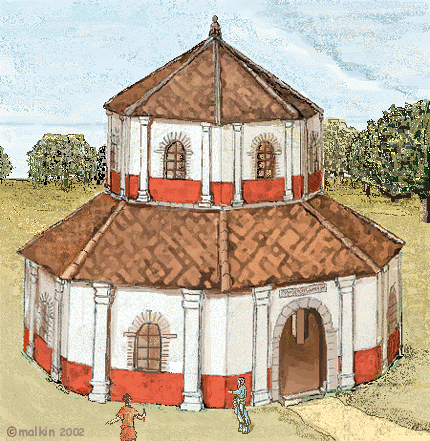
An artist's reconstruction of Pagans Hill Roman Temple, Somerset

The druids, the Celtic priestly caste who were believed to originate in Britain, were outlawed by Claudius, and in 61 AD they vainly defended their sacred groves from destruction by the Romans on the island of Mona (Anglesey). Under Roman rule the Britons continued to worship native Celtic deities, such as Ancasta, but often conflated with their Roman equivalents, like Mars Rigonemetos at Nettleham.

The degree to which earlier native beliefs survived is difficult to gauge precisely. Certain European ritual traits such as the significance of the number 3, the importance of the head and of water sources such as springs remain in the archaeological record, but the differences in the votive offerings made at the baths at Bath, Somerset, before and after the Roman conquest suggest that continuity was only partial. Worship of the Roman emperor is widely recorded, especially at military sites. The founding of a Roman temple to Claudius at Camulodunum was one of the impositions that led to the revolt of Boudica. By the 3rd century, Pagans Hill Roman Temple in Somerset was able to exist peaceably and it did so into the 5th century.

Pagan religious practices were supported by priests, represented in Britain by votive deposits of priestly regalia such as chain crowns from West Stow and Willingham Fen.

Eastern cults such as Mithraism grew in popularity towards the end of the occupation. The London Mithraeum is one example of the popularity of mystery religions among the soldiery. Temples to Mithras also exist in military contexts at Vindobala on Hadrian's Wall (the Rudchester Mithraeum) and at Segontium in Roman Wales (the Caernarfon Mithraeum).

=== Christianity ===
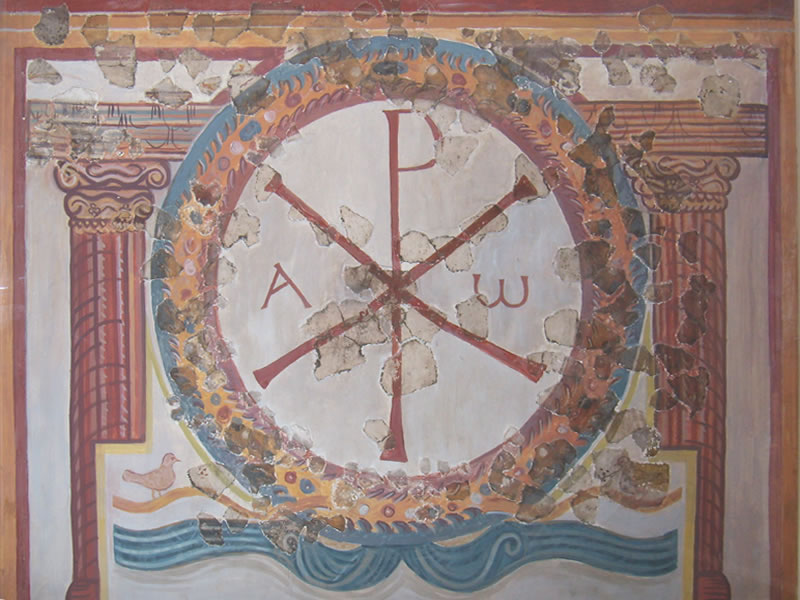
The fourth-century Chi-Rho fresco from Lullingstone Roman Villa, Kent, contains the only known Christian paintings from the Roman era in Britain.

It is not clear when or how Christianity came to Britain. A 2nd-century "word square" has been discovered in Mamucium, the Roman settlement of Manchester. It consists of an anagram of PATER NOSTER carved on a piece of amphora. There has been discussion by academics whether the "word square" is a Christian artefact, but if it is, it is one of the earliest examples of early Christianity in Britain. The earliest confirmed written evidence for Christianity in Britain is a statement by Tertullian, c. 200 AD, in which he described "all the limits of the Spains, and the diverse nations of the Gauls, and the haunts of the Britons, inaccessible to the Romans, but subjugated to Christ".

Archaeological evidence for Christian communities begins to appear in the 3rd and 4th centuries. Small timber churches are suggested at Lincoln and Silchester and baptismal fonts have been found at Icklingham and the Saxon Shore Fort at Richborough. The Icklingham font is made of lead, and visible in the British Museum. A Roman Christian graveyard exists at the same site in Icklingham. A possible Roman 4th-century church and associated burial ground was also discovered at Butt Road on the south-west outskirts of Colchester during the construction of the new police station there, overlying an earlier pagan cemetery.

The Water Newton Treasure is a hoard of Christian silver church plate from the early 4th century and the Roman villas at Lullingstone and Hinton St Mary contained Christian wall paintings and mosaics respectively. A large 4th-century cemetery at Poundbury with its east–west oriented burials and lack of grave goods has been interpreted as an early Christian burial ground, although such burial rites were also becoming increasingly common in pagan contexts during the period.

The Church in Britain seems to have developed the customary diocesan system, as evidenced from the records of the Council of Arles in Gaul in 314: represented at the council were bishops from thirty-five sees from Europe and North Africa, including three bishops from Britain, Eborius of York, Restitutus of London, and Adelphius, possibly a bishop of Lincoln. No other early sees are documented, and the material remains of early church structures are far to seek.

The existence of a church in the forum courtyard of Lincoln and the martyrium of Saint Alban on the outskirts of Roman Verulamium are exceptional. Alban, the first British Christian martyr and by far the most prominent, is believed to have died in the early 4th century (some date him in the middle 3rd century), followed by Saints Julius and Aaron of Isca Augusta. Christianity was legalised in the Roman Empire by Constantine I in 313. Theodosius I made Christianity the state religion of the empire in 391, and by the 5th century it was well established. One belief labelled a heresy by the church authorities – Pelagianism – was originated by a British monk teaching in Rome: Pelagius lived c. 354 to c. 420/440.

A letter found on a lead tablet in Bath, Somerset, datable to c. 363, had been widely publicised as documentary evidence regarding the state of Christianity in Britain during Roman times. According to its first translator, it was written in Wroxeter by a Christian man called Vinisius to a Christian woman called Nigra, and was claimed as the first epigraphic record of Christianity in Britain. This translation of the letter was apparently based on grave paleographical errors, and the text has nothing to do with Christianity, and in fact relates to pagan rituals.

== Environmental changes ==
The Romans introduced a number of species to Britain, including possibly the now-rare Roman nettle (Urtica pilulifera), said to have been used by soldiers to warm their arms and legs, and the edible snail Helix pomatia. There is some evidence they may have introduced rabbits, of the smaller southern Mediterranean type. The European rabbit (Oryctolagus cuniculus) prevalent in modern Britain is assumed to have been introduced from the continent after the Norman invasion of 1066. Box (Buxus sempervirens) is rarely recorded before the Roman period, but becomes a common find in towns and villas.

== Legacy ==
Roman roads around 150 AD

During their occupation of Britain the Romans built an extensive network of roads which continued to be used in later centuries and many are still followed today. The Romans also built water supply, sanitation and wastewater systems. Many of Britain's major cities, such as London (Londinium), Manchester (Mamucium) and York (Eboracum), were founded by the Romans, but the original Roman settlements were abandoned not long after the Romans left.

Unlike many other areas of the Western Roman Empire, the current majority language is not a Romance language, or a language descended from the pre-Roman inhabitants. The British language at the time of the invasion was Common Brittonic, and remained so after the Romans withdrew. It later split into regional languages, notably Cumbric, Cornish, Breton and Welsh. Examination of these languages suggests some 800 Latin words were incorporated into Common Brittonic (see Brittonic languages). The current majority language, English, is based on the languages of the Germanic tribes who migrated to the island from continental Europe from the 5th century onwards.

== See also ==
- History of the British Isles
- Wales in the Roman era
- Scotland during the Roman Empire
- Roman sites in Great Britain
- Roman roads in Britain

== Sources ==
- Alcock, Joan P. (2011). A Brief History of Roman Britain Conquest and Civilization. Hachette. ISBN 978-1-8452-9728-2.
- Birley, Anthony (1980). The People of Roman Britain. University of California Press.
- Birley, Anthony R. (2005). The Roman Government of Britain. Oxford University Press.
- Branigan, Keith (1985). Peoples of Roman Britain: The Catuvellauni. Sutton Publishing. ISBN 978-0-8629-9255-2.
- Burnham, Barry C.; Wacher, J. S. (1990). The 'Small Towns' of Roman Britain. Batsford. ISBN 978-0-7134-6175-6.
- Collins, Rob (2012). Hadrian's Wall and the End of Empire. Routledge. ISBN 9780415884112.
- Creighton, John (2000). Coins and power in Late Iron Age Britain. Cambridge University Press. ISBN 978-1-1394-3172-9.
- Cunliffe, Barry (2002). Facing the Ocean: the Atlantic and its Peoples 8000 BC – 1500 AD. Oxford University Press. ISBN 978-0-1928-5354-7.
- Esmonde-Cleary, A. S. (1989). The Ending of Roman Britain. London: Batsford. ISBN 978-0-4152-3898-4.
- Fulford, Michael (1977). "Pottery and Britain's Foreign Trade in the Later Roman Period". In Peacock, D. P. S. (ed.). Pottery and Early Commerce. Characterization and Trade in Roman and Later Ceramics. London: Academic Press. ISBN 978-0-1254-7850-2.
- Fulford, Michael (1978). "The interpretation of Britain's late Roman trade: the scope of medieval historical and archaeological analogy". In du Plat Taylor, Joan; Cleere, Henry (eds.). Roman Shipping and Trade: Britain and the Rhine Provinces. London: Council for British Archaeology. pp. 59–69. ISBN 978-0-9003-1262-5.
- Fulford, Michael (1984). "Demonstrating Britannia's Economic Dependence in the First and Second Centuries". In Blagg, T. F. C.; King, Anthony (eds.). Military and Civilian in Roman Britain: Cultural Relationships in a Frontier Province. Oxford: British Archaeological Reports. pp. 129–142. ISBN 978-0-8605-4296-4.
- Fulford, Michael (1989). "The Economy of Roman Britain". In Todd, Malcolm (ed.). Research on Roman Britain 1960–89. London: Society for the Promotion of Roman Studies. ISBN 978-0-9077-6413-7.
- Fulford, Michael (1991). "Britain and the Roman Empire: The Evidence for Regional and Long Distance Trade". In Jones, R. F. J. (ed.). Roman Britain: Recent Trends. Sheffield: J. R. Collis. ISBN 978-0-9060-9039-8.
- Fulford, Michael (1996). "Economic hotspots and provincial backwaters: modelling the late Roman economy". In King, Cathy E.; Wigg, David G. (eds.). Coin Finds and Coin Use in the Roman World. Studien zu Fundmünzen der Antike. Berlin: Mann Verlag. pp. 153–177. ISBN 978-3-7861-1628-8.
- Fulford, Michael (2004). "Economic Structures". In Todd, Malcolm (ed.). A Companion to Roman Britain. Oxford: Blackwell. ISBN 978-0-6312-1823-4.
- Fulford, Michael (2007). "Coasting Britannia: Roman Trade and Traffic Around the Shores of Britain". In Gosden, Chris; Hamerow, Helena; de Jersey, Philip; Lock, Gary (eds.). Communities and Connections: Essays in Honour of Barry Cunliffe. Oxford University Press. ISBN 978-0-1992-3034-1.
- Laycock, Stuart (2008). Britannia: the Failed State. The History Press. ISBN 978-0-7524-4614-1.
- Loseby, Simon T. (2000). "Power and Towns in Late Roman Britain and Early Anglo-Saxon England". In Ripoll, Gisela; Gurt, Josep M. (eds.). Sedes regiae (ann. 400–800). Series maior (in English, Spanish, and Latin). OCLC 45624503.
- Manley, John (2002). AD 43: The Roman Invasion of Britain: A Reassessment. The History Press. ISBN 978-0-7524-1959-6.
- Mattingly, David (2006). An Imperial Possession: Britain in the Roman Empire. London: Penguin. ISBN 978-0-1401-4822-0.
- Millet, Martin (1992). The Romanization of Britain: an essay in archaeological interpretation (2nd ed.). Cambridge University Press. ISBN 978-0-5214-2864-4.
- Monfort, César Carreras; Funari, P. P. A. (1998). Britannia y el Mediterráneo: Estudios Sobre el Abastecimiento de Aceite Bético y africano en Britannia [Britain and the Mediterranean: Studies on the Betic and African oil supply in Britannia] (in Spanish). Barcelona: Publicacions Universitat de Barcelona. ISBN 978-8-4475-1950-7.
- Moorhead, Sam; Stuttard, David (2012). The Romans who Shaped Britain. London: Thames & Hudson. ISBN 978-0-5002-5189-8.
- Morris, Francis (2010). North Sea and Channel Connectivity during the Late Iron Age and Roman Period (175/150 BC – 409 AD). British Archaeological Reports International Series. Oxford: Archaeopress.
- Peacock, D. P. S.; Williams, D. F. (1986). Amphorae in the Roman Economy. London: Longman. ISBN 978-0-5820-6555-0.
- Pearson, Andrew (2002). The Roman Shore Forts: Coastal Defences of Southern Britain. The History Press. ISBN 978-0-7524-1949-7.
- Reece, Richard (1980). "Town and country: the end of Roman Britain". World Archaeology. 12: 77–92. doi:10.1080/00438243.1980.9979782.
- Reece, Richard (1992). "The end of the city in Roman Britain". In Rich, J. (ed.). The City in Antiquity. pp. 136–144.
- Southern, Patricia (2012). Roman Britain: A New History 55 BC – 450 AD. Stroud: Amberley Publishing. ISBN 978-1-4456-0146-5.
- Todd, Malcolm (2004). "Julius Agricola, Gnaeus [known as Agricola] (ad 40–93)". Oxford Dictionary of National Biography. Oxford University Press. doi:10.1093/ref:odnb/48290. (subscription, Wikipedia Library access or UK public library membership required)
- Tyers, Paul (1996a). Roman Pottery in Britain. London: Batsford. ISBN 978-0-7134-7412-1.
- Tyers, Paul (1996b). "Roman amphoras in Britain". Internet Archaeology. 1. Council for British Archaeology. doi:10.11141/ia.1.6.
- Wacher, John (1995). The Towns of Roman Britain (2nd revised ed.). Routledge. ISBN 978-0-7134-7319-3.
- Webster, Graham (1998). The Roman Imperial Army of the first and second centuries AD (3rd ed.). University of Oklahoma Press. ISBN 978-0-8061-3000-2.
- Welsh, George (1963). Britannia: the Roman Conquest and Occupation of Britain.
