= Argumentation and Debate =

Educational book series about debating

- Author: Various
- Language: English
- Publisher: The Macmillan Company
- Published: 1904-1969

Argumentation and Debate was a long-running series of educational books about debating published by Macmillan from 1904 to 1969. The earliest editions were written by Craven Laycock and Robert Leighton Scales, both affiliated with Dartmouth College. They dedicated the book to colleague Charles Francis Richardson. In 1917, authorship passed to James Milton O'Neill of the University of Wisconsin who rewrote the book, feeling that while "the original text contained the clearest and most orderly explanation of the subject ever published", it "was not sufficiently thorough for college and university classes." O'Neill added discussions of related topics from logic, law, and rhetoric while retaining the preface, dedication, organization, and some language from the original editions written by Laycock and Scales.

The book passed into the hands of Northwestern University professors James H. McBurney and Glen E. Mills in 1951 with a "second edition" published in 1964. These later editions were published with the subtitle "Techniques of a Free Society" and borrowed material from the 1932 book The Working Principles of Argument by O'Neill and McBurney. Sections of the 1951 book were written separately by O'Neill, McBurney, and Mills, although O'Neill's contributions were dropped in the 1964 edition.
