= Leacock =

Leacock may refer to:

== Places ==
- Leacock Regional Park in Casula, south-west of Sydney, Australia
- Leacock Township, Lancaster County, Pennsylvania, USA
- Upper Leacock Township, Pennsylvania, USA

== Surname ==
- Christopher Leacock (born 1978), Trinidadian DJ and music producer better known as Jillionaire
- Dean Leacock (born 1984), English professional footballer
- Edward Leacock (1853–1927), English-born real estate speculator and political figure in Manitoba
- Eleanor Leacock (1922–1987), anthropologist and social theorist
- Ernie Leacock (1906–1977), professional ice hockey defender
- Hamble James Leacock (1795–1856), African missionary
- Isaiah Leacock (born 1999), Trinidadian footballer
- Matt Leacock, Board game designer
- Philip Leacock (1917–1990), English television and film director and producer
- Richard Leacock (1921–2011), British-born documentary film director, pioneer of Direct Cinema and Cinéma vérité
- Robin Melanie Leacock, documentary filmmaker, directed It Girls, A Passion For Giving & I'll Take Manhattan
- St Clair Leacock, member of parliament in Saint Vincent and the Grenadines
- Stephen Leacock, FRSC (1869–1944), Canadian teacher, political scientist, writer, and humorist
- Stephen Leacock (musician) of General Fiasco, an indie rock group from Bellaghy, Northern Ireland

== See also ==
- Lacock
- Laycock - surname
