= Stuart Laycock =

British historian and author

Stuart Laycock is a British historian and author best known for the popular-history book All the Countries We've Ever Invaded: And the Few We Never Got Round To. He has also written extensively on Roman and post-Roman Britain.

== All the Countries We've Ever Invaded ==
All the Countries We've Ever Invaded: And the Few We Never Got Round To (2012) attempts to catalogue every country Britain has ever invaded or made an incursion into, whether they were part of the British Empire or suffered a briefer attack, were threatened, or forced to negotiate. Incursions by privateers, private explorers, etc, are also listed. The book was attacked by Marxist writer Richard Seymour in the Guardian for allegedly trivialising the suffering caused by imperialism. Although the book states it is not pro or anti-empire and is exploring historical facts rather than making moral judgements, Seymour accused it of "moral ambivalence." Seymour also criticised it for elements such as including invasions long before the existence of Britain as a nation, but praised it for showing how British power went far beyond the overt machinery of empire to include economic and other forces.

== Other books ==
Laycock has also written books on late-Roman Britain: Britannia - The Failed State and Warlords: The Struggle for Power in Post-Roman Britain. Warlords advances the theory that the Anglo-Saxon invasion of England was a takeover by a warrior elite. With Miles Russell, he wrote UnRoman Britain, which claims that Britain was not significantly influenced by Roman occupation. Laycock's first book of poetry, Zone:Poems from the Bosnian War, drew on his experiences as an aid worker.
