= Joan P. Alcock =

English archaeologist

Joan Pilsbury Alcock FSA is an archeologist and historian and an Honorary Fellow of London South Bank University. She was elected as a Fellow of the Society of Antiquaries of London on 3 March 1977, a Fellow of the Royal Society for Arts, Manufactures and Commerce on 12 January 1987 and is a member of the Guild of Food Writers.

She was principal lecturer at the School of Hospitality, Food and Product Management, now the School of Applied Sciences, at London South Bank University. As of 2003, she had become an Honorary Visiting Fellow at the same institution.

== Selected publications ==
- Alcock, Joan P. "Life in Ancient Rome". The History Press, 2010.
- Alcock, Joan Pilsbury. Food in the ancient world. Greenwood Publishing Group, 2006.
- Alcock, Joan P. Food in Roman Britain. Tempus, 2001.
- Alcock, Joan P. "The health of the nation campaign: practical plan or farcical information?." Nutrition & Food Science 95.3 (1995): 11-15.
- Alcock, Joan P. "Classical religious belief and burial practice in Roman Britain." Archaeological Journal 137.1 (1980): 50-85.
- Alcock, Joan P. "Celtic water cults in Roman Britain." Archaeological journal 122.1 (1965): 1-12.
- Alcock, Joan P. "Three bronze figurines in the British Museum." The Antiquaries Journal 43.01 (1963): 118-123.
