= Bill Laycock =

Australia international rugby union player

- Born: William Murray Borthwick Laycock; 26 October 1896 Coonamble, New South Wales
- Died: 12 May 1966 (aged 69)

Rugby union career
- Position: flanker
International career
Years	Team	Apps	(Points)
1925–26	Wallabies	4	(0)

William Murray Borthwick Laycock (26 October 1896 – 12 May 1966) was a rugby union player who represented Australia.

Laycock, a flanker, was born in New South Wales and claimed a total of 4 international rugby caps for Australia.
