= Craven Laycock =

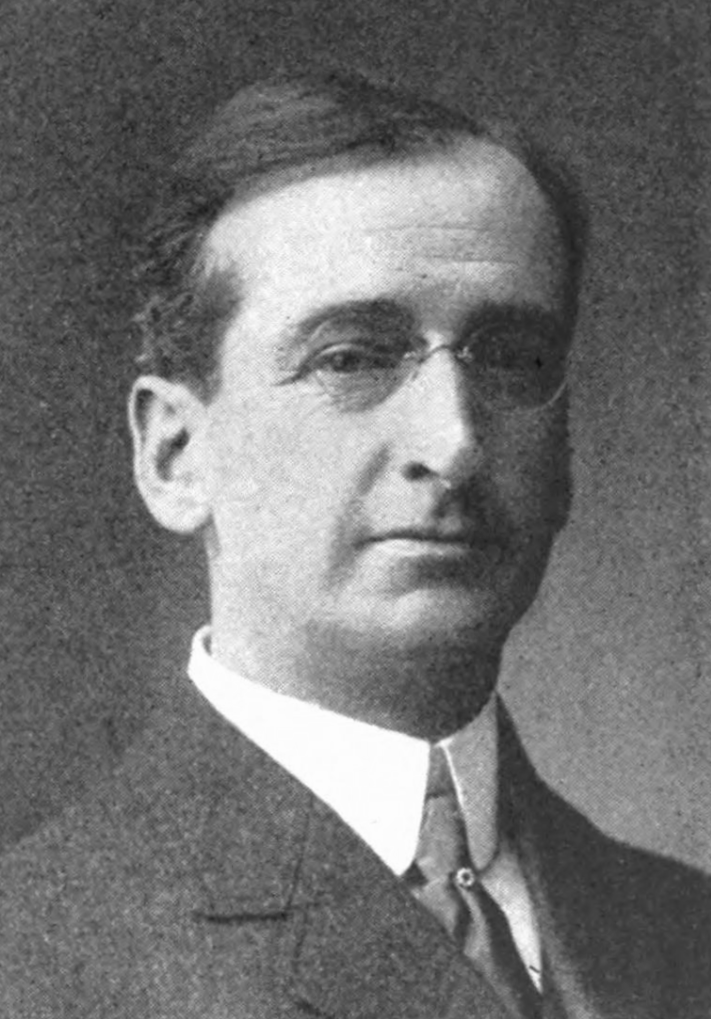
- Born: September 30, 1866; Bradford, Yorkshire, England
- Died: April 4, 1940 (aged 73); Hanover, New Hampshire, United States
- Education: Dartmouth College
- Occupations: Educator, writer
- Spouse: Florence Annette Hill (m. 1900)
- Children: 2

Craven Laycock (1866–1940) was the dean of Dartmouth College from 1911 to 1934. He is perhaps best known as the dean who suspended Theodor Seuss Geisel from editing the Dartmouth humor magazine, after which Geisel wrote under the pen name Dr. Seuss.

== Biography ==
Laycock was born September 30, 1866, in Bradford, Yorkshire, England. In 1882 he and his brothers emigrated to the United States via Halifax, Nova Scotia, settling in Lawrence, Massachusetts. From there the family split up, and Craven ended up in New Hampshire as a student at Dartmouth College, where he graduated in 1896. After becoming a naturalized citizen of the United States on May 2, 1896, he became Assistant Professor of Oratory by 1900. Laycock served as Dean of the College from 1911 until 1934.

He married Florence Annette Hill on April 19, 1900, and they had two daughters.

Craven Laycock died in Hanover, New Hampshire on April 4, 1940.

== Bust ==
Laycock's classmates later commissioned artist Nancy Cox-McCormack to create a bust in his honor. By 1934, it had become the tradition of Dartmouth students to rub the nose of the bust for good luck before exams.

== Books ==
Craven Laycock was the author or co-author of several books on debate, including Argumentation and Debate, co-authored with Robert Leighton Scales, Manual of Argumentation, and Manual of Argumentation: for High Schools and Academies, co-authored with Albion Keith Spofford.
