= History of Cumbria =

History of the English county

The history of Cumbria as a county of England begins with the Local Government Act 1972. Its territory and constituent parts however have a long history under various other administrative and historic units of governance. Cumbria is an upland, coastal and rural area, with a history of invasions, migration and settlement, as well as battles and skirmishes between the English and the Scots.

Cumbria within England

== Overview ==
Cumbria was created as a county in 1974 from territory of the historic counties of Cumberland, Westmorland, Lancashire North of the Sands and a small part of Yorkshire, but the human history of the area is ancient. It is a county of contrasts, with its mountainous central region and lakes, fertile coastal plains in the north and gently undulating hills in the south.

Cumbria now relies on farming as well as tourism as economic bases, but industry has historically also played a vital role in the area's fortunes. For much of its history Cumbria was disputed between England and nearby Scotland. Raids from Scotland were frequent until the Acts of Union 1707 and its long coastline was earlier vulnerable to Irish and Norse raids.

Cumbria has historically been fairly isolated. Until the coming of the railway, much of the region was hard to reach, and even today there are roads which make many motorists a little nervous. In bad winters, some of the central valleys are occasionally cut off from the outside world. Enclaves of Brythonic Celts remained until around the 10th century, long after much of England was essentially 'English'; and the Norse retained a distinct identity well into the Middle Ages. After that Cumbria remained something of a 'no mans' land' between Scotland and England, which meant that the traditional Cumbrian identity was neither English nor Scottish.

This article is about the area (and its inhabitants) that became the county of Cumbria in 1974, and continues to be a ceremonial county since 2023. Although the term Cumbria was in use in the 10th century AD, this was a description of an entity belonging to the small Kingdom of Strathclyde. In the 12th century, Cumberland and Westmorland came into existence as administrative counties.

== Prehistoric Cumbria ==
'Prehistoric Cumbria' describes that part of north-west England, subsequently the county of Cumbria, prior to the coming of the Romans. Barrowclough puts the archaeological record of the county (as of 2010) at '443 stone tools, 187 metal objects and 134 pots', plus the various monuments such as henges, stone circles, and the like. The survival of these objects has been influenced by processes such as the rise in sea levels on the west coast, erosion, deposition practices, industrial and agricultural development, and the changing interests and capabilities of antiquarians and archaeologists.

The first permanent inhabitants of the Cumbria region were based in caves during the Mesolithic era. The Neolithic saw the construction of monuments and the running of the axe 'factory' from which stone axes were carried around the country. The Bronze Age saw continuity with the Neolithic way of living and Iron Age Cumbria saw the establishment of the Celtic tribes – possibly those called the Carvetii and Setantii by the Romans.

=== Late Upper Palaeolithic, c. 12670–9600 BC: the earliest human inhabitants ===
The first evidence found for human occupation in Cumbria is that at Kirkhead Cave, in Lower Allithwaite, during the Federmesser culture period (c. 11400–10800 BC). Discussing the Kirkhead Cave finds, Barrowclough quotes an earlier source who says: "Although limited, the Late Upper Paleolithic material from Cumbria is the earliest evidence of settlement in Britain this far north-west and as such is of national importance." (Perhaps this should now read "settlement in England", rather than Britain, as a cave site in Scotland has since been found). Talking of the archaeological finds, he also says: "Lithic material from Kirkhead Cave near Grange ... has been dated to ... c. 11000–9500 BC" (See: Lithic flake). Other lithic blades were found at Lindale Low Cave at the mouth of the River Kent, in caves at Blenkett Wood, Allithwaite, and at Bart's Shelter, Furness (including reindeer and elk bones).

During the following Younger Dryas stadial (colder period), c. 10890–9650 BC, Federmesser sites were abandoned, and Cumbria (along with the rest of Britain) was not permanently occupied until the end of the Younger Dryas period, 11,600 years ago (that is, during the Mesolithic era).

=== Mesolithic, c. 9600–4000 BC ===
The Mesolithic era in Cumbria saw a warming of the climate.

It is thought that settlers made their way across Morecambe Bay and along the fertile coast. At that time the upland central region of the county was heavily forested, so humans probably kept to the coastal areas, and around estuaries in particular: "sheltered locations around estuaries, lagoons or marine inlets" "The reason is probably due to the variety and abundance of food resources combined with fresh water and shelter that make estuaries more favoured locations than purely coastal sites".

Evidence for the Early Mesolithic period in Cumbria is largely confined to finds in caves. In the 1990s, human bones were found in Kents Bank Cavern (in the north Morecambe Bay area) which were in 2013 dated to the early Mesolithic, making the find "the most northerly early Mesolithic human remains in the British Isles". Horse and elk remains, from an earlier date, were also found. For the Late Mesolithic, evidence comes from pits at Monk Moors and burning of heathland in the Eden Valley floodplain.

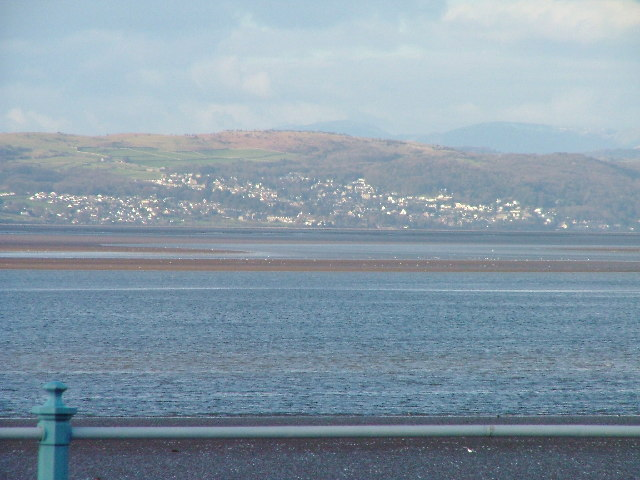
Kents Bank, Cumbria

In the north Cumbrian plain, around the Carlisle area and into southern Scotland, evidence has been found for woodland clearance and deliberate fire-setting as a method of managing the landscape during the Mesolithic period.

Large Mesolithic flint-chipping sites, where flints washed up from the Irish Sea were worked into tools, have been found at Eskmeals, near Ravenglass on the west coast, and at Walney in the south. At Williamson's Moss in the Eskmeals area, Bonsall discovered 34,000 pieces of worked flint (pebble flint), chert and tuff, plus wooden raft-like structures that suggest permanent or semi-permanent settlement by the wandering hunter-gatherer population. Over 30,000 artefacts were discovered at Monk Moors, also part of the Eskmeals raised shoreline area. These sites were probably used across several thousands of years, not just during the Mesolithic.

=== Neolithic, c. 4500–2350 BC ===
There is much more visible evidence of Neolithic activity than of any earlier period. This consists mostly of finds of axes and the presence of monuments (stone circles, cairns). However, "there are few settlement traces represented either by physical structures or surface flintwork ... pottery finds are ... very poorly represented in Cumbria". This was a time of technological advances and population expansion. The change from Mesolithic to Neolithic in Cumbria was gradual and continual. The change "is marked by the appearance of ... leaf-shaped arrowheads, scrapers and polished stone axes together with pottery and ceremonial and funerary monuments".

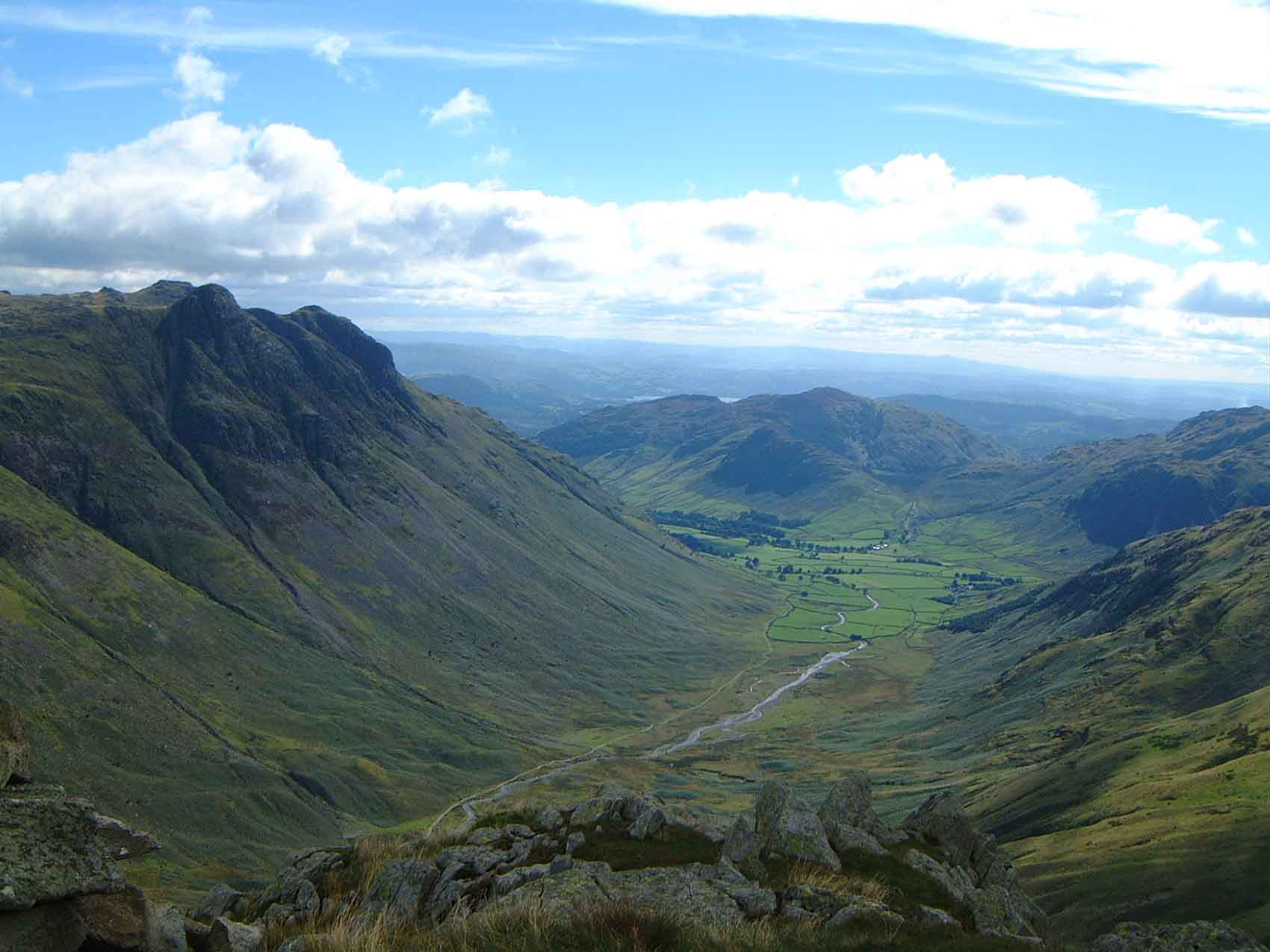
Great Langdale, site of the Langdale Axe Factory

At some time, the Mesolithic coastal communities must have moved further inland, probably following rivers along valley corridors into the heart of Lakeland. But we do not know how many moved. "The small amount of early Neolithic flintwork from the coastal plain has been taken to suggest a move away from the coast inland where the monuments of the Neolithic tend to be located. An alternative view suggests that the same level of coastal settlement and exploitation that had been common in the Mesolithic continued into the Neolithic, but that in the later period there was also an expansion of activity into other parts of the landscape"

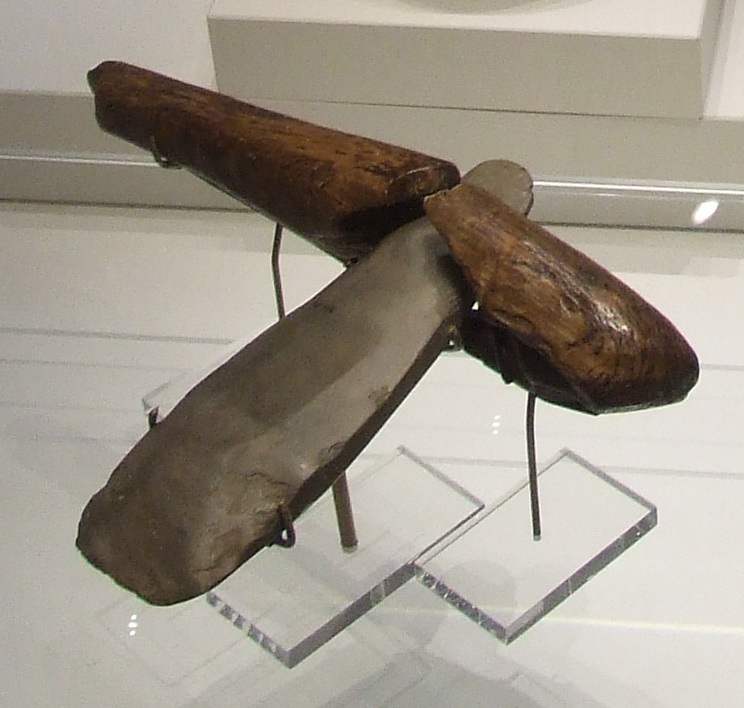
Neolithic stone axe with handle from Ehenside Tarn (now in the British Museum)

The best-known Neolithic site in the West Cumbrian Plain is Ehenside Tarn near Beckermet, with roughout (unfinished) and polished axes, plain bowl pottery, cattle and deer bones. The evidence of deer bones here and at Bardsea in South Cumbria suggests a continuation of hunter-gathering alongside more settled, agricultural, means of living. Ehenside points up the use of wetland areas by Neolithic Cumbrians: The finds there were discovered when the Tarn was drained. "Wetland areas, whether open water or bog, were foci for beliefs and ritual practices alongside contemporary monuments, and it is, therefore, interesting to note there was a standing stone near Ehenside Tarn".

South Cumbria, and especially Furness and Walney, is the area where most of the axe finds have been made (67 examples – accounting for half of the total of axe finds in Cumbria). This is probably due to the area's proximity to the so-called 'Langdale Axe Factory'. Many of the axes seem to have been intentionally deposited in moss areas and in fissures in rocks.

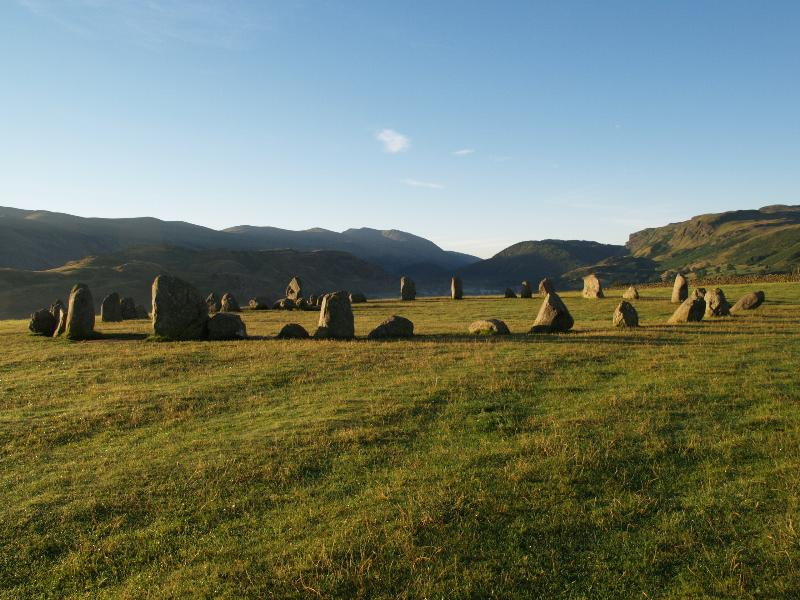
Castlerigg Stone Circle

Indeed, that axe factory is perhaps the most famous and important find of Neolithic activity in Cumbria: Many thousands of axe heads were made there from the green volcanic tuff found on the Pike O'Stickle from around 6000 BCE. The axe heads were not only for local use in weapons: They have been found widely over the United Kingdom from Norfolk to Northern Ireland, and seem to have often been used for ceremonial or ritual purposes.

Also at this time, possibly reflecting economic power created by the Axe Factory, stone circles and henges began to be built across the county. Indeed, "Cumbria has one of the largest number of preserved field monuments in England". The Neolithic examples include the impressive henge at Mayburgh, near Penrith, and a partly destroyed one at nearby King Arthur's Round Table (KART); as well as the Castlerigg Stone Circle above Keswick. The megalith Long Meg, along with Little Meg and a circle at Glassonby may also have been erected at this time, although they are also possibly early Bronze Age in date.

Some of the stones have designs (spirals, circles, grooves and cup-marks) on them which may have indicated the presence of other monuments or gathering-places and/or signalled the trackways and other routes through the landscape, particularly through the river valleys to sources of food, to ritual gathering places, or to sources of axes.

As well as providing focal points for the gathering of people for the purposes of trade, of ritual, and, in the Late Neolithic, for more 'tenurial' settlement and ownership of land, the stone circles probably had cosmological uses as well. For example, the Long Meg stone itself, which stands outside its accompanying circle, is aligned with the circle's centre on the point of the midwinter sunset. The use of different coloured stones here is possibly linked to observations made at the times of equinoxes and solstices.

=== Bronze Age, c. 2500–700 BC ===
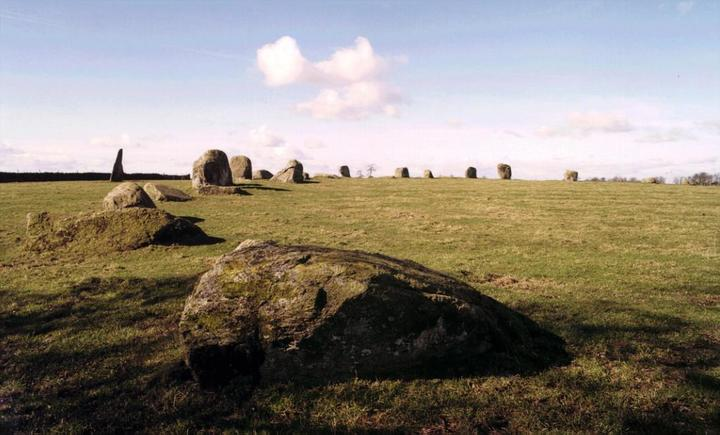
Long Meg and Her Daughters

By the Bronze Age, settlements in Cumbria are likely to have taken a much more permanent form. Like the transition from Mesolithic to Neolithic, the transition from Neolithic to Early Bronze Age was gradual and continuity of sites is likely. Unlike in southern England, where the transition is marked by the 'Beaker Period', in Cumbria and the north-west burials with beaker pottery are rare, with only a handful of such burials recorded. (Instead, circular wooden and then stone structures subsequently sealed by cairns and used over centuries was the preferred method.)

In the Early Bronze Age, evidence of greatly increased woodland clearing combined with cereal growing has been found in the pollen record for the North Cumbrian Plain, Solway Firth and the coastal areas. Very little evidence of occupation exists, although a number of potential sites have been identified by aerial photographic work. The site at Plasketlands seems typical of "a combination of arable, grazing, peat, alluvium and marine resources".

Collared urns have been found at sites such as the former Garlands Hospital (now the Carleton Clinic near Carlisle), Aughertree Fell, Aglionby, and at Eskmeals (with a cist burial, cremation pits, and a flint-knapping site). Activity round the Morecambe Bay region seems to have been less than in the West Cumbrian Coastal Plain, although there is evidence for significant settlement on Walney Island, and at Sizergh, Levens Park and Allithwaite where Beaker burials took place.

This southern area of the county also has approximately 85 examples of perforated axe-hammers, rarely found in the rest of the county. These, like the Neolithic stone axes, seem to have been deposited deliberately (with axe finds being more coastal in distribution). The increase in the use of these perforated axes probably accounted for the decline in the Langdale axe factory which occurred c. 1500 BCE. "New designs of perforated stone axes were developed, and Langdale tuffs were discovered by experiment to be too fragile to allow perforation." Non-perforated axes were abandoned and other sources of lithic material were sought from other parts of the England. Copper and bronze tools only seem to have arrived in Cumbria very gradually through the 2nd millennium. Indeed, by c. 1200 BCB there is evidence of a breakdown in technology usage and trade between the northern, highland areas, including Cumbria, and the southern areas of the country. This was not compensated for by home-grown metallurgical working.

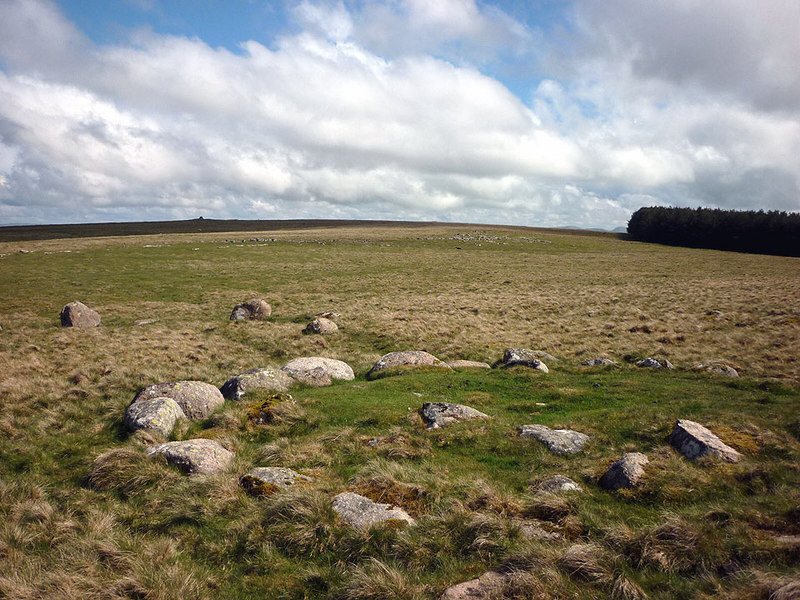
Cairn circle, Oddendale

In terms of burial practices, both inhumations (burials of non-cremated bodies) and cremations took place in Cumbria, with cremations (268) being more favoured than inhumations (51). Most burials were associated with cairns (26) but other monuments were also used: round barrows (14); 'flat' cemeteries (12); stone circles (9); plus use of ring cairns, standing stones and other monuments. Burials for inhumations (in barrows and cairns) are found on the surface, as at Oddendale, or in pits, usually with a cist formed in it, as at Moor Divock, Askham. Cremation burials may also be found "in a pit, cist, below a pavement, or roughly enclosed by a stone cist". Often, there are multiple burials not associated with any monument – another indication of continuity with Neolithic practice. Cremated bones placed in food vessels was followed by a later practice of placement in collared or uncollared urns, although many burials had no urns involved at all. A capping stone was often placed on the urn, which could be either upright or inverted. Ritualistic deposition into Cumbrian grave-sites include: broken artefacts, such as single beads from a necklace (as at Ewanrigg); sherds of Beaker or Collared Urn pottery; bone pins, buttons, jet, slate, clay ornaments; ochre, or red porphyry and quartz crystals (as at Birkrigg, Urswick); knives, daggers and hunting equipment.

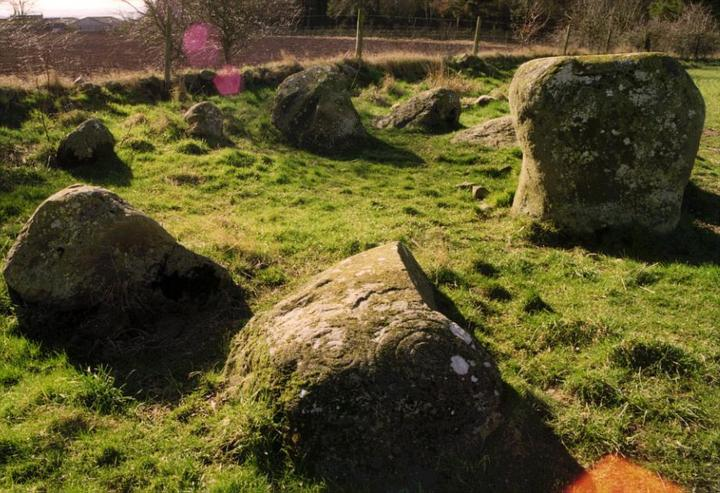
Little Meg – a Bronze Age ring cairn with spiral rock art

Bronze Age artefacts have been uncovered throughout the county, including several bronze axe heads around Kendal and Levens, an axe and a sword at Gleaston, a rapier near the hamlet of Salta, an intriguing carved granite ball near Carlisle and part of a gold necklace believed to be from France or Ireland found at Greysouthen. A timber palisade has also been discovered at High Crosby near Carlisle. Again, there is continuity between Bronze-age and Neolithic practice of deposition. There seems to be an association between the distribution of stone perforated axe-hammers and bronze metalwork deposition in the area of Furness. Of the approximately 200 bronze implements found in Cumbria, about half have been found in the Furness and Cartmel region. Most are flanged axes (21), and flanged spearheads (21), palstaves (20), and flat and socketed axes (16 each). Early Bronze Age metalwork distribution is largely along communication valleys (such as the Eden valley), and on the Furness and West Cumbrian plains, with evidence on the west coast (for example, a find at Maryport) of connections with Ireland. In the Middle Bronze Age, deposition seems to have switched from burials to wet places, presumably for ritualistic reasons. In the Late Bronze Age, socketed axe finds are the most common (62), but are rare in West Cumbria, which also lacks finds of the angle-flanged type. Hoards (two or more items) of deposited Bronze Age metalwork are rare in Cumbria, (notably at Ambleside, Hayton, Fell Lane, Kirkhead Cave, Skelmore Heads), for reasons that are still being discussed. Most are from the Middle Bronze Age period.

As mentioned above, evidence of actual metalworking in Cumbria during this period is scarce. There is some sign of copper ore extraction around the Coniston area, but the most notable find is of a tuyère, (a clay pipe connecting the bellows to a furnace), found at Ewanrigg and which is a rare example from the Early Bronze Age. Two-part stone moulds have also been found at Croglin.

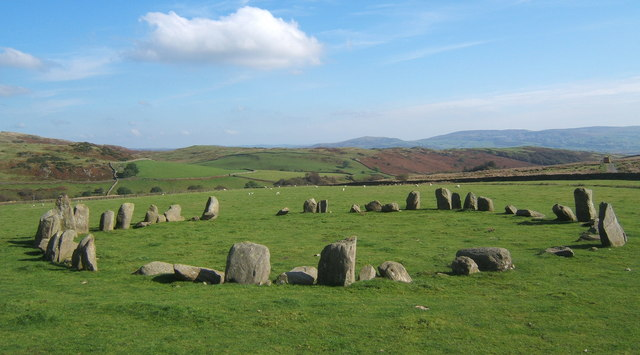
Swinside stone circle

Ritual or 'religious' sites can be seen across the county and are often clearly visible. Cairns and round barrows can be found throughout the area and a cemetery has been discovered near Allithwaite. More impressive remains include stone circles, such as Birkrigg stone circle, Long Meg and Her Daughters, Swinside, and Little Meg. 32 bronze artefacts have been discovered in the Furness district covering a long period of time (c. 2300–500 BCE), suggesting that this region was held to have special meaning to the people there. In the Late Bronze Age, defended hilltop settlements along the northern shore of Morecambe Bay, with metalworking, special functions and long-term deposition of artefacts associated with them, were probably precursors to later Iron Age hill-forts. However, many of these defended settlements appear to have been abandoned, probably due to a deterioration in the climate from c. 1250 BCE to roughly the beginning of the Iron Age.

=== Iron Age, c. 800 BC–100 AD ===
The Iron Age in Britain saw the arrival of Celtic culture – including certain art forms and languages – as well as the obvious increase in the production of iron. The people of Great Britain and Ireland were divided into various tribes: In Cumbria the Carvetii may have dominated most of the county for a time, perhaps being based in the Solway Plain and centred on Carlisle, although an alternative view has their pre-Roman centre at Clifton Dykes. The Setantii were possibly situated in the south of the county, until both were perhaps incorporated into the Brigantes who occupied much of northern England. (The status – especially that of the relationship with the Brigantes – and location of the Carvetii and Setantii is disputed by historians). They probably spoke Cumbric, a variety of the ancient British language of Brythonic, (or Common Brittonic), the predecessor of modern Welsh, and probably named some of the county's topographical features such as its rivers (e.g. Kent, Eden, Cocker, Levens) and mountains (e.g. Blencathra).

There appear to be many remains of Iron Age settlement in Cumbria, including hill forts such as those at Maiden Castle and Dunmallard Hill and many hundreds of smaller settlements and field systems. However, securely dateable evidence of Iron Age activity in Cumbria is thin. In North Cumbria, hillforts have been dated to c. 500 BCE at Carrock Fell and Swarthy Hill, as well as a burial at Rise Hill and a bog body at Scaleby Moss.

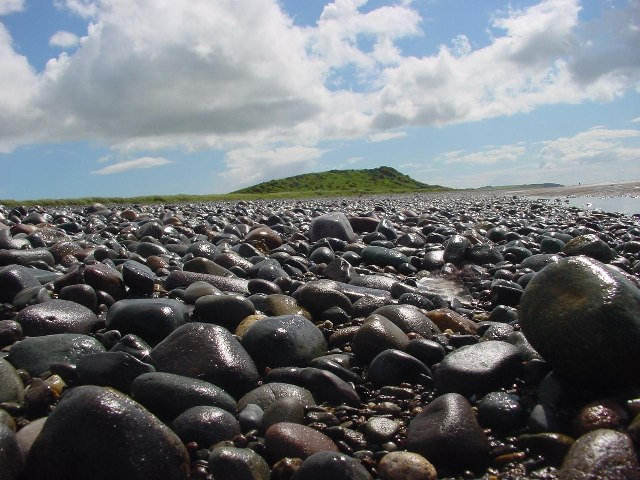
Swarthy Hill, near Crosscanonby on the Solway coast – possible site of Iron Age hillfort, later the site of mile-fortlet 21 in Roman times

A large number of enclosure sites have been identified from aerial photographs in the Solway Plain. There are also possible sites re-used by the Romans at Bousted Hill and Fingland, as well as at Ewanrigg and Edderside. Early Iron Age finds in West Cumbria are limited to sites at Eskmeals and Seascale Moss (with another bog body). In the south, 'hillforts' have been identified at Skelmore Heads, Castle Head, Warton Crag and an enclosure at Urswick. However, Cumbria appears not to have any of the so-called 'developed hillforts' (enlarged from earlier versions, around 3–7 ha in area, with multiple ditches and complex entrances), suggesting that few, if any, were still being used in the pre-Roman Iron Age, apparently having been abandoned.

The abandonment of land and settlements noted above is probably explained by climate change. Between c. 1250 BCE and c. 800 BCE, the climate deteriorated to the extent that, in Cumbria, upland areas and marginal areas of cultivation were no longer sustainable. Woodland clearing happened, however, combined with signs of increased soil erosion: production capacity may have been seriously affected, with agriculture being forcibly replaced by pastoralism, and with a resultant "population crisis" at the beginning of the Iron Age.

However, an improvement in climatic conditions from c. 800 BCE to c. 100 CE occurred. A major de-forestation period, linked to increased cereal production, seems to have taken place (according to pollen records) towards the end of the 1st millennium BC. This is also associated with a slight rise in sea level that may explain the lack of evidence for low-lying settlements. There is sparse evidence for the Late Iron Age and early Romano-British periods. Nevertheless, enclosures seen from aerial photography in upland areas such as Crosby Garrett and Crosby Ravensworth, together with similar evidence from the Solway Plain and Eden Valley, (see the section below on Life in Roman Cumbria for a listing of the main sites), point to the populous nature of the territory held by the Brigantes (as noted by Tacitus in the 'Agricola'). The view of historians now seems to be that the hillforts were becoming centres of economic activity and were less in the nature of dominating power-centres. "Indeed, the north-west, far from being a backward region of Britain in the late Iron Age, can be seen as progressive and entrepreneurial." This was true, however, only in certain areas of the north-west: the Solway Plain, the Eden and Lune valleys, and perhaps southern Cumbria and Cheshire, which may have been "thriving".

The traditional Iron Age roundhouse, enclosed by a ditch and revetted bank, was used by the Carvetii. Sometimes, dry-stone walls were used instead of the bank. However, a roundhouse at Wolsty Hall has two opposed entrances and a ring-grooved external wall, which may indicate a northern, regional variety of roundhouse building.

(Later, in the mid-Roman period, probably in the 3rd century, a change took place in that the round structures were replaced by rectilinear buildings on some sites).

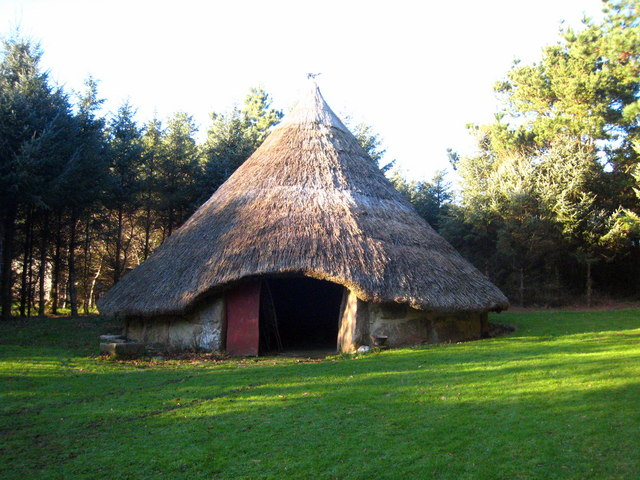
Iron Age roundhouse reconstruction

Most of the population, the total size of which at its peak has been estimated at between 20,000–30,000 people, lived in scattered communities, usually consisting of just a single family group. They practised mixed agriculture, with enclosures for arable use, but also with enclosed and unenclosed pasture fields.

Evidence of burial practices is extremely rare. Inhumations have been found at Risehow, and possibly at Butts Beck (crouched individuals in pits and ditches) as well as two very rare cemeteries with multiple individuals (only approximately 30 Iron Age cemeteries exist in Britain in total) at Nelson Square, Levens and at Crosby Garrett. The Butts Beck burial included the body of a 'warrior' along with his weapons and a horse (although this might have been a horse and cart burial, rather than a warrior one, with the wooden cart having rotted away). The bog body at Scaleby and the one at Seascale are difficult to date, and, since the excavations were done in the 19th century and lacked today's archaeological techniques, the evidence for Druidical ritual sacrifice, as appears with some other bog bodies in Britain and Europe, is not present in the Cumbrian examples. However, both bodies were buried with a wooden stick or wand, which conforms to other bog-burial practice elsewhere. The finding of stone heads at Anthorn and at Rickerby Park, Carlisle, also conforms to the Celtic cult of the severed head and ritualistic sacrifice. This may be true also of the bronze buckets or cauldrons deposited at Bewcastle and at Ravenstonedale which indicate connections with Ireland. The early name of Carlisle, 'Luguvalium', meaning 'belonging to Luguvalos', suggests a tribal chief in charge who had a personal name that meant 'strong as Lugus'. This indicates a possible affinity of the tribe there (perhaps the Carvetii) to the Celtic god Lugus, whose festival, Lugnasad, occurred on 1 August, accompanied by various sacrifices.

Hoards of deposited Cumbrian Iron Age metalwork show evidence of a regional variation, with Cumbrian hoards being mostly of weapons buried off-site and consisting of small numbers of items. This fits the picture of Iron Age Cumbria, as with the rest of the north-west, consisting mostly of small, scattered, farmsteads. In the 18th century a beautiful iron sword with a bronze scabbard, dating from around 50 BCE, was found at Embleton near Cockermouth; it is now in the British Museum.

== Roman Cumbria ==
Roman Cumbria was in the far north-west of Roman Britain. The decision to conquer the area was taken by the Romans after the revolt of Venutius threatened to make the Brigantes and their allies, such as the Carvetii, into anti-Roman tribes, rather than pro-Roman ones which had previously been the case. After a period of conquest and consolidation, based on the Stanegate line, with some coastal defences added, Hadrian decided to make the previous turf wall into a solid one. Although abandoned briefly in favour of the more northerly Antonine Wall, the Hadrianic line was fallen back upon and remained for the rest of the Roman period.

Such unrest as occurred during the Roman occupation seems to have been the result of either incursions by tribes to the north of the Wall, or as the result of factional disputes in Rome in which the Cumbrian military was caught up. There is no evidence of the Brigantian federation stirring up trouble. Romanisation of the population may therefore have occurred to varying degrees, especially near the forts.

=== Conquest and consolidation, 71–117 AD ===
After the Romans' initial conquest of Britain in 43 AD, the territory of the Brigantes remained independent of Roman rule for some time. At that time the leader of the Brigantes was the queen Cartimandua, whose husband Venutius might have been a Carvetian and may therefore be responsible for the incorporation of Cumbria into the Brigantian federation. It may be that Cartimandua ruled the Brigantian peoples east of the Pennines (possibly with a centre at Stanwick), while Venutius was the chief of the Brigantes (or Carvetii) west of the Pennines in Cumbria (with a possible centre based at Clifton Dykes.)

Despite retaining nominal independence, Cartimandua and Venutius were loyal to the Romans and in return were offered protection by their Imperial neighbours. But the royal couple divorced, and Venutius led two rebellions against his ex-wife. The first, in the 50s AD, was quashed by the Romans, but the second, in AD 69, came at a time of political instability in the Empire and resulted in the Romans evacuating Cartimandua and leaving Venutius to reign over the Brigantes.

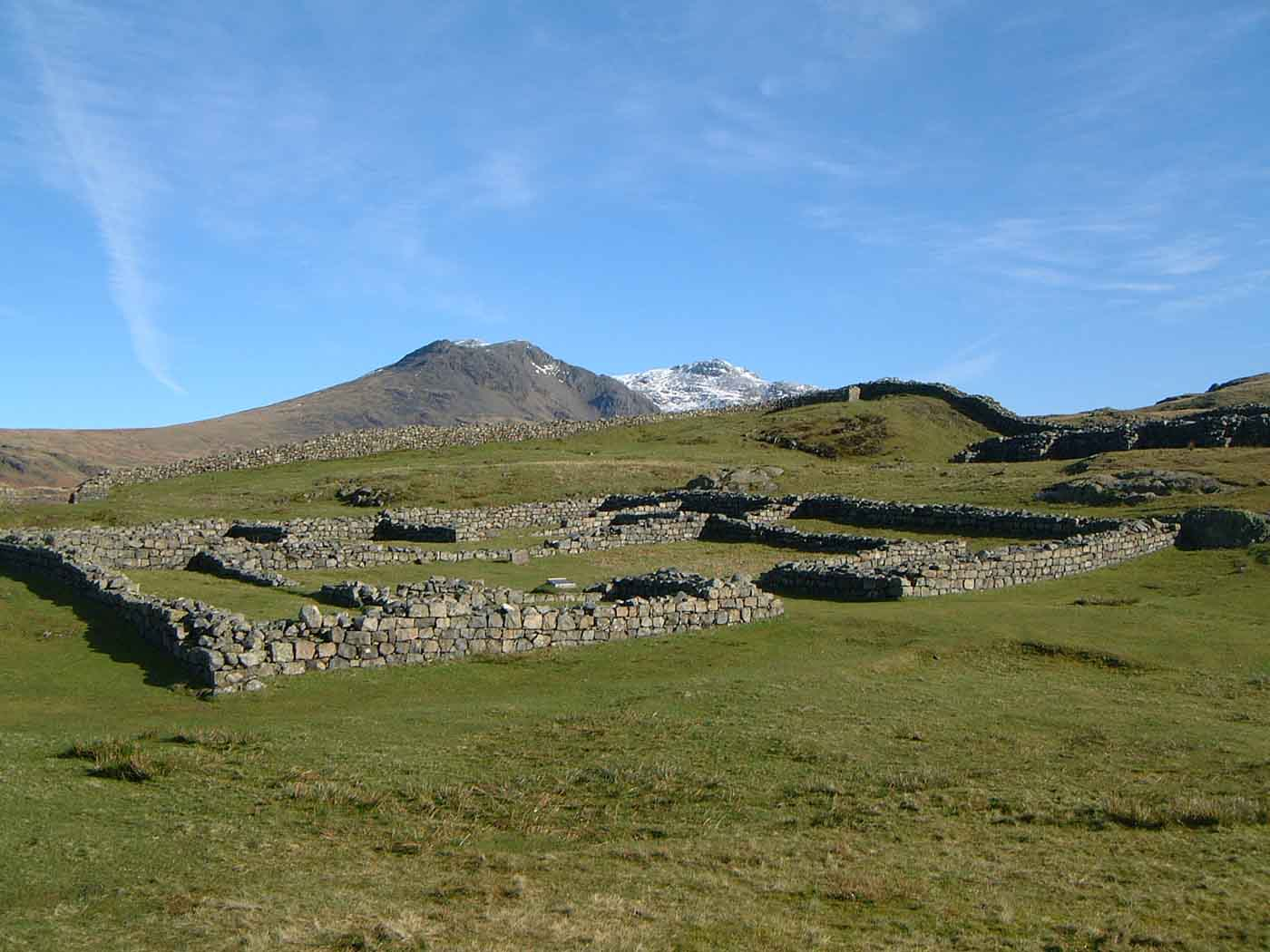
Hardknott Roman Fort

The Romans could not accept a formerly pro-Roman tribe the size of the Brigantes now being anti-Roman, so the Roman conquest of the Brigantes began two years later. Tacitus gives pride of place in the conquest of the north to Agricola (his father-in-law), who was later governor of Britain during 77–83 AD. However, it is thought that much had been achieved under the previous governorships of Vettius Bolanus (governor 69–71 AD), and of Quintus Petillius Cerialis (governor 71–74 AD). From other sources, it seems that Bolanus had possibly dealt with Venutius and penetrated into Scotland, and evidence from the carbon-dating of the gateway timbers of the Roman fort at Carlisle (Luguvalium) suggest that they were felled in 72 AD, during the governorship of Cerialis. Nevertheless, Agricola played his part in the west as commander of the legion XX Valeria Victrix, while Cerialis led the IX Hispania in the east. In addition, the Legio II Adiutrix sailed from Chester up river estuaries to cause surprise to the enemy.

At some point, part of Cerialis's force moved across the Stainmore Pass from Corbridge westwards to join Agricola. The two forces then moved up from the vicinity of Penrith to Carlisle, establishing the fort there in 72/73AD.

Eventually, a consolidation based on the line of the Stanegate road (between Carlisle and Corbridge) was settled upon. Carlisle was the seat of a 'centurio regionarius' (or 'district commissioner'), indicating its important status.

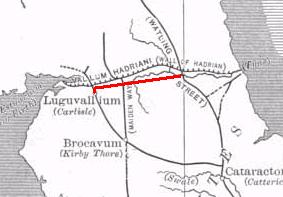
The Stanegate line is marked in red, to the south of the later Hadrian's Wall. (n.b. Brocavum is Brougham, not Kirkby Thore as given in the map)

The years 87 AD – 117 AD were ones of consolidation of the northern frontier area. Only a few sites north of the Stanegate line were maintained, and the signs are that an orderly withdrawal to the Solway-Tyne line was made. There does not seem to have been any rout caused as a result of battles with various tribes.

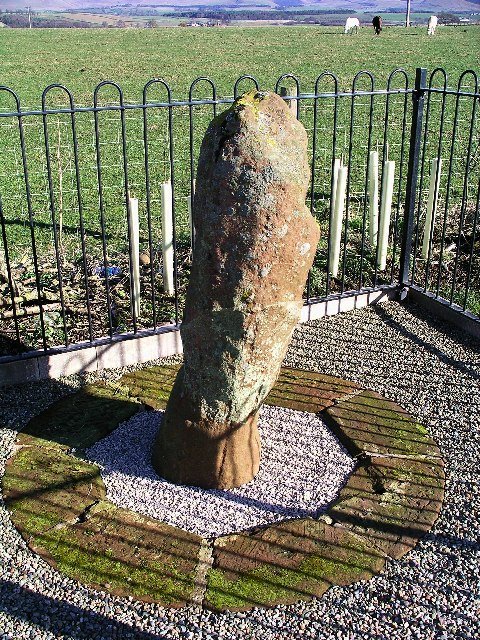
Roman milestone still in situ by the A66 near Kirkby Thore

Apart from the Stanegate line, other forts existed along the Solway Coast at Beckfoot, Maryport, Burrow Walls (near to the present town of Workington) and Moresby (near to Whitehaven). These forts have Hadrianic inscriptions, but some (Beckfoot, for example), may have dated From the late 1st century. The road running from Carlisle to Maryport had turf-and-timber forts along it at Old Carlisle (Red Dial), Caer Mote, and Papcastle (which may have had special responsibility for looking after the largely untouched Lake District region). The forts in the east along the Eden and Lune valley road at Old Penrith, Brougham and Low Borrow Bridge may have been enlarged, but the evidence is scanty. A fort at Troutbeck may have been established from the period of Trajan (emperor 98 AD – 117 AD) onwards, along with an uncertain road running between Old Penrith and/or Brougham, through Troutbeck (and possibly an undiscovered fort in the Keswick area) to Papcastle and Maryport. Other forts that may have been established during this period include one at Ambleside (Galava), positioned to take advantage of ship-borne supply to the forts of the Lake District. From here, a road was constructed during the Trajanic period to Hardknott where a fort was built (the fort at Ravenglass, where the road eventually finished, was built in the following reign of Hadrian (117 AD – 138 AD)). A road between Ambleside to Old Penrith and/or Brougham, going over High Street, may also date from this period. From the fort at Kirkby Thore (Bravoniacum), which stood on the road from York to Brougham (following the present A66), there was also a road, the Maiden Way, that ran north across Alston Edge to the fort at Whitley Castle (Epiacum) and on to the one at Carvoran on the Wall. In the south of the county, forts may have existed from this period south of Ravenglass and in the Barrow and Cartmel region. The only one that survives is at Watercrook (Kendal).

=== Hadrian, Antoninus and Severus, 117–211 AD ===
Between 117 and 119, there may have been a war with the Britons, perhaps in the western part of the northern region, involving the tribes in the Dumfries and Galloway area. The response was to provide a frontier zone in the western sector of forts and milecastles, built of turf and timber (the "Turf Wall"), the standard construction method (although some have suggested it was because "turf and timber were preferred on the Solway plain, where stone is scarce").

For whatever reason, this was not enough for the emperor Hadrian (emperor 117 AD – 138 AD). Perhaps the decision to build the Wall was taken because of the seriousness of the military situation, or because it fitted in with the new emperor's wish to consolidate the gains of the empire and to delimit its expansion, as happened on the German frontier, (or possibly both). Hadrian, who was something of an amateur architect, came to Britain in 122 AD to oversee the building of a more solid frontier (along with other measures elsewhere in England). It is possible that Hadrian stayed at Vindolanda (in present-day Northumberland) while planning the wall. Building of Hadrian's Wall along the line of Agricola's earlier garrisons began in 122 AD and was mostly completed in less than ten years, such was the efficiency of the Roman military. It ran from Bowness on the Solway Firth across the north of the county and through Northumberland to Wallsend on the Tyne estuary, with additional military installations running down the Cumbrian coast from Bowness to Risehow, south of Maryport, in an integrated fashion (and with forts at Burrow Walls and Moresby that were perhaps not part of the system).

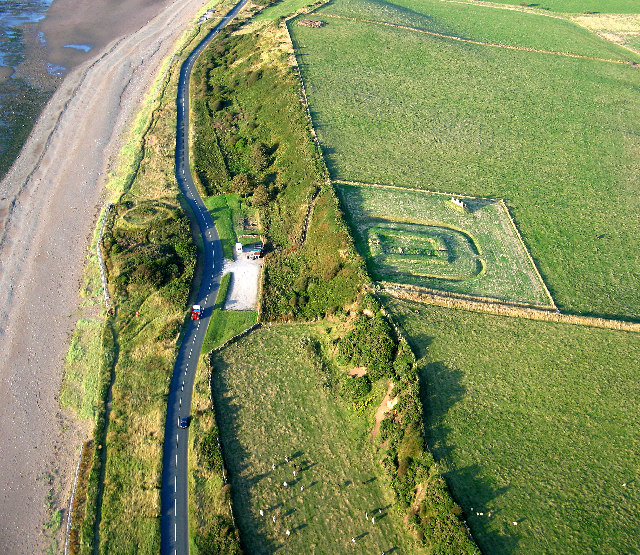
Milefortlet 21 at Crosscanonby on the Cumbrian coast, with later, 18th-century, saltpans across the road to the left

There were several forts and milecastles along the Cumbrian half of the wall, the largest of which was Petriana (Stanwix), housing a cavalry regiment and which was probably the Wall's headquarters (perhaps indicating that the serious unrest was taking place in this western sector of the frontier, or perhaps it was halfway along the distance of the Wall plus the Solway coast installations). Nothing of Petriana has survived, the largest visible remains in Cumbria now belong to the fort at Birdoswald – very little of the Wall itself can be seen in Cumbria. Running to the north of the Wall was a ditch, and to the south an earthwork (the Vallum). Initially, forts were maintained on the Stanegate line, but in around 124 AD – 125 AD the decision was taken to build forts on the Wall itself, and the Stanegate ones were closed down. The Roman forts of Cumbria are "auxiliary forts" – that is, housing auxiliary units of infantry and cavalry, rather than a legion, as at Chester. So-called 'outpost-forts', with road links to the Wall, were built north of the Wall, probably at about the time the Wall itself was built in its turf and timber form. They include Bewcastle and Netherby in Cumbria, and Birrens in Dumfriesshire.

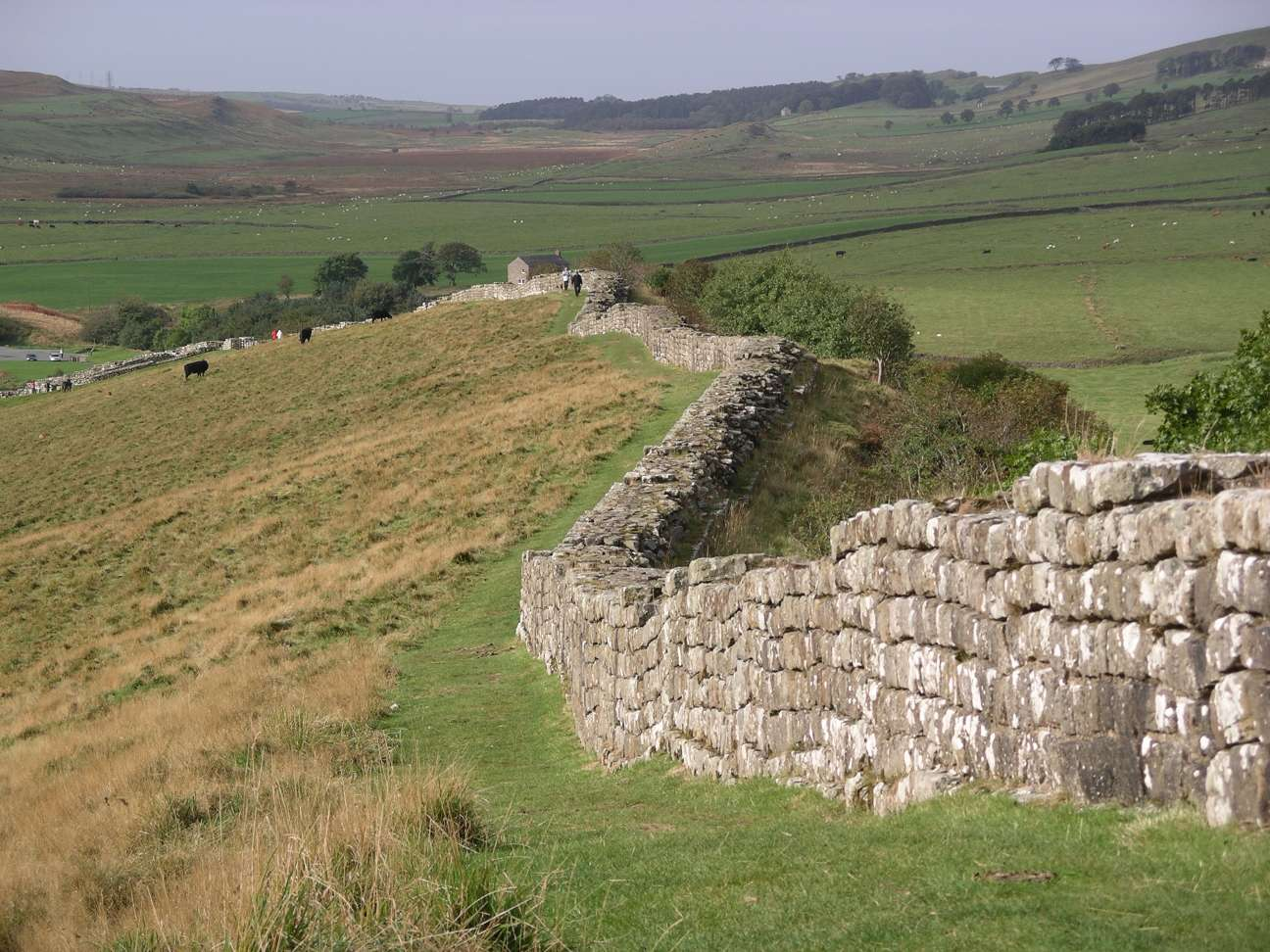
Hadrian's Wall

Only twenty years after Hadrian's Wall was started, Antoninus Pius (emperor 138 AD – 161 AD) almost completely abandoned it in 138 AD, a few months after his accession, turning his attentions to his own frontier fortification, the Antonine Wall across central Scotland. Perhaps he wanted to include possible enemies (and friends) within a frontier zone, rather than beyond it, as with Hadrian's scheme. The two walls were not held in conjunction and the coastal fortifications were de-militarised as well. But Antoninus failed to secure control of southern Scotland and the Romans returned to Hadrian's Wall, which was re-furbished, in 164 AD, after which garrisons were retained there until the early 5th century.

The Wall had cut the Carvetti's territory in half and it is possible that there was a certain amount of local raiding and uncertainty derived from them and possibly other local tribes to the north of the Wall. The early 160s saw troubles of some kind on the northern frontier. Continual building of the northern frontier region took place during the turn of the 2nd and 3rd centuries, indicating further troubles. In around 180, the Wall was crossed by hostile forces who defeated one of the Roman armies. However, in the 170s and 180s the real pressure, in terms of disturbances, seems to have come from tribes much further north – the Caledones in particular. Events came to a head when the emperor Septimius Severus, intending to attack the Caledones, established himself at York in 209 AD, designating it the capital of the northern region (although this region, Britannia Inferior, may not have been formally established until after his death in 211). He also strengthened Hadrian's Wall and he may have established the "civitas" (a form of local government) of the Carvetii with its centre at Carlisle (Luguvalium).

=== Prosperity, troubles, and the 'return to tribalism', 211–410 AD ===
The settlement of Severus, carried forward diplomatically by his son Caracalla, led to a period of relative peace in the north, which may have lasted for most of the 3rd-century (we are severely hampered by the lack of sources concerning the northern frontier for most of the 3rd century, so this may be a false picture). For the first half of the century, it appears that the forts were kept in good repair and the coastal defences were probably not being used regularly. Power may have been shared between the Civitas and the Roman military. Some forts, such as Hardknott and Watercrook, may have been de-militarised, and parts of the Wall seem to have fallen into disrepair. Evidence of smaller barrack-blocks being built, as at Birdoswald, suggest reduced manning by the army and a sharing between the military and civilian population. Changes in the military across the empire, (such as advancement of soldiers not from the senatorial classes plus greater use of 'barbarian' skilled workers), led to a more lax discipline.

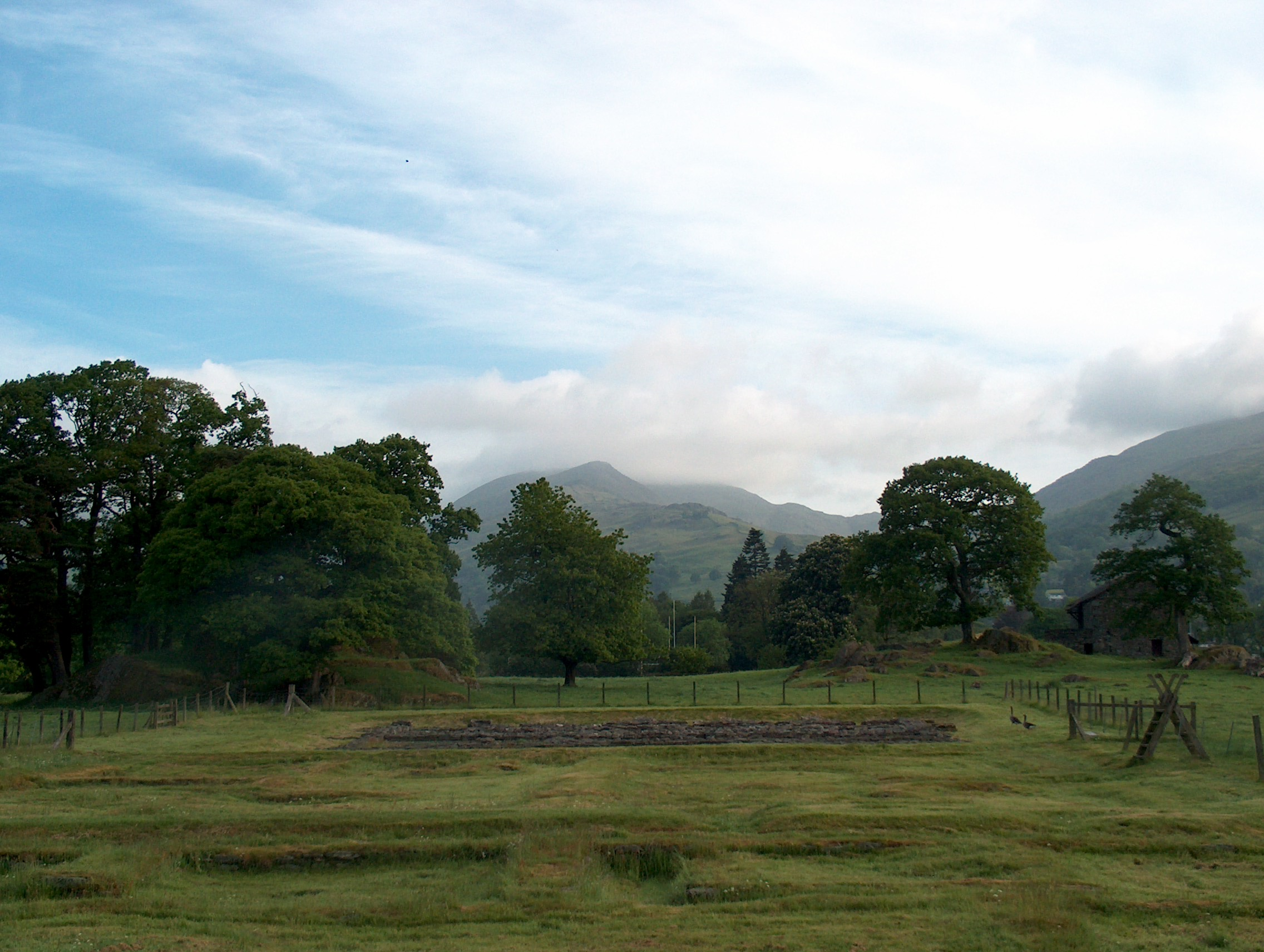
Galava Roman fort, Ambleside

Despite a more settled existence in places like Cumbria, internal strains began to affect the empire as a whole. The internal promotion reform in the army led to various people expecting promotions, which they may not have been given, and this led to tensions and violent outbreaks. Monetary inflation and splits amongst the rulers began to occur in the empire, as various pretenders vied for power in Rome, and these had deleterious effects in Britain. Rebellions in Gaul (259) and by Carausius, a naval commander who usurped power in Britain, and Allectus, who did the same (286), may have affected troops in Cumbria who were forced to take sides: a military clerk was killed at Ambleside, for example. The fight against Allectus may have led to the frontier being denuded of troops in the late 3rd century, with consequent attacks from the north. There is evidence of fire-damage at Ravenglass and other damage elsewhere in the north. The emperor Constantius I came to Britain twice to put down trouble (in 296, defeating Allectus, and in 305 fighting the Picts), and there is evidence of re-building taking place. In the early 4th century, defence-in-depth seems to have become the strategy in the frontier area, with the Wall becoming less of a 'curtain' barrier and more reliance being placed on the forts as 'strongpoints'.

The reforms of the emperors Diocletian and Constantine led to prosperity, in the south of the country at least, but this stability did not long outlast the death of Constantine in 337. The 330s and 340s saw a return to civil wars in the empire and, again, Britain was affected. It may be that the visit of the emperor Constans to Britain in 342–343 was to do with disaffection amongst British troops or "apparently to deal with problems on the northern frontier.". It is possible that the west coast of England and Wales was strengthened in a way similar to that of the southern ('Saxon Shore') defensive system. How this affected the Cumbrian coast is uncertain, but it appears that the forts at Ravenglass, Moresby, Maryport and Beckfoot were maintained and occupied, and there is evidence that some of the Hadrianic coastal fortlets and towers were re-occupied, such as at Cardurnock (milefortlet 5).

The usurpation of Magnentius and his defeat in 353 may have further increased troubles in Britannia. Attacks on the province took place in 360 and, some years later, secret agents, known as the Areani (or 'Arcani'), operating between Hadrian's Wall and the Vallum as intelligence-gatherers, were involved in the Great Conspiracy of 367–368. They were accused of going over to the enemies of the empire, such as the Picts, the Scotti (from Ireland), and the Saxons, in return for bribes and the promise of plunder.

Some of the 'outpost-forts' north of the Wall, and others such as Watercrook, seem not to have been maintained after 367, but Count Theodosius, or maybe local 'chieftains', did a fair amount of re-building and recovery work elsewhere. There is evidence of a narrowing of the gateway at Birdoswald, and structural changes at Bowness-on-Solway and Ravenglass, for example. There may also have been new fortlets at Wreay Hall and Barrock Fell, and possibly at Cummersdale, all south of Carlisle.

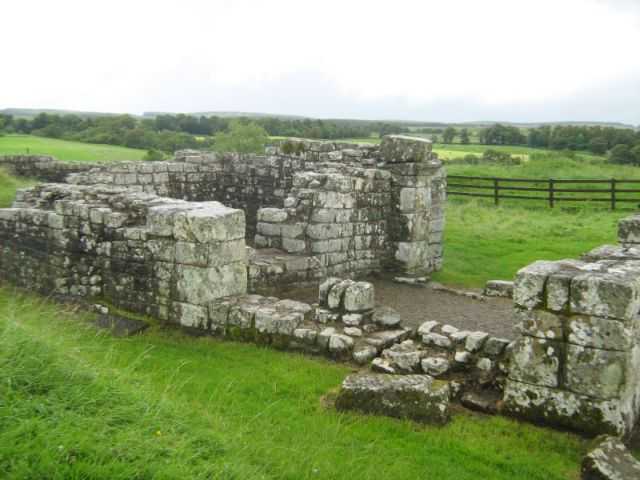
Birdoswald – showing partial blockage of main (east) gateway

After the 360s there appears to have been a 'marked decline in the occupation of vici', possibly due to the clearing out of the 'areani' by Theodosius. Also, army supplies were increasingly shipped in from imperial factories on the continent. The continuous loss of numbers of troops (drawn away to fight elsewhere), plus the ravages of inflation, meant that there was little reason left for local inhabitants of the vici to remain. The raids by the Picts and Scots in the late 4th and early 5th centuries (the so-called 'Pictish Wars'), meant increasing strain. For example, between 385 and 398 (when Stilicho cleared the raiders out), Cumbria was 'left to its own devices'.

The various phases of re-modelling of the Birdoswald fort in the second half of the 4th century suggest that it was becoming more like a local warlord's fortress than a typical Roman fort. It may be that local people were looking more to their own defence (perhaps influenced by Pelagian thought about self-salvation), as Roman authority waned (for example, taxation-gathering and payment to the troops gradually ceased). In the northern frontier area at least, it looks as though the local Roman fort commander became the local warlord, and the local troops became the local militia operating a local 'protection racket', without any direction from above. This was what Higham called a "return to tribalism", dating perhaps from as early as 350 onwards. The Roman 'abandonment' of Cumbria (and Britain as a whole) was therefore not a sudden affair, as the famous advice of Honorius in 410, supposedly to the Britons ( that is, to look to their own defence) suggests. The Romano-British, in the north at least, had been doing that for some time.

=== Life in Roman Cumbria ===
The severe lack of available evidence makes it difficult to draw a picture of what life was like in Roman Cumbria, and to what extent "Romanisation" took place (although the Vindolanda tablets give us a glimpse of Roman life on the, mostly, pre-Hadrian's Wall frontier). The auxiliary troops stationed in the forts obviously had an impact. Land around forts was appropriated for various uses – parade grounds, annexes (as at Carlisle), land given to retired troops for farming use, mining operations (copper in the Lake District, lead and silver around Alston), and so on. Around most forts, a vicus (plural, vici) – a civilian settlement – may have been established, consisting of merchants, traders, artisans, and camp-followers, drawn to the business opportunities provided by supplying the troops. The beginnings of something like town life can be seen, but probably not with the same extent of urbanisation and wealth as in the south of England.

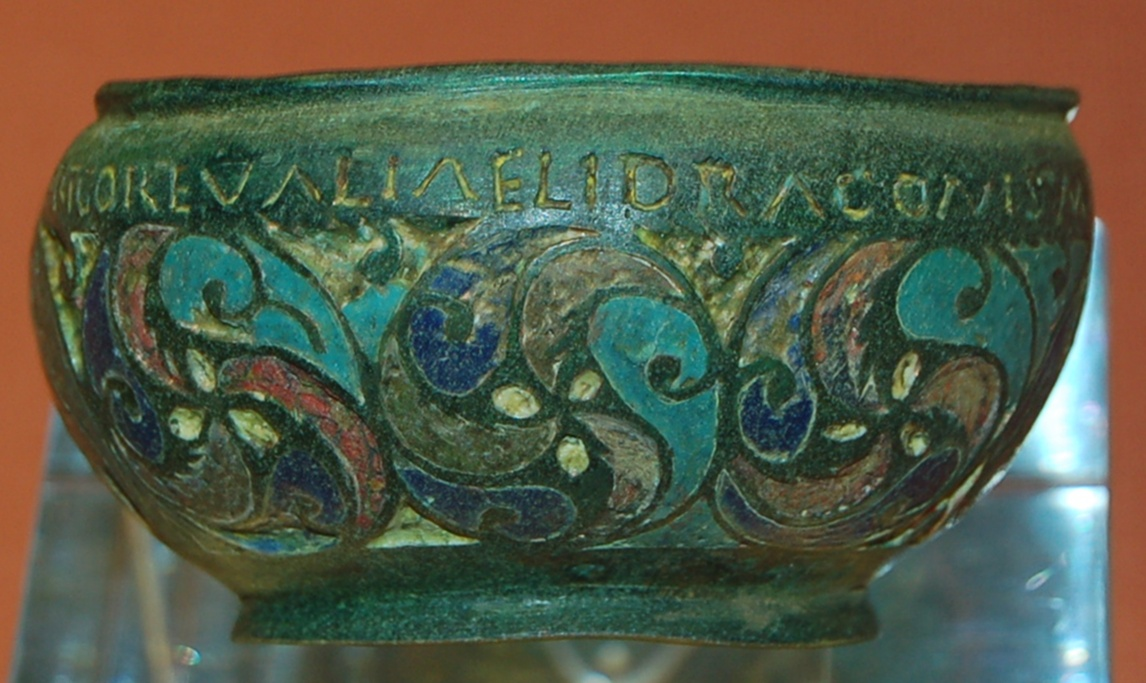
The Staffordshire Moorlands Pan – an enamelled cooking and serving vessel, engraved with the names of four Hadrian's Wall forts sited in Cumbria (2nd century AD). See also the article on the Rudge Cup and Amiens skillet.

Apart from settlements associated with the forts, Roman Cumbria consisted of scattered rural settlements, situated where good agricultural ground was to be found in the Solway Plain, the West Coastal Plain, and in the valleys of the Eden, Petteril, and Lune.

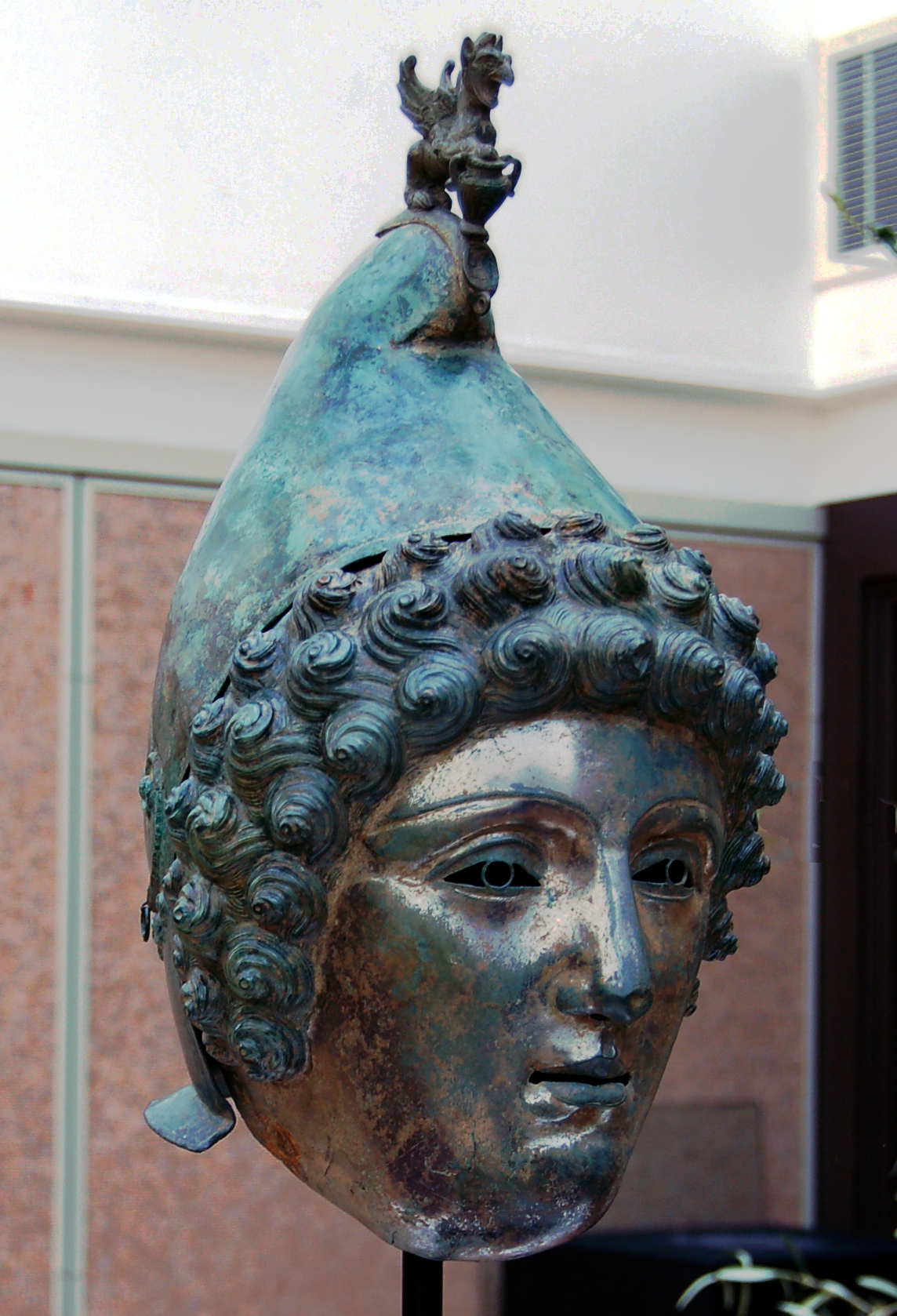
The Crosby Garrett Helmet – (private collection)

Most of the population, the total size of which at its peak has been estimated at between 20,000–30,000 people, lived in scattered, but not isolated, communities, usually consisting of just a single family group. They practised mixed agriculture, with enclosures for arable use, but also with enclosed and unenclosed pasture fields. During the second half of the Roman occupation, there seems to have been a move from agricultural land to pasture and 'waste' with building of walls and barriers – perhaps due either to a fall-off in demand for grain locally, consequent on the decline of the Roman military establishment, or to a drop in productivity.

It is difficult to assess the long-term effects of the Roman occupation on the native inhabitants of Cumbria. The evidence gleaned from artefacts such as the Staffordshire Moorlands Pan (also known as the Ilam Pan), suggests that a Romano-British adaptation of Celtic art persisted in Cumbria. One expert says that: "... Celtic tradition survived in Roman disguise ...", and that "the Romanisation of Britain was in many ways nothing but a surface veneer." (The pan was probably a souvenir of Hadrian's Wall, inscribed with the names of some of the Cumbrian forts in the 2nd century, along with the name of the owner, perhaps an ex-soldier, showing that the Wall was noteworthy enough in Roman times to be remembered.)

In a superstitious age, religion was a factor that may have helped to bridge the divide between Roman and Celtic ways of life to form a Romano-British culture. After the destruction of the Druids, there is evidence of a mixing of Roman mystery-cults with local Celtic deities, alongside formal Roman cults of the emperor and worship of the Olympian gods.

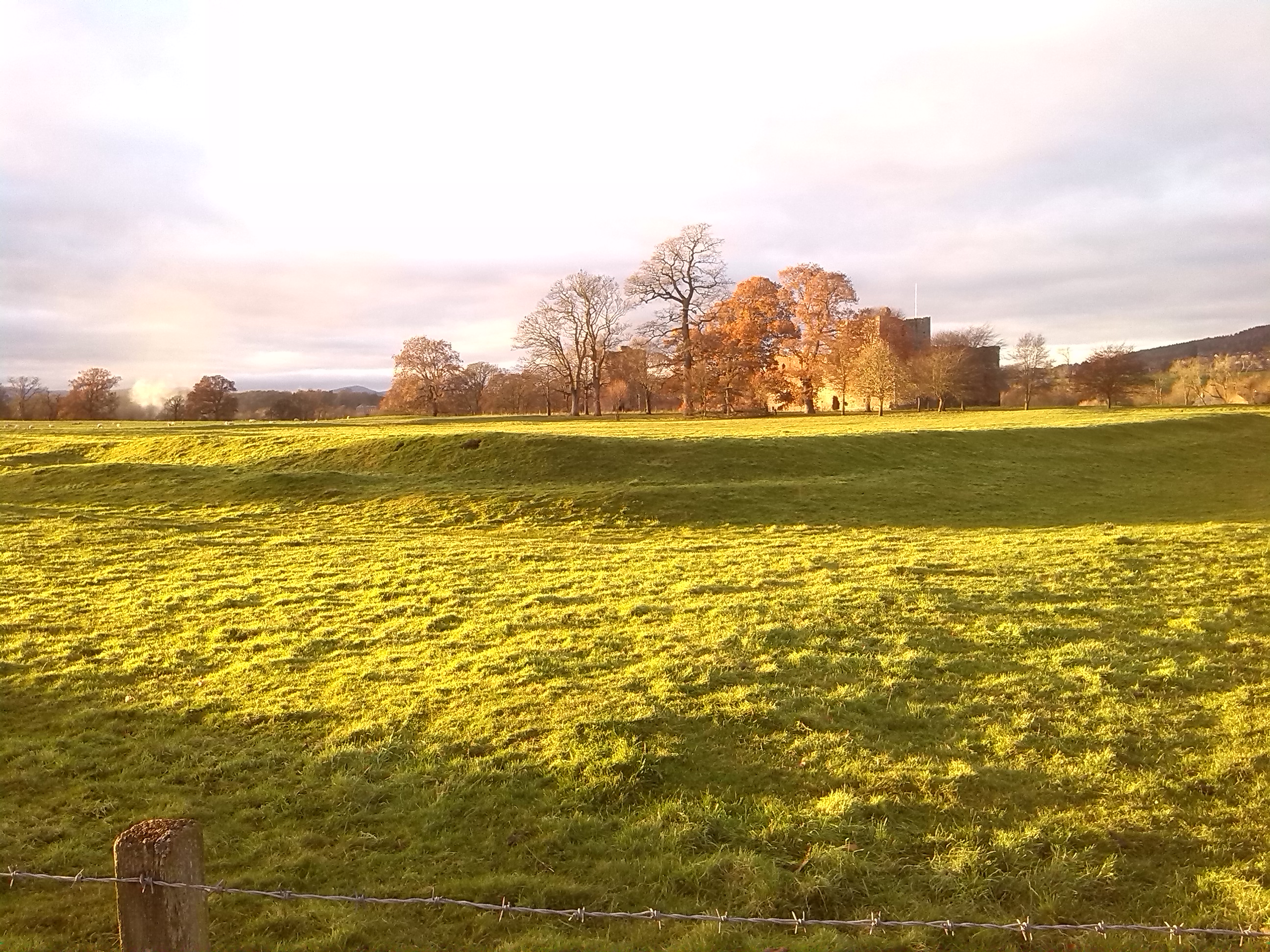
The banks of Brocavum Roman fort in the foreground; Brougham Castle is in the background

All in all, the old model of Roman 'conquerors' and local 'vanquished' in Cumbria and the north, is superseded by one that sees that, "within limits, the local population became Romanised".

== Medieval Cumbria ==
=== Early medieval Cumbria, 410–1066 ===
==== After the Romans: warring tribes and the Kingdom of Rheged, c. 410–600 ====
As outlined above, by the official Roman break with Britannia in 410, most of Britain was already effectively independent of the empire. In Cumbria, the Roman presence had been almost entirely military rather than civil, and the withdrawal is unlikely to have caused much change. The power vacuum was probably filled by local warlords and their retainers who fought it out for control over various regions, one of which may have been Rheged. However, questions remain as to what post-Roman Cumbria looked like, in terms of its political and social life.

==== Sources – history and legend ====
The questions mentioned above remain to be answered because now we enter the period that used to be called the Dark Ages, due to the lack of archaeological and paleobotanical finds, (although the last few decades have provided more in the way of archaeological evidence due to the improvement in dating, especially by means of radiocarbon analysis), and the unreliability of the documentary sources that we are forced to use as a result. Some historians, therefore, dismiss some well-known figures of the 5th and 6th centuries, potentially connected with Cumbria, as being legendary or -pseudo-historical. King Arthur, Cunedda and Coel Hen are some of these figures.

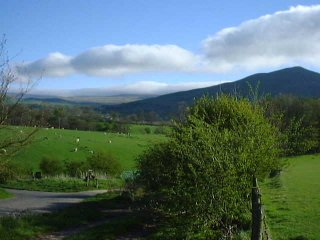
The Eden Valley between Appleby and Penrith, an area referred to affectionately as the heartland of Rheged in the praise poems of Taliesin

As far as Arthur is concerned, as with many other areas with Celtic connections, there are a number of Arthurian legends associated with Cumbria.

After the Roman withdrawal, Coel Hen may have become the High king of Northern Britain (in the same vein as the Irish Ard Rí) and ruled, supposedly, from Eboracum (now York).

==== Warring tribes ====
The successive withdrawals of Roman troops from Cumbria throughout the 4th and early 5th centuries created a power vacuum which, by necessity, was filled by local warlords and their followers, often just based around a single village or valley. The main strife of this period was created by the local 'tyrants', or warlords, fighting amongst themselves, raiding and defending themselves against raids.

Local 'kings', with successors, were continually being made and unmade in this intertribal warfare, and by the end of the 6th century some had gained a lot of power and had formed kingships over a larger area. One of these was Coroticus of Alt Clut (Strathclyde), and Pabo Post Prydain was another (he may have been based at Papcastle). Rheged seems to have been one of these members of the Old North kingdoms that emerged during this period of intertribal warfare.

==== Rheged ====
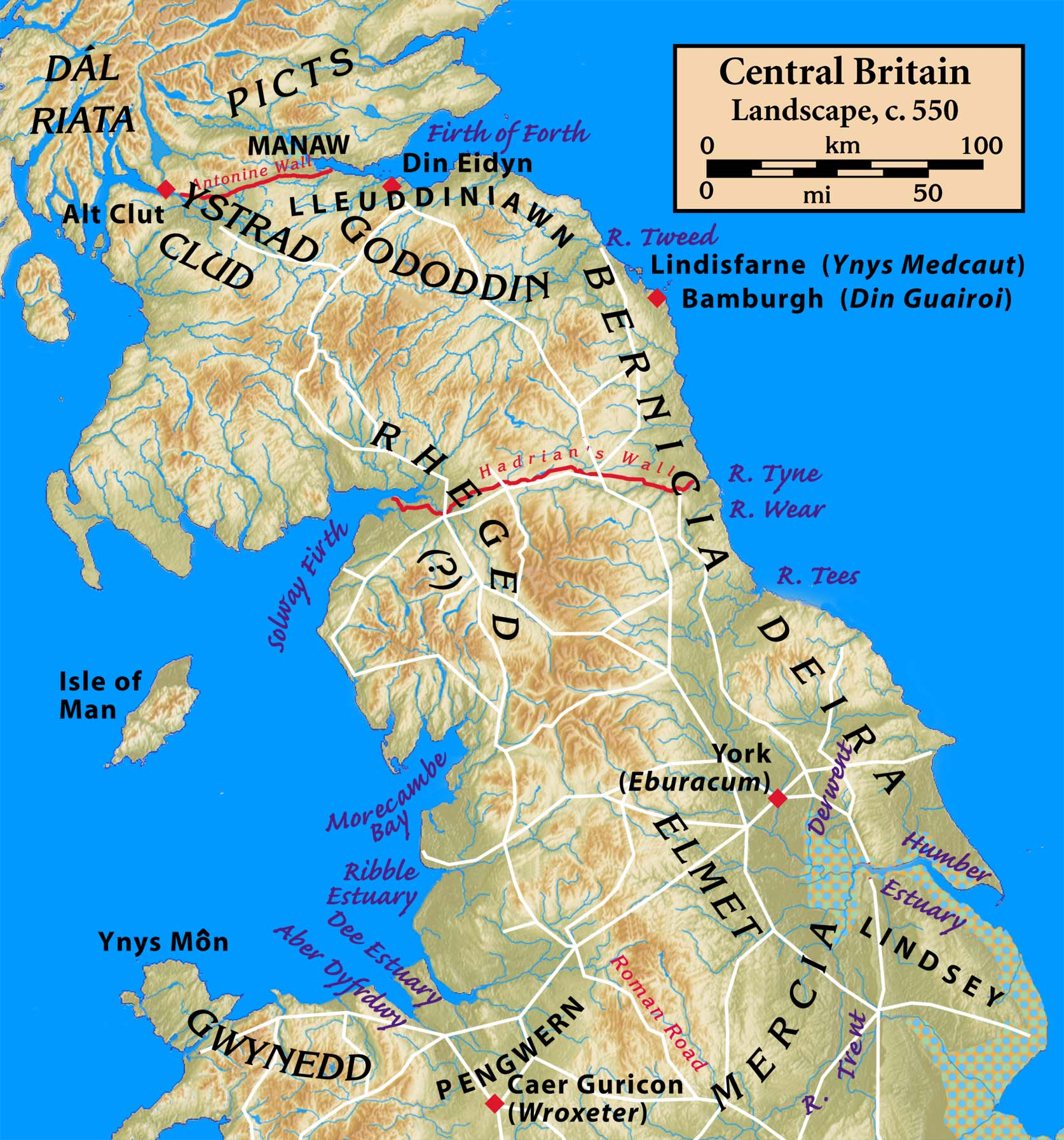
Possible position of Rheged

The extent of Rheged is disputed: none of the early sources tells us where Rheged was located. Some historians believe that it was based on the old Carvetii tribal region – mostly covering the Solway plain and the Eden valley. Others say that it may have included large parts of Dumfriesshire, Lancashire and Yorkshire. The Kingdom's centre was based, possibly, at Llwyfenydd, believed to be in the valley of the Lyvennet Beck, a tributary of the River Eden in east Cumbria, or, alternatively, at Carlisle.

The little that is known about Rheged and its kings comes from the poems of Taliesin, who was bard to Urien, King of Catraeth and of Rheged (and possibly overlord of Elmet). It is known, from the poetic sources, that under Urien's leadership the kings of the north fought against the encroaching Angles of Bernicia and that he was betrayed by one of his own allies, Morcant Bulc, who arranged his assassination after the battle of Ynys Metcaut (Lindisfarne) around 585 AD.

The Battle of Catraeth, fought by the British (c. 600 AD) to try to recover Catraeth after Urien's death, was a disastrous defeat for them. Aethelfrith, the victor, probably received tribute from the kings of Rheged, Strathclyde and Gododdin (and maybe even from the Scots of Dalriada) thereafter.

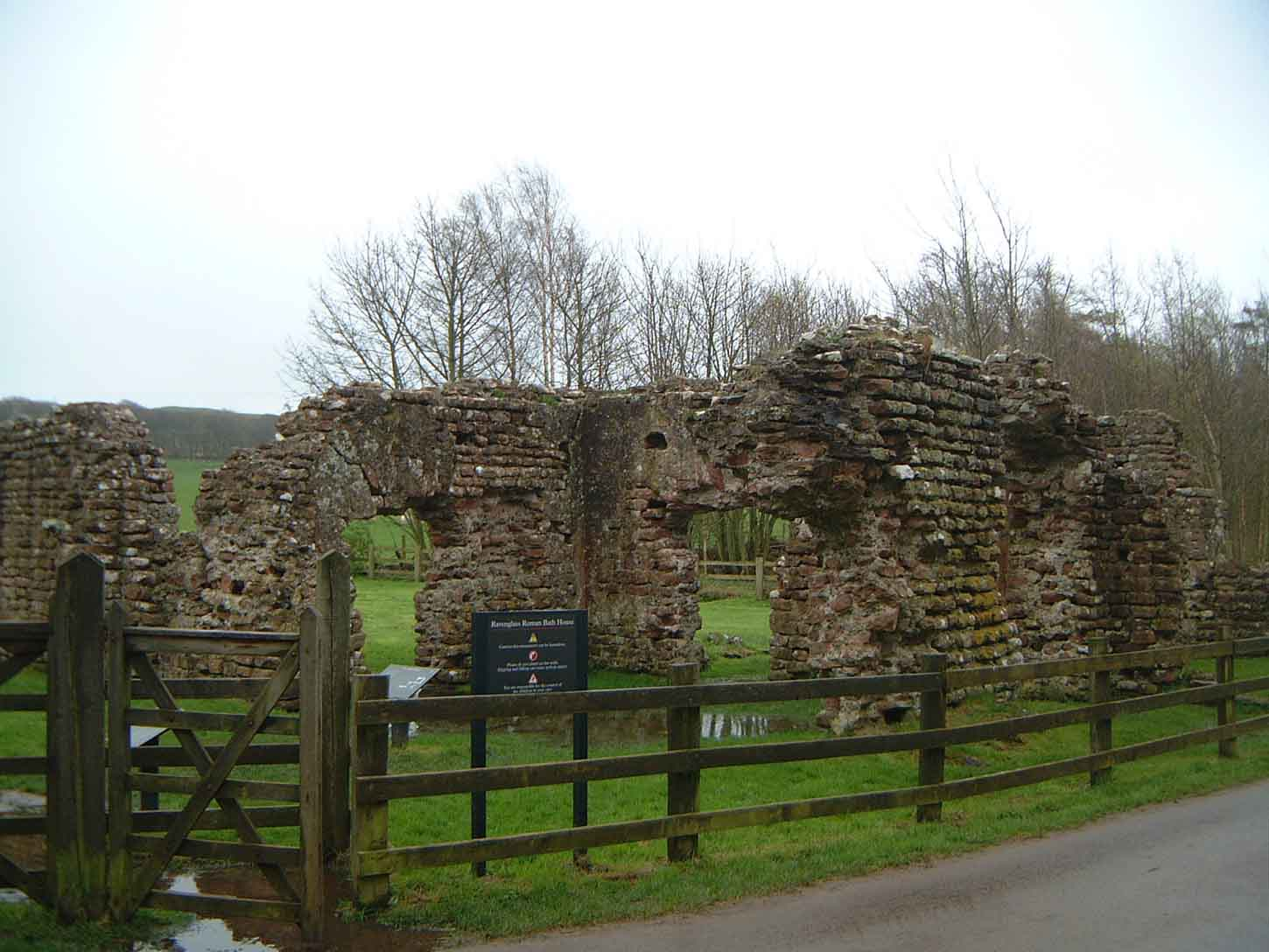
Walls Castle, Ravenglass: the possible site of the Arthurian Lyons Garde or St Patrick's birthplace

==== Christian saints ====
One aspect of the sub-Roman period in Cumbria, that is also uncertain as regards its historical evidence, is the early establishment of Christianity. A number of early 'Celtic' saints are associated with the region, including Saint Patrick, Saint Ninian and Saint Kentigern. Whether the dedications to these saints denote a continuance of a Celtic polity or populace through this period and the subsequent Anglian and Scandinavian periods, or whether they are the result of 12th-century revivals of interest in them, is unclear.

Definite evidence of 6th-century Christianity in Cumbria is hard to find – no remains of stone-built churches exist and any wooden ones have disappeared.

==== Life in early medieval Cumbria ====
Despite, or perhaps because of, the emergence of local chieftains and warbands, there are signs that the 5th and 6th centuries were not ones of economic strain in Cumbria (not more than usual, at least).

==== The Angles: Northumbrian takeover and rule, c. 600–875 ====
The 7th century saw the rise to power of the Anglo-Saxon Kingdom of Northumbria (just as the 8th saw the rise of Mercia, and the 9th that of Wessex). The Northumbrian kingdom was based on the expansionist power of Bernicia, which, by 604, had taken over their neighbouring kingdom of Deira, along with other kingdoms of the Old North such as Rheged, although the dating of the takeover, and the extent of the Anglo-Saxon settlement that followed, are a matter of contention amongst historians. Documentary and archaeological evidence is lacking and qualified reliance is placed on place-names, sculpture and blood-group studies, all of which are open to challenge.

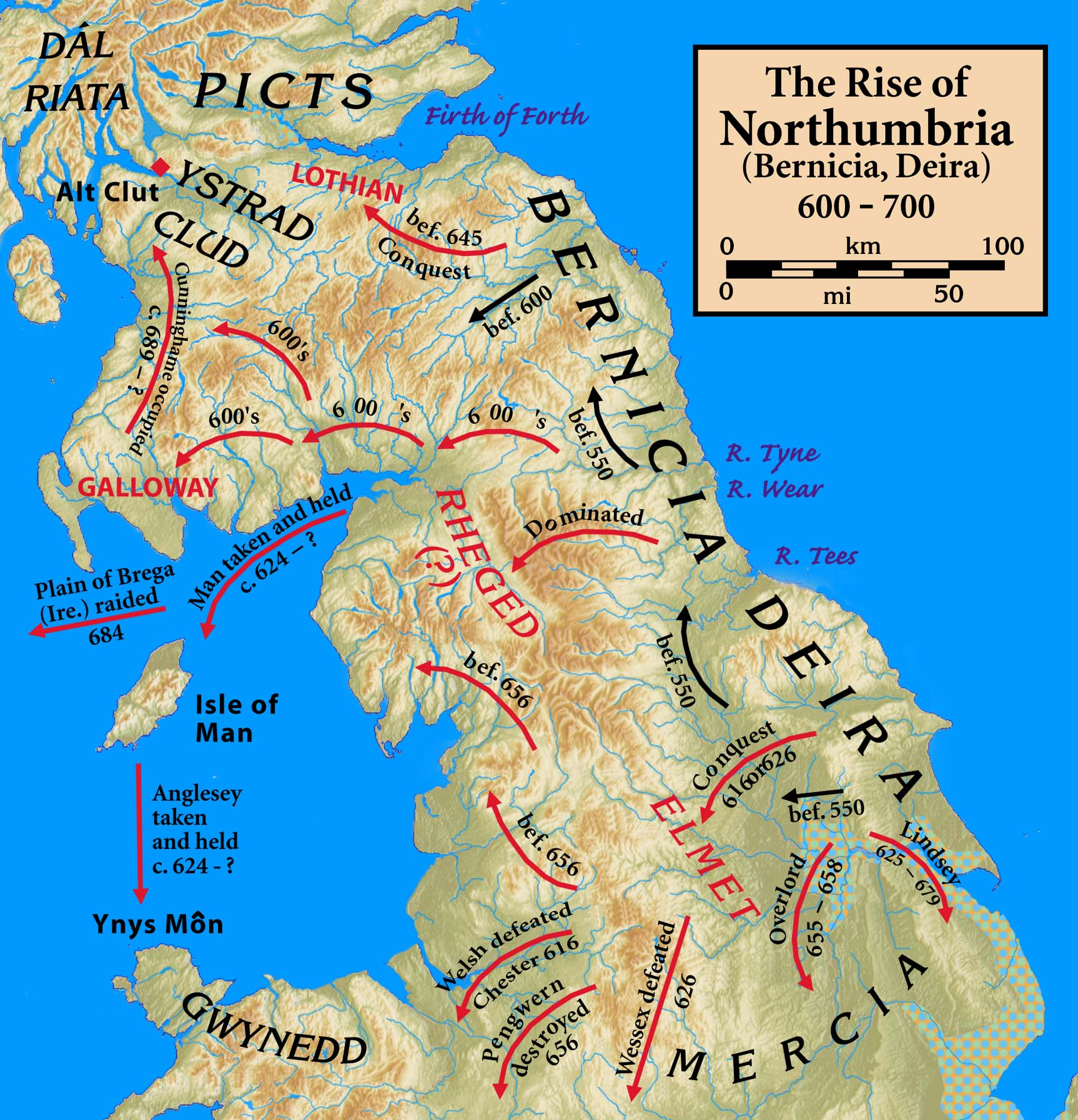

==== Takeover ====
The reign of Aethelfrith's rival, brother-in-law and successor, Edwin, saw Northumbrian power stretch as far as the 'Irish Sea Province' with the taking of the Isle of Man (c. 624) and Anglesey. How much involvement Rheged had in this move is unclear. Northumbrian ambitions were eventually checked with the disastrous defeat of King Ecgfrith's forces in 685 at the hands of the Picts at the Battle of Dun Nechtain, but the north-west region, including the Cumbria area, remained firmly within the Northumbrian ambit during this period.

Around 638 AD Oswiu, who would become the King of Northumbria after the death of Oswald, married Riemmelth (Rhiainfellt), a direct descendant of Urien Rheged and a Princess of the kingdom. This peaceable alliance between the British and English signalled the beginning of the end of formal Cumbrian independence, as Angles from the north east began to filter into the Eden Valley and along the north and south coasts of the county.

==== Anglian settlement ====
The extent of Anglian settlement of Cumbria during this period is unclear. The place-name evidence suggests that Old English (that is, Anglo-Saxon, or, in this case, Anglian) names are to be found in the lower-lying areas around the highland (modern Lake District) inner-core.

At least one historian believes that the core, strategically important, area of the Solway and the lower Eden valley, remained essentially 'Celtic', with Carlisle retaining its old Roman 'civitas' status under Northumbrian overlordship, occasionally visited by the King of Northumbria and bishops such as Cuthbert, and overseen by a 'praepositus' (English: 'reeve'), a kind of permanent official. Also, " ...many inhabitants" continued to speak Cumbric "throughout the Bernician occupation." The exceptions, more colonised by the Northumbrian English than the rest of the Cumbrian region, were perhaps the following: a) the upper Eden valley; b) the area to the east of the western edge of Bernicia; c) the Cumbrian coast, probably settled from the sea; d) the south, which may have been subject to Wilfrid's attentions, and Cartmel which was given to Cuthbert.

(Some historians, however, do not see the praepositus official as evidence of permanent, Celtic, occupation).

King Edwin, according to the Historia Brittonum, was converted to Christianity by Rhun, son of Urien, around 628. However, Bede states that Bishop Paulinus was the main force behind this. Rhun was probably present regularly at Edwin's court as a representative of Rheged. Later, the Bernician over-king, Oswiu (643–671), married twice – firstly Riemmelth of Rheged (granddaughter of Rhun), and secondly Eanflaed of Deira, thus uniting all three kingdoms. It is thus possible that a line of Anglian sub-kings ruled at Carlisle, from this time on, at least, on the strength of legal title and not just conquest.

In 670, Oswiu's son—but not by Riemmelth—Ecgfrith ascended the throne of Northumbria and it was possibly in that year that the Bewcastle Cross was erected, bearing English runes, which shows that they were certainly present in the area.). But it seems that Cumbria was little more than a province at this time and, although Anglian influences were clearly seeping in, the region remained essentially British and retained its own client-kings.

==== Church and state ====
The relation between church and state may have led to the end of Northumbrian control in the Cumbria region.

Legend has it that Cuthbert foresaw the death of Ecgfrith (at Dun Nechtain), while visiting the church at Carlisle, warning Ecgfrith's (second) wife Eormenburg whom he was accompanying. Bede reckoned that the decline of Northumbrian power dated from this year (685), but military set-backs were only part of the picture. Inter-family struggles amongst the various branches of the royal family played a part, as did the granting of royal estates (the so-called villae) to the Northumbrian Roman church (in return for support for the various attempts on the throne), encouraged by the aristocracy who wished to lessen the burden of royal power and taxation. Cuthbert's grant of lands around Cartmel was one example of this process of degradation of royal resources and power.

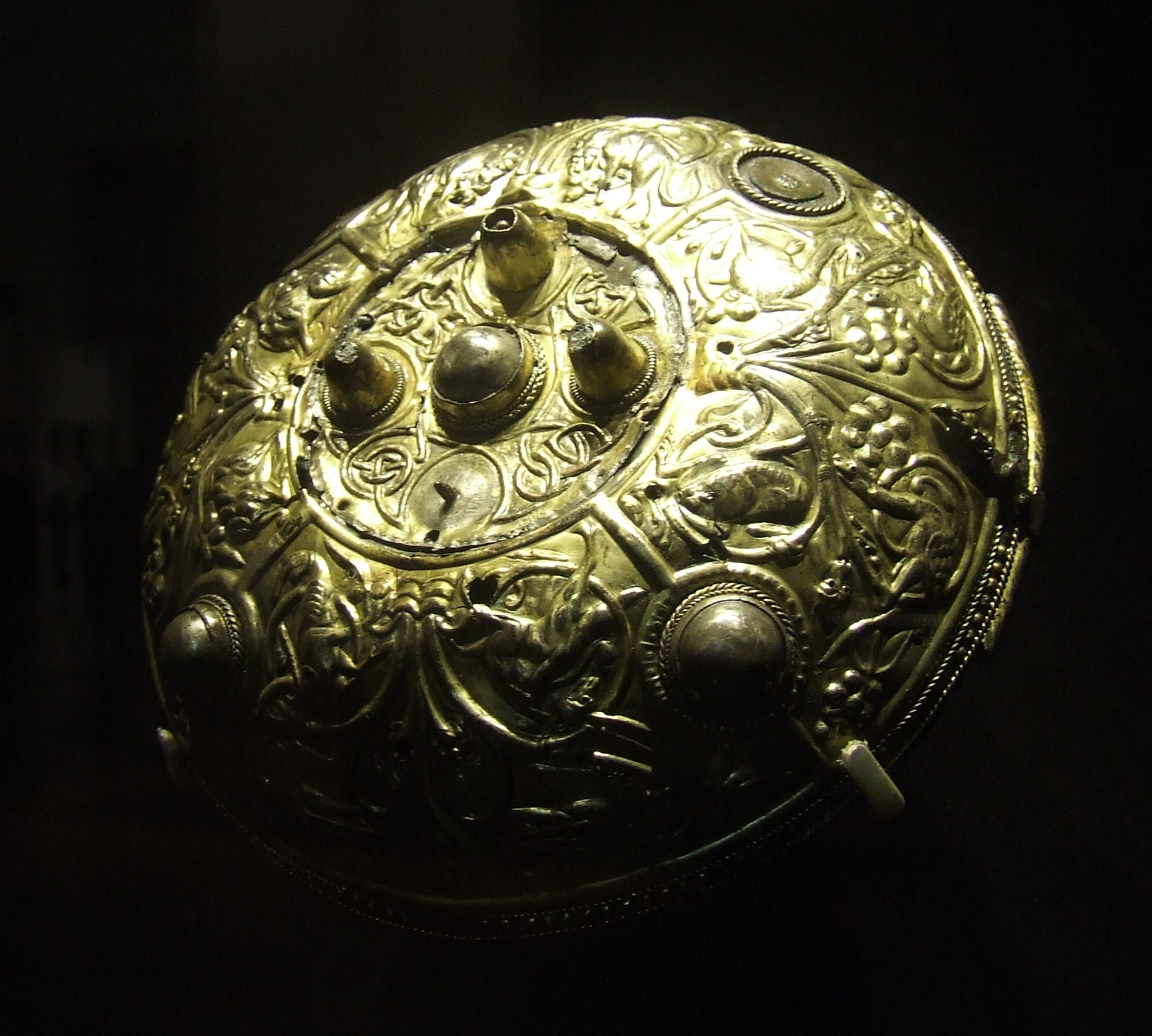
The Ormside bowl, probably late 8th century and made in Northumbria; possibly looted from York by a Viking warrior and buried with him at Great Ormside

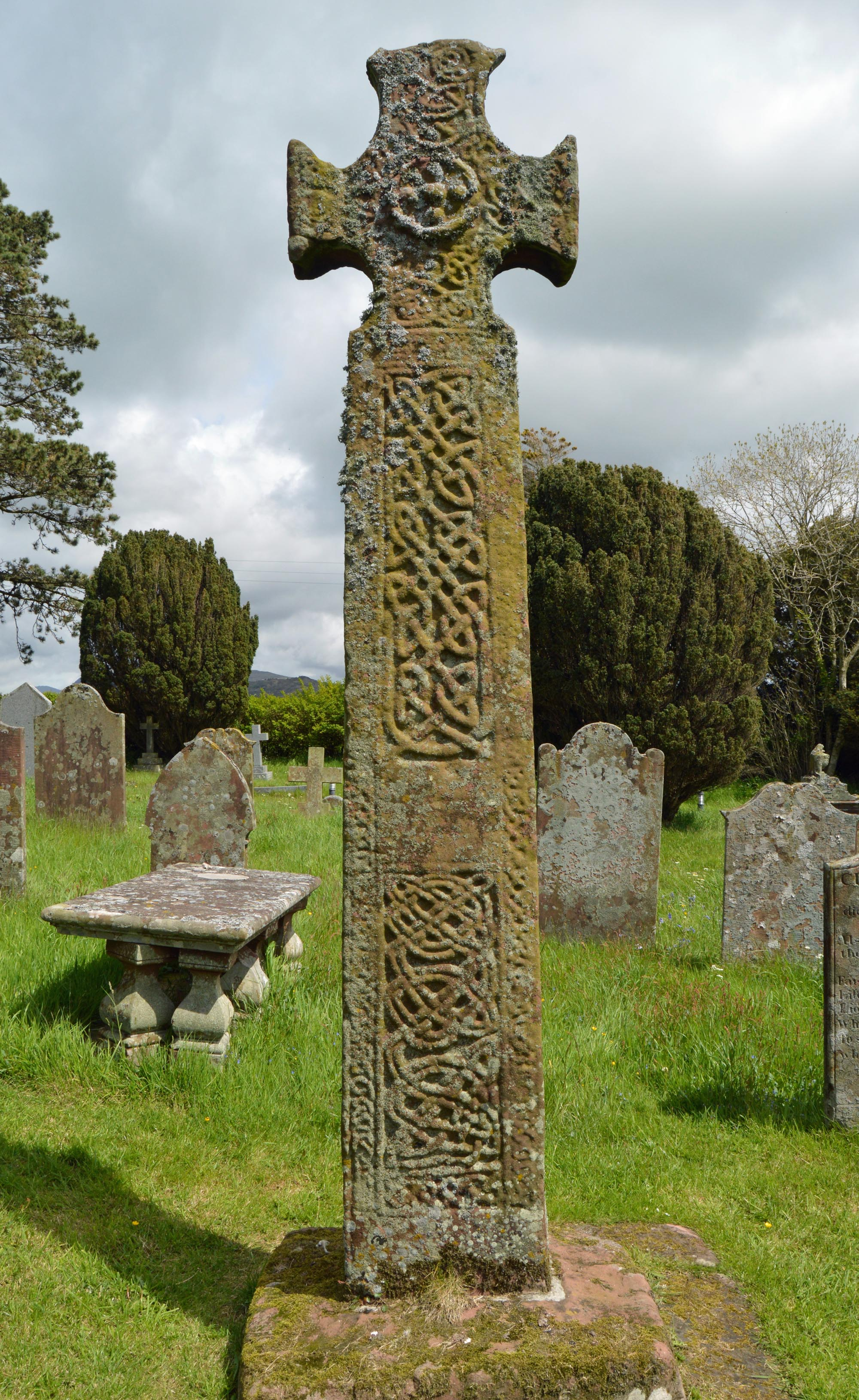
The Irton Cross, Irton, Cumbria, early 9th century, Anglian (pre-Viking) sculpture

The huge estates given to the Church meant that it became an alternative power-base to the king. In Cumbria, there were monasteries at Carlisle, Dacre, and Heversham, known from literary sources; and at Knells, Workington and Beckermet, known from stone inscriptions; and possible sites at Irton, with its early 9th-century cross, Urswick and Addingham without any evidence attached to them. Anglian sculpture was invariably to be found at monastic sites (which, in turn, were to be found in good agricultural areas). The crosses themselves were not grave markers (a few cemeteries had grave slabs), but were "memorials to the saints and to the dead."

By 875, the Northumbrian kingdom had been taken over by Danish Vikings. Cumbria was to go through a period of Irish-Scandinavian (Norse) settlement with the addition, from the late 9th century on, of the influx of more Brittonic Celts.

==== Vikings, Strathclyde British, Scots, English and 'Cumbria', 875–1066 ====
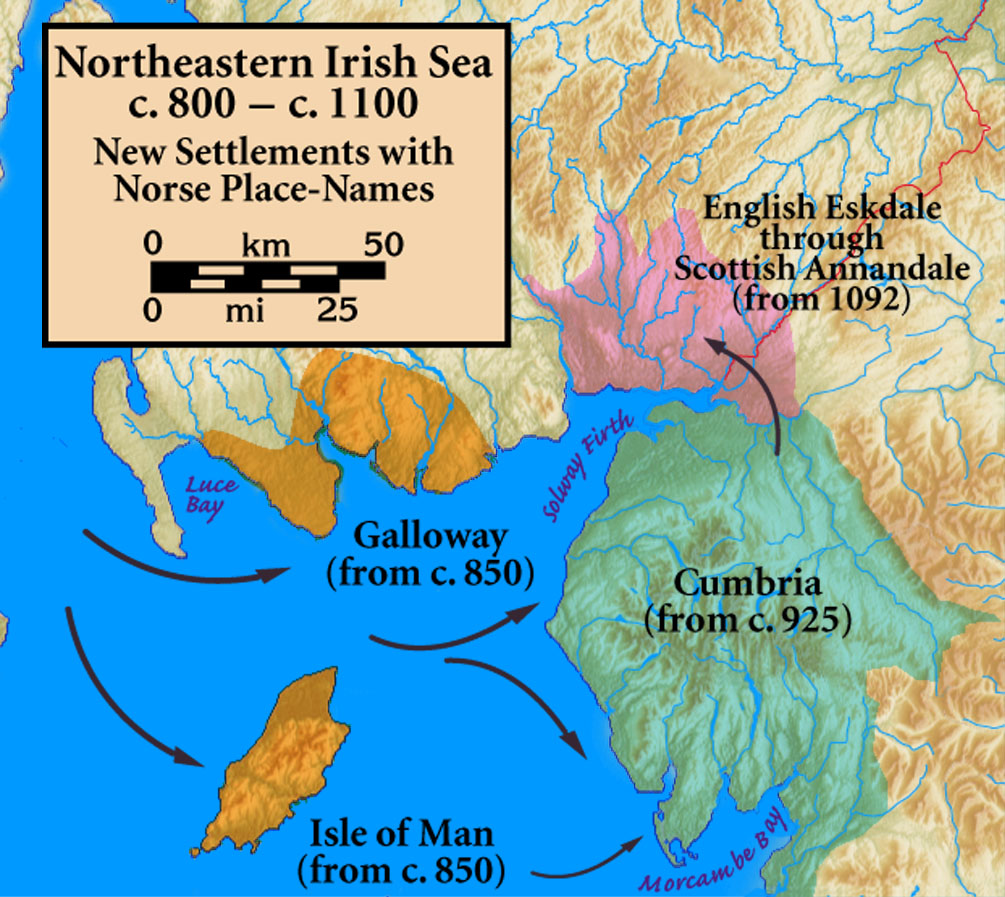
The northeastern Irish Sea, showing new settlements with Norse place names.

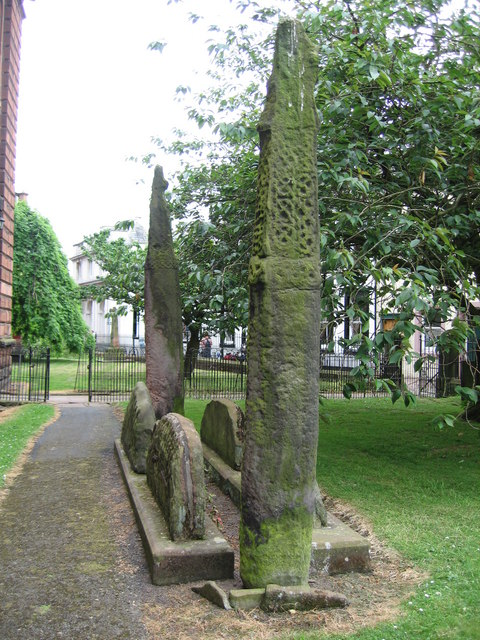
'Giants Grave', St. Andrew's churchyard, Penrith, an unusual arrangement of two Viking-age cross-shafts with four hogbacks (in the foreground). In addition, there is a smaller, Viking-age, wheel-headed cross just visible in the background

The Norse made devastating raids on the Northumbrian monasteries in the early 800s, and, by 850 had settled in the Western Isles of Scotland, in the Isle of Man, and in the east of Ireland around Dublin. They may have raided or settled in the west coast of Cumbria, although there is no literary or other evidence for this.

The collapse of Anglian authority affected what happened in Cumbria: the power vacuum was filled by the Norse, the Danes in the east, and by the Strathclyde British who themselves came under pressure from the Norse in the 870s and 890s. (The expansion of the Scots to the north and the English to the south also complicates the picture). Once again, our sources for what happened are extremely limited: the Anglo-Saxon Chronicle, for example, barely mentions the north. We are thrown back upon the study of place-names, artefacts, and stone sculptures, to fill in the picture of 10th-century Cumbria. As a result, there is some dispute amongst historians concerning the timing and the extent of the influx of Vikings and Strathclyders into Cumbria.

==== Strathclyde British settlement ====
Some historians argue that the vacuum left by the Northumbrian eclipse in Cumbria led to people from the kingdom of Strathclyde (also confusingly known at this time as 'Cumbria', the 'land of our fellow countrymen' or 'Cymry') moving into the north of what is now Cumbria. Other historians doubt this scenario, and see the situation as more of a Celtic 'survival' through the 200 years of Anglian Northumbrian rule, rather than a 'revival' based on "a wholly hypothetical process of later re-colonization" by Strathclyders in the 10th century. The bulk of what was to become Cumbria, south of the Eamont, seems to have been untouched by this movement of Brittonic peoples, although a case has been made that all of what was Cumberland, plus Low Furness and part of Cartmel, was under the control, directly or indirectly, of Strathclyde/Cumbria.

It is thought possible that this settlement of fellow Christians was encouraged by the Anglo-Celtic aristocracy, probably with the support of the English south of the Cumbrian region, as a counterweight against the Hiberno-Norse. It may be that, up to around 927, an alliance of Scots, British, Bernicians and Mercians fought against the Norse, who were themselves allied to their fellow Vikings based in York.

This situation altered with the coming of Athelstan to power in England in 927. On 12 July 927, Eamont Bridge (and/or possibly the monastery at Dacre, Cumbria, and/or the site of the old Roman fort at Brougham) was the scene of a gathering of kings from throughout Britain as recorded in the Anglo-Saxon Chronicle and the histories of William of Malmesbury and John of Worcester. Present were: Athelstan; Constantín mac Áeda (Constantine II), King of Scots; Owain of Strathclyde, King of the Cumbrians; Hywel Dda, King of Wales; and Ealdred son of Eadulf, Lord of Bamburgh. Athelstan took the submission of some of these other kings, presumably to form some sort of coalition against the Vikings. The growing power of the Scots and perhaps also of the Strathclyders, may have persuaded Athelstan to move north and attempt to define the boundaries of the various kingdoms. This is generally seen as the date of the foundation of the Kingdom of England, the northern boundary of which was the Eamont river (with Westmorland being outside the control of Strathclyde).

However, given the increasing threat from English power, it seems that Strathclyde/Cumbria switched sides and joined with the Dublin Norse to fight the English king who was now in control of Danish Northumbria and presenting a threat to the flank of Cumbrian territory. After the Battle of Brunanburh in 937, (an English victory over the combined Scots, Strathclyders and Hiberno-Norse), Athelstan came to an accommodation with the Scots. During this time, Scandinavian settlement may have been encouraged by the Strathclyde overlords in those areas of Cumbria not already taken by the Anglo-Celtic aristocracy and people.

In 945 Athelstan's successor, Edmund I, invaded Cumbria. The Anglo-Saxon Chronicle records the defeat of the Cumbrians and the harrying of Cumbria (referring not just to the English county of Cumberland but also all the Cumbrian lands up to Glasgow). Edmund's victory was against the last Cumbrian king, known as Dunmail (possibly Dyfnwal III of Strathclyde), and, following the defeat, the area was ceded to Malcolm I, King of Scots, although it is probable that the southernmost areas around Furness, Cartmel and Kendal remained under English control.

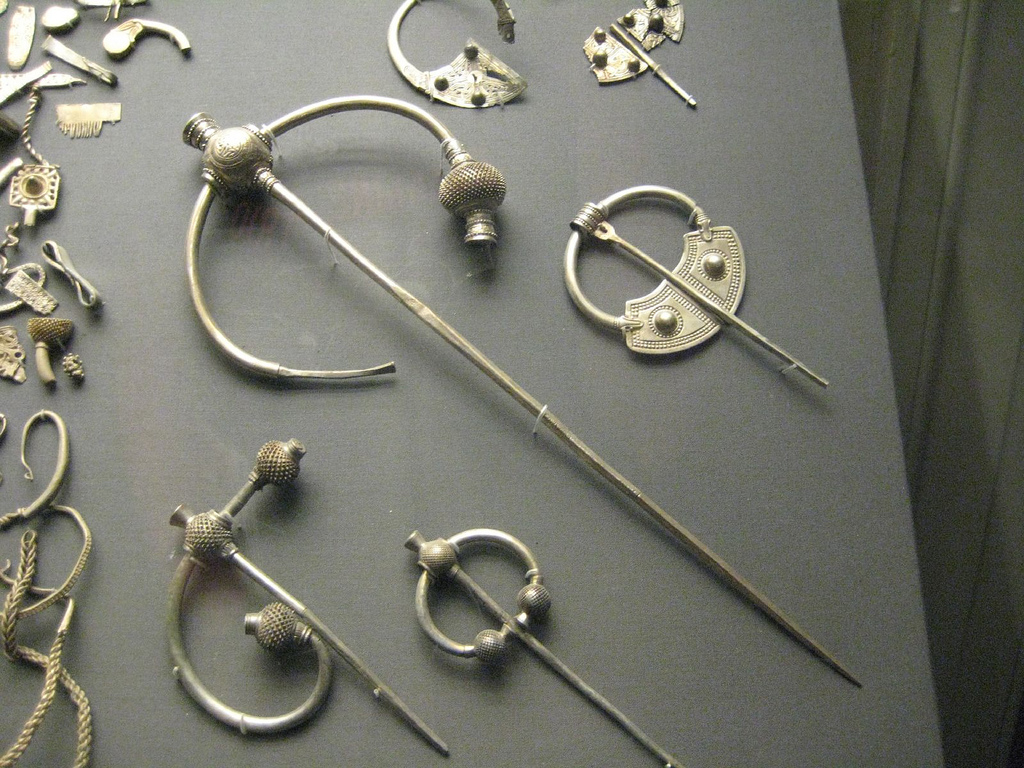
Fibulae from the Penrith Hoard, 10th century (British Museum)

==== Scandinavian settlement ====
Place-name and sculptured stone evidence suggests to one historian that the main Scandinavian colonisation took place on the west coastal plain and in north Westmorland, where some of the better farming land was occupied. The warriors who settled here encouraged stone sculptures to be made. However, the local Anglian peasantry seems to have survived in these areas as well. Some, less successful, occupation of other lowland areas took place, along with, thirdly, occupation of 'waste' land in the lowland and upland areas. This occupation in the less-good farming areas led to place-names in -ǣrgi, -thveit,, -bekkr and -fell, although many of these may have been introduced into the local dialect a long time after the Viking age. "Southern Cumbria", including the future Furness region (Lonsdale Hundred) as well as Amounderness in Lancashire, was also "entensively colonized".

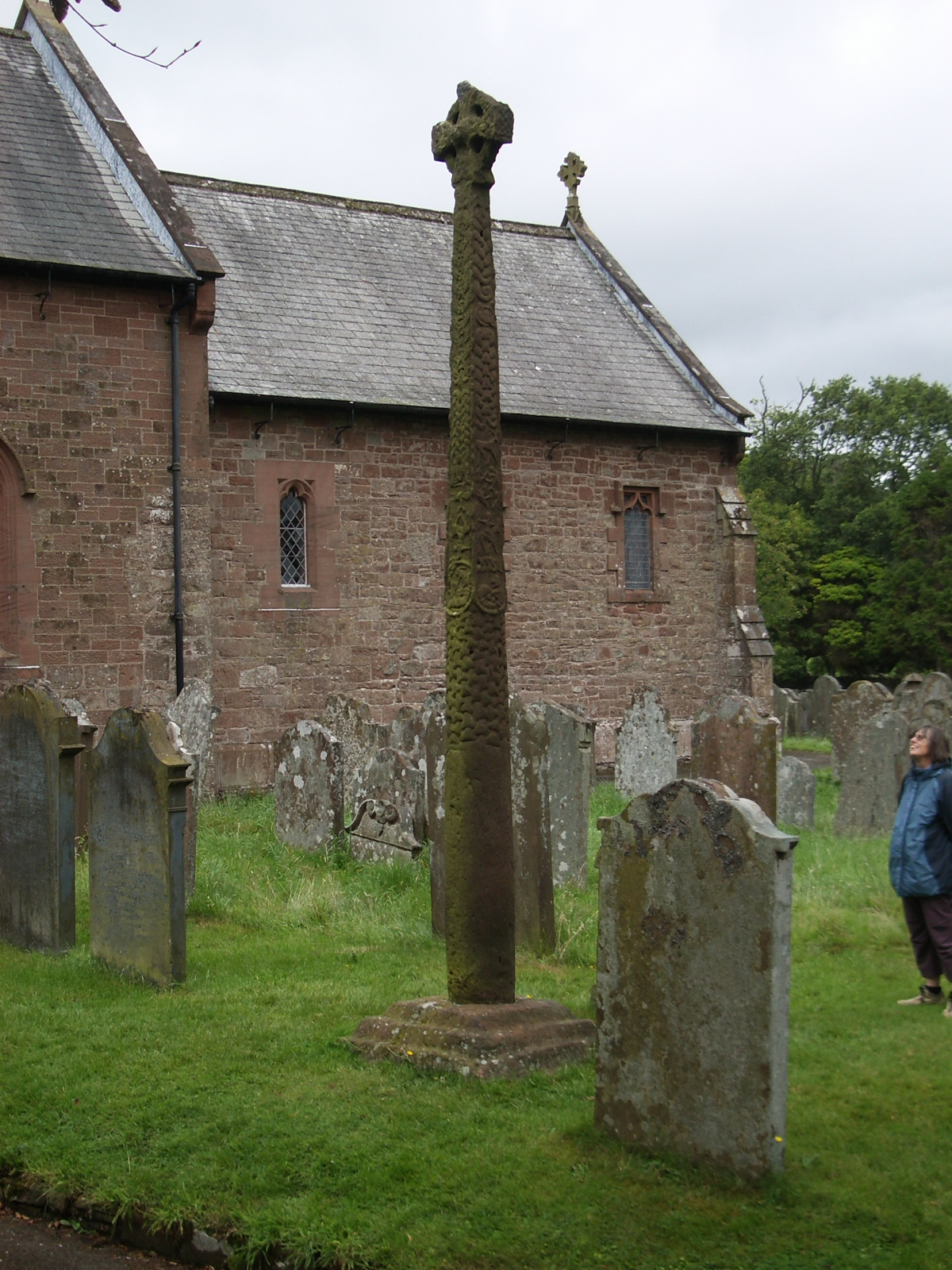
The Gosforth Cross, 10th-century Viking-age sculpture. (A replica of 1887, with clearer depictions of the decoration, may be found in the churchyard at Aspatria, along with a replica of another cross, the original of which is at Dearham)

The occupation was likely to have been largely by the Norse between about 900 and 950, but it is unclear whether they were from Ireland, the Western Isles, the Isle of Man, Galloway, or even Norway itself. Just how peaceful, or otherwise, the Scandinavian settlement was remains an open question. It has been suggested that, between c. 850 and 940, the Scots on the one hand, and the Norse of the Hebrides and Dublin on the other, were in collusion as regards what seems to have been peaceful Gaelic-Norse settlement in west Cumbria. It has also been suggested that the Hiberno-Norse in Dublin were prompted to colonise the Cumbrian coast after being temporarily expelled from the city in 902. The successful attempt by Ragnall ua Ímair to conquer the Danes in York (around 920) must have led to the Dublin – York route through Cumbria being frequently used. In Westmorland, it is likely that much colonisation came from Danish Yorkshire, as evidenced by place-names ending in -by in the upper-Eden valley region (around Appleby), especially after the eclipse of Danish power in York in 954 (the year of the death of the Norse King of York, Erik Bloodaxe, on Stainmore).

There was no integrated and organised 'Viking' community in Cumbria – it seems to have been more a case of small groups taking over unoccupied land. (However, others argue that the place-name evidence points to the Scandinavians not just accepting the second-best land, but taking over Anglian vills as well.)

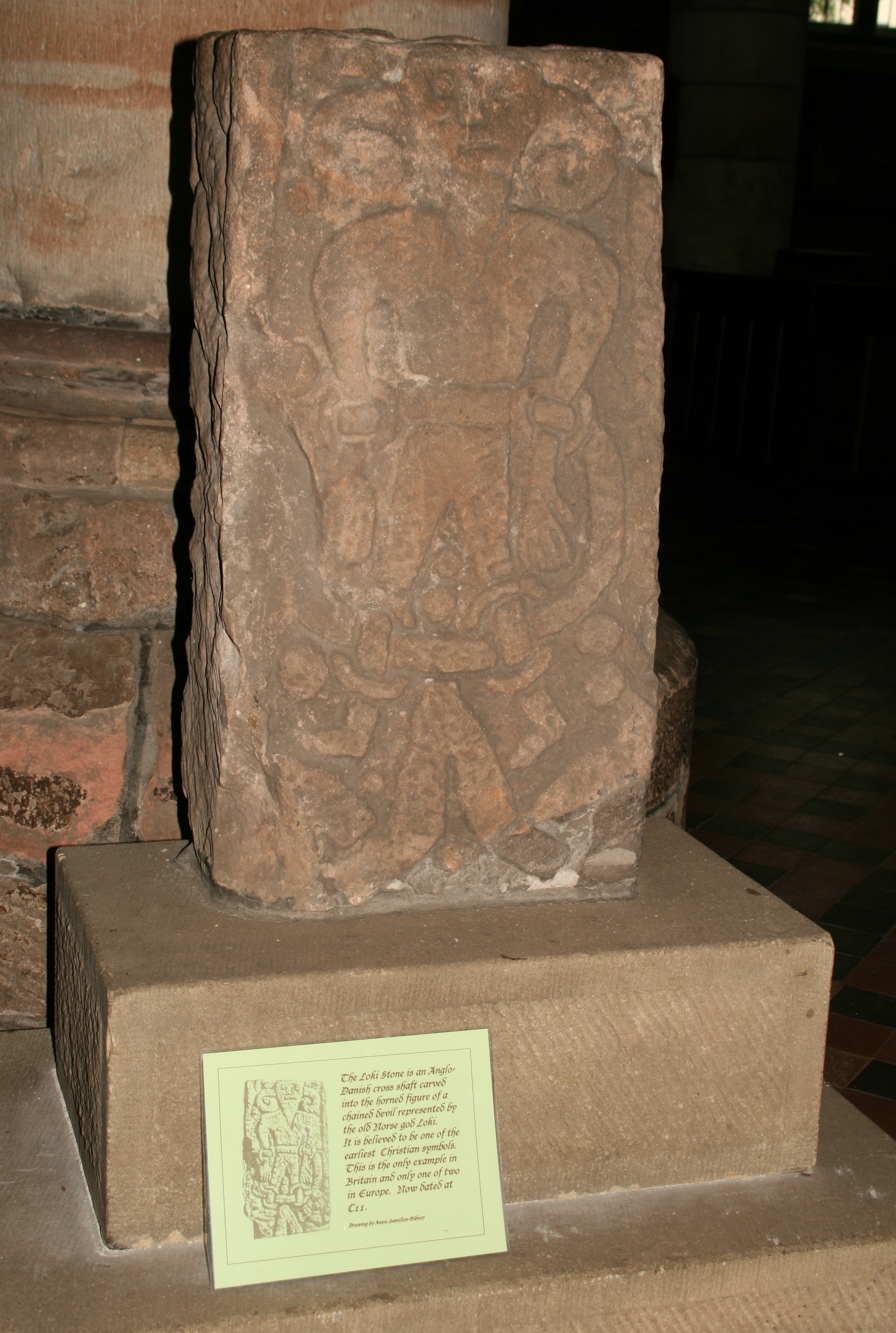
Loki stone, Kirkby Stephen parish church, part of a 10th-century Viking-age cross-shaft. But does it show Loki or Satan?

The evidence of the sculpture is unclear when it comes to influences. Although called by some 'pagan' or 'Viking', it may be that some, if not most, of the crosses and hogback sculpture (to be found almost wholly in south Cumbria, away from the Strathclyde area), such as the Gosforth Cross and the Penrith 'Giant's Grave', reflect secular or early Christian concerns, rather than pagan ones.

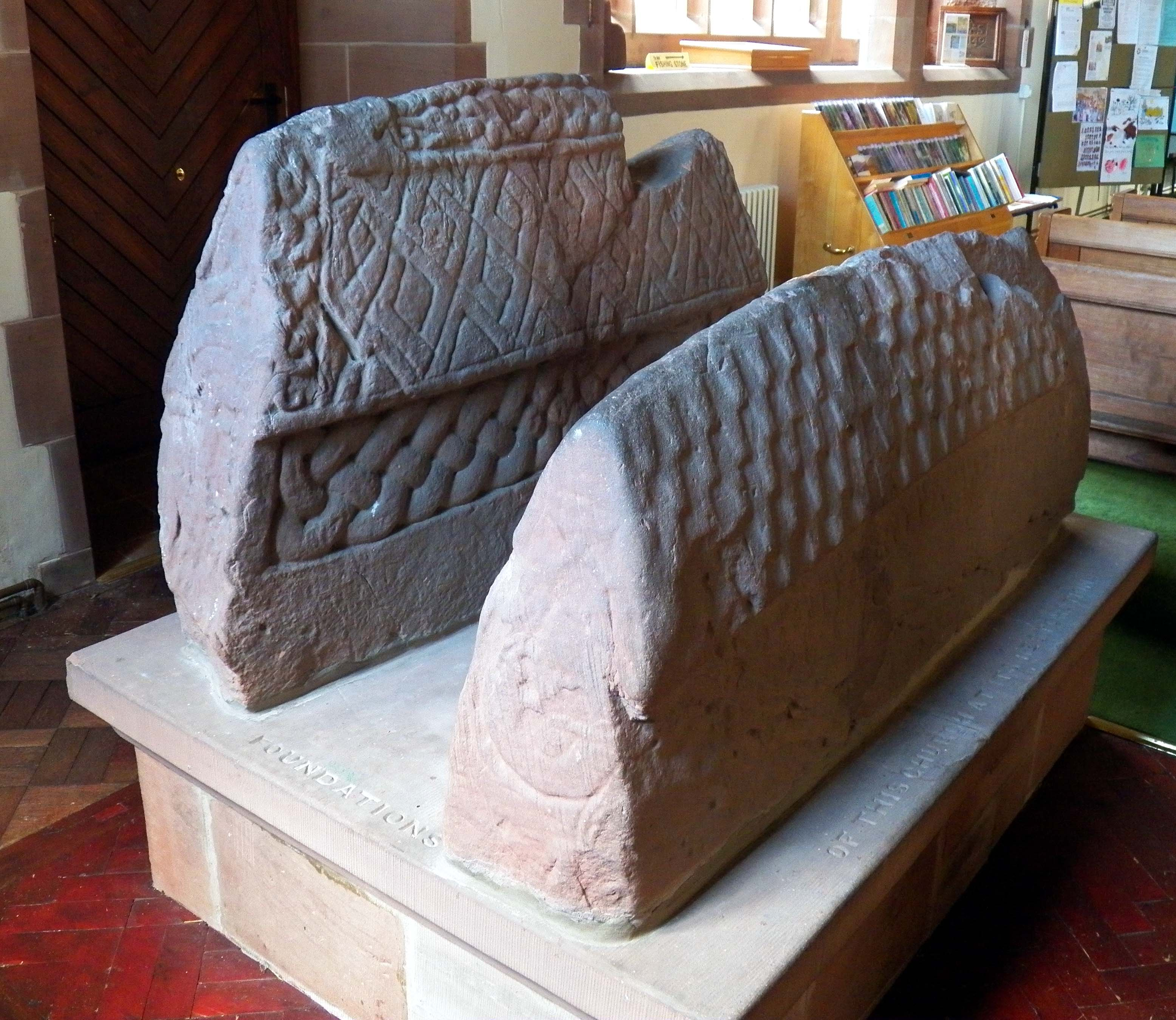
So-called "Saint's tomb" (left), and "Warrior's tomb" (right), two hogbacks in St. Mary's church, Gosforth. Typically high and narrow Cumbrian style, in the shape of a building with a roof, eaves and walls. The Saint's tomb has a crucifixion on the end, the Warrior's tomb has a procession of armed men

As an example of Viking relics, a hoard of Viking coins and silver objects was discovered in the Eden valley at Penrith. Also in the Eden valley were finds at Hesket and at Ormside, which has been mentioned above as the site of a possible Viking grave-good. The other areas of Viking finds include Carlisle (west of the Cathedral), pagan graves at Cumwhitton and finds in the Lune valley and on the west coast (for example, Aspatria and St. Michael's Church, Workington).

==== The Scots and 'Cumbria' ====
One historian has suggested that the notion of 'Strathclyde/Cumbria' presents too much of a picture of Strathclyde dominating the relationship, and that maybe the Cumbrian area – including the Solway basin and perhaps lands in Galloway, but also specifically the area that became Cumberland county later (the so-called 'Cumbra-land') – was where the prosperity and action lay. It is even suggested that there were two kingships, one of the Clyde area (effectively 'annexed' by Donald II of Scotland in the late 9th century) and another of the Cumbrian (as defined above), the latter having, through marriage or by patronage, increasingly Scottish input. Much of this interpretation rests on the writings of John Fordun and has been challenged by other historians.

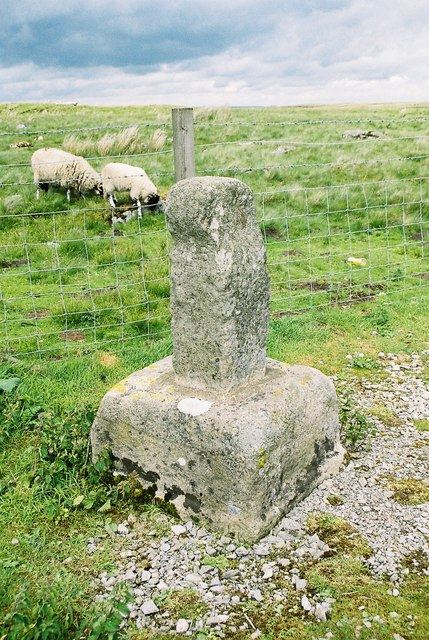
The Rere or Rey Cross on Stainmore

Whatever the background, from c. 941, it has been suggested, Cumbrian/Scottish rule may have lasted around 115 years, with territory extending to Dunmail Raise (or 'cairn') in the south of the Cumbrian region (and perhaps Dunmail was trying to extend it through 'Westmoringa land', the future Westmorland, when he incurred the wrath of Edmund I, who regarded the area as English, in 945 ). Edmund, having ravaged Strathclyde/Cumbria, ceded it to the King of Scots, Malcolm I of Scotland, either to define the limits of English rule in the North-West, and/or to secure a treaty with the Scots to prevent them joining up with the Norse and Danes of Dublin and York.

In 971, Kenneth II of Scotland raided 'Westmoringa land', presumably trying to extend the Cumbrian frontier to Stainmore and the Rere Cross. In 973, Kenneth and Máel Coluim I of Strathclyde obtained recognition of this enlarged Cumbria from the English king Edgar. 'Westmoringa land' thus became a buffer zone between the Cumbrian/Scots and the English.

==== The English and Cumbria ====
In 1000, the English king, Ethelred the Unready, taking advantage of a temporary absence of the Danes in southern England, invaded Strathclyde/Cumbria for reasons unknown. After the takeover of the English throne by Cnut in 1015/16, the northern region became more disturbed than ever, with the fall of the Bamburgh earls and the defeat of the Northumbrian earl by the Scots and Cumbrians at the Battle of Carham in 1018.

Attempts by the Scots and Cnut to control the area ended with Siward, Earl of Northumbria emerging as a strongman. He was a Dane, becoming Cnut's right-hand man in the north by 1033 (Earl of Yorkshire, around 1033; and also Earl of Northumbria, around 1042). Sometime between 1042 and 1055, Siward seems to have taken control of Cumbria south of the Solway, perhaps responding to pressure from the independent lords of Galloway or from Strathclyde or perhaps taking advantage of Scottish troubles to do with the reign of Macbeth, King of Scotland. The routes through the Tyne Gap and also via the Eden Valley over Stainmore threatened to allow the Scots overlords of Strathclyde/Cumbria to raid Northumbria and Yorkshire respectively (although most Scots' raids took place by crossing the River Tweed into Lothian in the east).

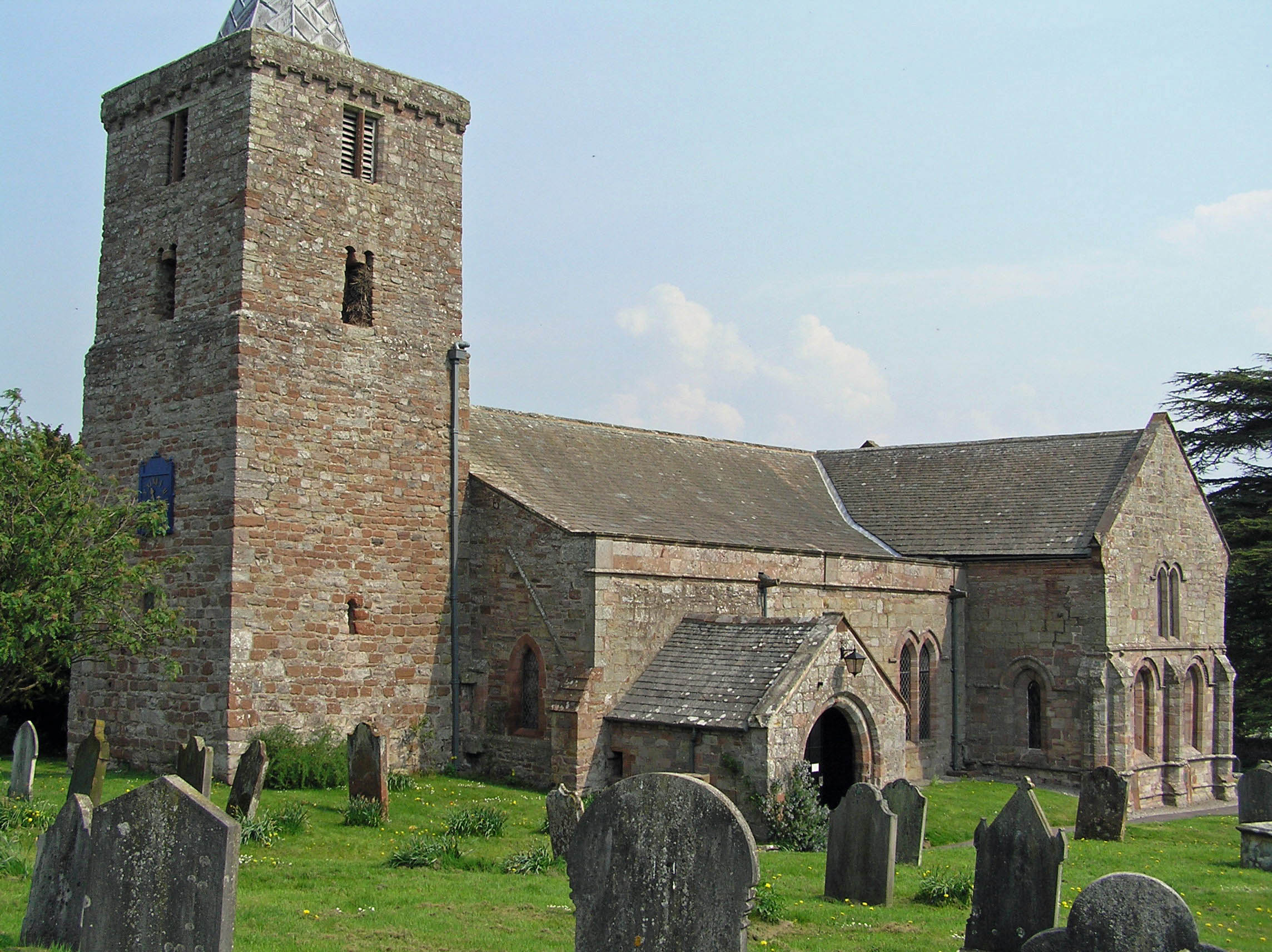
St Laurence's Church, Morland : with "the only tower of Anglo-Saxon character in the NW counties", according to Pevsner. Tower possibly built by order of Siward, Earl of Northumbria, sometime between 1042 and 1055; nave possibly later (1120)

Some evidence comes from a document known to historians as "Gospatric's Writ", one of the earliest documents to do with Cumbrian history.

Siward aided his kinsman Malcolm III of Scotland, possibly known as 'the King of the Cumbrians' (but possibly confused with Owen the Bald of Strathclyde) at the Battle of Dunsinane in 1054, against Macbeth who, although escaping, was eventually killed in 1057. Despite this receipt of help, Malcolm invaded Northumbria in 1061, possibly trying to enforce his claim as 'King of the Cumbrians', (that is, to regain the lost territory of Cumbria south of the Solway taken by Siward), whilst Siward's successor as earl, Tostig Godwinson, was away on pilgrimage. It is likely that Malcolm succeeded in regaining the Cumberland part of Cumbria in 1061: in 1070 he used Cumberland as his base to attack Yorkshire. This 1061 incursion was the first of five such raids by Malcolm, a policy that alienated the English Northumbrians and made it harder to fight the Normans after the invasion of 1066. For the next thirty years, Cumbria, probably down to the Rere Cross boundary, was in the hands of the Scots.

Malcolm III, King of Scots, held the Cumberland territory, (probably down to the River Derwent, River Eamont and Rere Cross on Stainmore line), until 1092, one year before his death in battle. The fact that he did this without challenge was partly the result, as far as the pre-Norman conquest era is concerned, of turmoil and alienation amongst the Northumbrian and Yorkshire nobles, (drawn from the ranks of the old Anglo-Saxon Bamburgh royal family and Danish/Norse nobles respectively), as well as the disaffection of the St. Cuthbert monks (in Durham), due to the rule of the West Saxon outsider Earl Tostig. Other factors include the absentee nature of Tostig's rule in the North, and his friendship with King Malcolm.

=== High medieval Cumbria, 1066–1272 ===
==== Norman Cumbria: William I, William 'Rufus', Henry I, and David I, 1066–1153 ====
The Norman takeover of the Cumbria region took place in two phases: the southern district, covering what were to become the baronies of Millom, Furness, Kendale and Lonsdale, were taken over in 1066 (see below under "Domesday"); the northern sector (the "land of Carlisle") was taken over in 1092 by William Rufus.

==== William I ====
The Norman conquest of England proceeded only slowly in the North of the country, perhaps due to the relative poverty of the land (for example, not suitable for growing the Normans' preferred wheat, as opposed to oats), and to various uprisings in England as well as in Normandy that meant that William I had to be elsewhere.

The various raids by Malcolm III of Scotland, the Danes and the English rebels, plus regular uprisings by Northumbrian nobles, all contributed to the weakness of William's control of the North. Most of Cumbria therefore remained in the hands of the Scots, as well as being a base for brigands and dispossessed rebels. Cumbria south of the mountains, the future Westmorland south of the Eamont, and North Lancashire, had been held by Tostig in 1065, during which time he had battled against both the Scots and bands of brigands. It is likely that this situation persisted for much of William's reign as well.

William finally brought Northumbria under control: his son, Robert Curthose, building the castle at Newcastle upon Tyne in 1080. Robert de Mowbray's appointment as Earl of Northumbria in 1086, and the building of "castleries" (territories administered by a constable from a castle) in Yorkshire, helped to clear up the brigandage problem.

==== Domesday ====
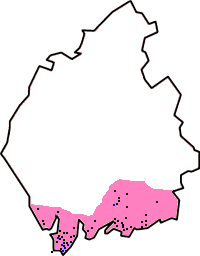
Approximate extent of Domesday coverage : the district of Hougun, if indeed it was a district, may have covered the three peninsulas at the left of the pink area

When the Normans conquered England in 1066, much of Cumbria was a no-man's-land between England and Scotland which meant that the land was not of great value. Secondly, when the Domesday Book was compiled (1086), Cumbria had not been conquered by the Normans. Only the southern part of the county, (the Millom, Furness, and part, or all, of Cartmel peninsulas), known as the Manor of Hougun, that which included lands held by Earl Tostig, was included, and even that was only as annexes to the Yorkshire entry.(There is some doubt as to whether Hougun was indeed an administrative district, or merely the chief vill in Furness and Copeland under which the other vills were listed).

==== William II ====
William II of England (William "Rufus") recognised that the state of affairs, as left to him by William I in 1087, was only a holding solution to the problems of the unsatisfactory position of the Normans above the Humber in the East and above the Ribble to the West.

In 1092, Rufus took over Cumberland by expelling the local lord, Dolfin, (who may or may not have been related to Earl Cospatrick). Then, he built the castle at Carlisle and garrisoned it with his own men, and sent peasants, possibly from Ivo Taillebois' Lincolnshire lands, to cultivate the land there. The takeover of the Carlisle area was probably to do with gaining territory and providing a strongpoint to defend his north-west frontier. Kapelle suggests that the takeover of Cumberland and the building at Carlisle may have been designed to humiliate King Malcolm or to provoke him into battle. The result was the last invasion by Malcolm and his own, plus his son's, death at the Battle of Alnwick (1093). The subsequent contest for the succession to the Scottish throne (between Donald III of Scotland and Edgar, King of Scotland) allowed Rufus to maintain his hold on the Cumberland and Carlisle areas until his death in 1100.

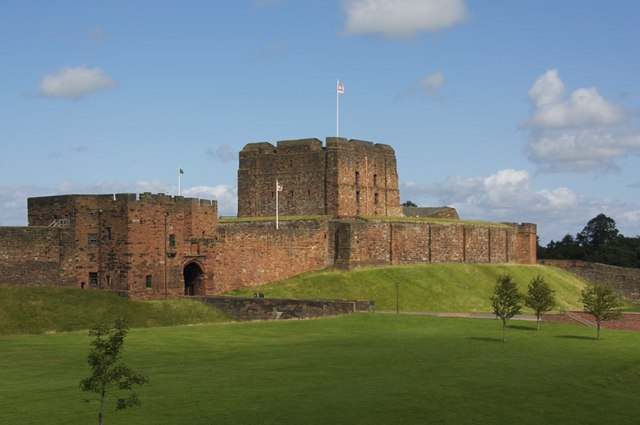
Carlisle Castle – begun by William Rufus in 1092; rebuilt in stone under Henry I, 1122–35, and David I of Scotland, 1136–1153

==== Henry I ====
A step-change occurred in the governance of the Cumbria area with the succession of Henry I of England. Henry enjoyed good relations with both Alexander I of Scotland and Henry's nephew, David I of Scotland, and therefore he could concentrate on developing his northern lands without the threat of a Scottish invasion. Either he or his predecessor, Rufus, possibly around 1098, granted Appleby and Carlisle to Ranulf le Meschin who became the strongman of the north-west frontier. (Others place the date of the grants after the Battle of Tinchebrai, that is, 1106 onwards). Ranulf was the third husband of Lucy of Bolingbroke, the first husband of whom had been Ivo Taillebois, whose Cumbrian and Lincolnshire lands he inherited.

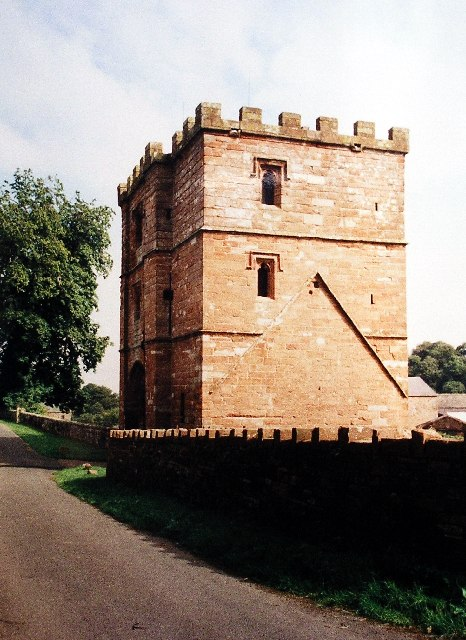
Wetheral Priory Gatehouse – all that remains of Wetheral Priory, founded by Ranulf le Meschin in 1106

Henry I himself visited Carlisle the following year, from October or November 1122. While there, he ordered the castle to be fortified and created "several tenures that would come to be regarded as baronies" : William Meschin in Copeland (where William built Egremont Castle); Waltheof, son of Gospatrick in Allerdale; Forn, son of Sigulf, in Greystoke; Odard, the sheriff, in Wigton; Richard de Boivill in Kirklinton. There is some doubt as to whether these enfeoffments were new or whether they were confirmations of tenants-in-chief under Ranulf's previous administration. Sharpe argues that Henry did not create "the institutions of county government" when he took charge directly.

Henry also took direct control (perhaps in the years after 1122) in Carlisle partly in order to ensure that the running of the silver mine at Alston was done from there. He also confirmed the property and rights of the monks of Wetheral; and he established the Augustinian priory of Saint Mary at Carlisle, becoming, in 1133, Carlisle Cathedral when a new diocese was created.

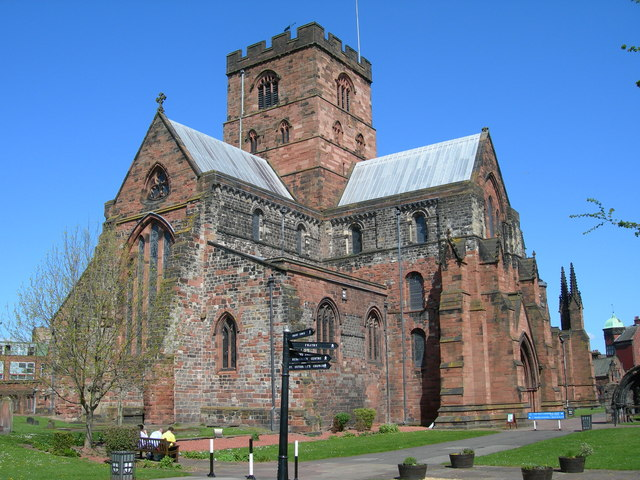
Carlisle Cathedral : founded in 1133

Henry, besides promoting his Norman allies into positions of power in the north, was also careful to install some local lords into secondary roles. For example, two Anglo-Saxon northerners, probably from Yorkshire, were Æthelwold, who became the first Bishop of Carlisle, and Forn of Greystoke. Waltheof of Allerdale was a Northumbrian.

==== David I of Scotland ====
With the death of Henry I in 1135, England fell into a civil war, known as The Anarchy. Stephen of Blois contested the English crown with Henry's daughter, Matilda (or Maude). David I of Scotland, who was Prince of the Cumbrians (1113–1124), and Earl of Northampton and Huntingdon, had been King of Scots since 1124. Having been brought up in the court of his mentor and brother-in-law, Henry I, as very much a Norman prince, he supported the claims of his niece Matilda over those of her cousin, Stephen of Blois.

G.W.S. Barrow asserts that, even at the beginning of his reign, David was thinking of the lands of Carlisle and Cumberland, believing, as he did, that "Cumbria" (that is, the previous entity of Strathclyde/Cumbria, covered by the diocese of Glasgow) was under the overlordship of the King of Scots, and stretched as far as Westmorland and possibly down to north Lancashire or even to the River Ribble. The (first) Treaty of Durham (1136) ceded Carlisle and Cumberland to David.

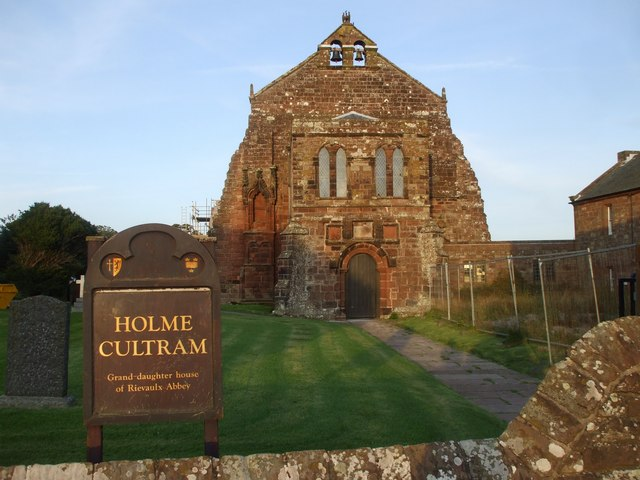
St Mary's Church, Abbeytown : all that is left of Holmcultram Abbey, founded by David I, King of Scots, and his son, Earl Henry, in 1150

David may have been intending to enlarge his control of northern England when he fought at the Battle of the Standard, some of the soldiers of David's force being Cumbrians (from south of the Solway-Esk line, that is). Despite losing the battle, David kept his Cumbrian lands, and his son Henry was made Earl of Northumberland at the (second) Treaty of Durham (1139). This arrangement lasted another twenty years, during which David minted his own coins using the silver from the Alston mines, founded the abbey at Holm Cultram, kept the north largely out of the civil war of Stephen and Matilda, and, by the "Carlisle settlement" of 1149, obtained a promise from Henry of Anjou that, upon the latter's becoming King of England, he would not challenge the King of Scots's rule over Carlisle and Cumberland. David died at Carlisle in 1153, a year after his son Henry.

==== Cumbria under the early Angevins, 1154–1272 ====
===== Henry II, 1154–89 =====
The pattern of trading upon the weakness of one side or the other continued as regards Anglo-Scottish relations in 1154 when Henry of Anjou became King of England. (The Angevins were also known, from 1204 on, as the Plantagenets). King David of Scotland's death left an eleven-year-old boy, Malcolm IV, on the Scottish throne. Malcolm had inherited the earldoms of Cumbria (and Northumbria) as fiefs of the English crown, and did homage to Henry for them. However, at Chester, in July 1157, Henry demanded, and obtained, the return of control to England of Cumbria and Northumberland. The King of Scots was given the honours of Huntingdon and Tynedale in return, and relations between the two countries were amicable enough, although Henry and Malcolm seem to have fallen out at another meeting in Carlisle in June 1158, according to Roger of Hoveden.

Henry took the opportunity of this relative peace to increase royal control in the north: justices toured the remote northern areas, taxes were collected and order was maintained. Hubert I de Vaux was given the Barony of Gilsland in order to strengthen defences. The accession to the Scottish throne of William the Lion in 1165 brought border wars, (the war of 1173–74 saw Carlisle besieged twice by the Scottish king's forces, with the city being surrendered by the constable of Carlisle Castle, Robert de Vaux, when food ran out), but no giving up of Cumbria (or Northumberland) to the Scots, despite Henry's troubles after the murder of Thomas Becket and the Scots' alliance with France. The Treaty of Falaise of 1174 formalised a rather coercive peace between the two countries.

Indeed, it was around this time that the ancient counties which made up modern Cumbria came into existence. Westmorland, in 1177, was formally created from the baronies of Appleby and Kendal. The barony of Copeland was added to the Carlisle area to form the county of Cumberland in 1177. Lancashire was one of the last counties to be formed in England in 1182, although its boundaries may have been fixed around 1100.

===== Richard I and John, 1189–1216 =====
Richard I of England, needing money to finance his crusade, abrogated the Treaty of Falaise in return for a subsidy from the Scots, who, although still asking for the return of Cumbria and Northumbria from both Richard (1189–1199) and John (1199–1216), were refused any concessions. John continued the policy of strengthening royal control over the northern territories, particularly in the business of gathering various unpopular taxes.

However, the lack of fighting over the border settlement changed for the worse when the civil war broke out in England between King John and his nobles in 1215. The new Scottish king, Alexander II of Scotland, supported the nobles in return for their promise of the restitution of Cumbria and Northumberland to Scottish control. A Scots' army marched into Carlisle in 1216–17. John drove out the Scots who then repeated the action. This situation was defused with the death of John in October 1216.

===== Henry III, 1216–72 =====
Henry III succeeded John as a nine-year-old but, despite this, an agreement was made between the English and Scots in 1219. The English kept the northern counties, while Alexander gained the honours of Huntingdon and Tynedale, along with Penrith and Castle Sowerby, the latter being in Inglewood Forest.

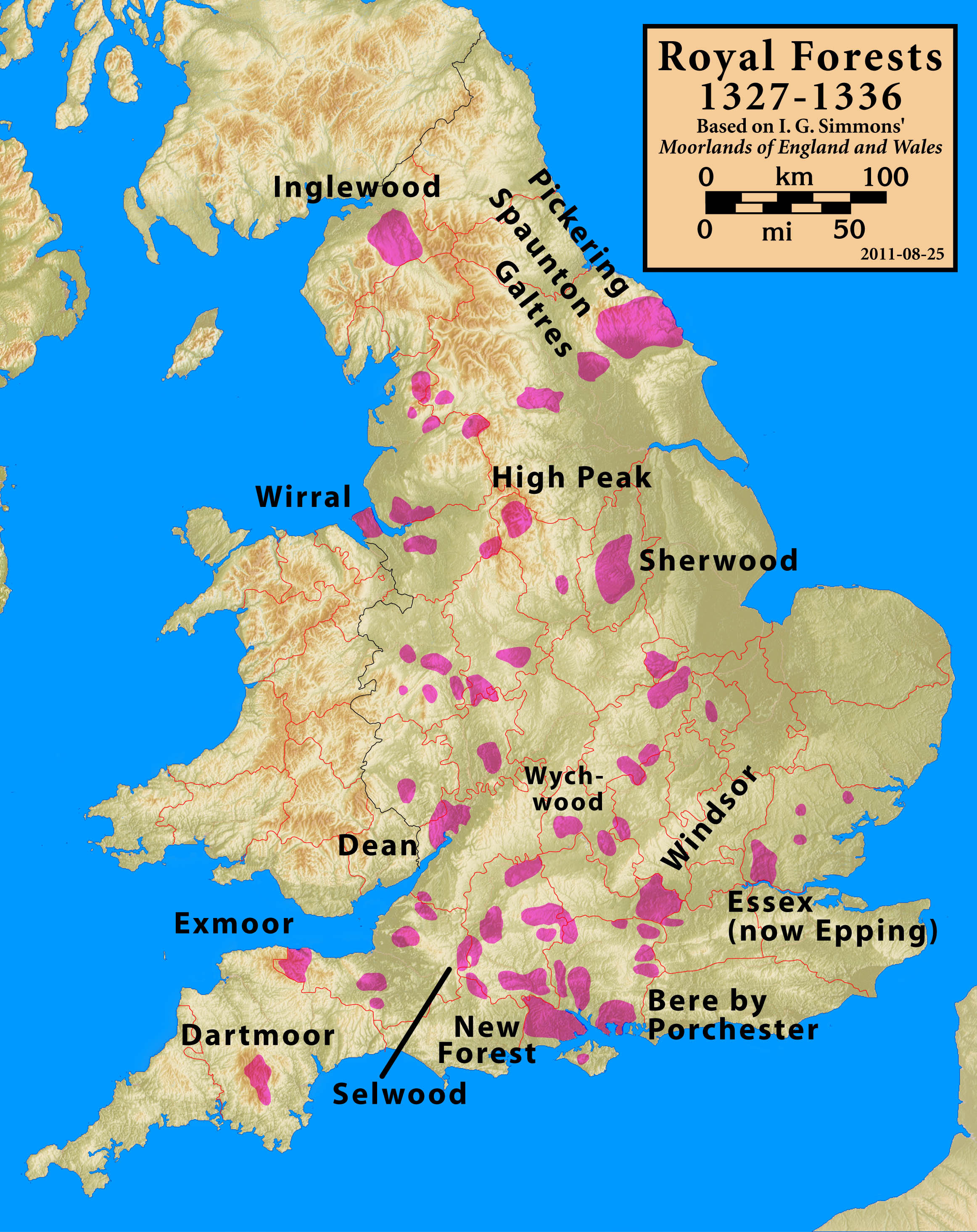
Location of Inglewood Forest, stretching from Carlisle to Penrith; it was the most northerly of the Royal forests

In 1237, the Treaty of York was signed, by which Alexander renounced claims to Northumberland, Cumberland and Westmorland, while Henry granted the Scottish king certain lands in the north, including manors in Cumberland. The Honour of Penrith was one of the areas of land granted to Alexander, and included, as well as the manor of Penrith, the manors of Castle Sowerby, Carlatton, Langwathby, Great Salkeld and Scotby. (The Penrith honour remained under Scots' control from 1242 until 1295).

The 13th century also appears to have been a period of relative prosperity, with many of the monasteries which had been established in the 12th century beginning to flourish; most notably Furness Abbey in the south of the county which went on to become the second richest religious house in the north of England with lands across Cumbria and in Yorkshire. Wool was probably the greatest commercial asset of Cumbria at this time, with sheep being bred on the fells then wool carried along a network of packhorse trails to centres like Kendal, which became wealthy on the wool trade and gave its name to the vibrant Kendal Green colour. Iron was also commercially exploited at this time and the wide expanses of Forest became prime hunting ground for the wealthy.

=== Later medieval Cumbria, 1272–1485 ===
The Scottish wars led to a hardening of the border-line as Anglo-Scottish nobles took sides with or against the English. Cross-border co-operation turned into cross-border warfare. The weakness of the English Crown's authority over the border region led to the rise of semi-independent border families, such as the Percies, the Nevilles, the Dacres and the Cliffords, who became the effective law of the land. At the same time, brigandage by smaller groups became commonplace, leading to families having to fend for themselves by building peel (or pele) towers and bastle houses. Scottish raids and cross-border feuding caused more harm than the Wars of the Roses in the Cumbria region.

==== The Scottish Wars of Independence ====
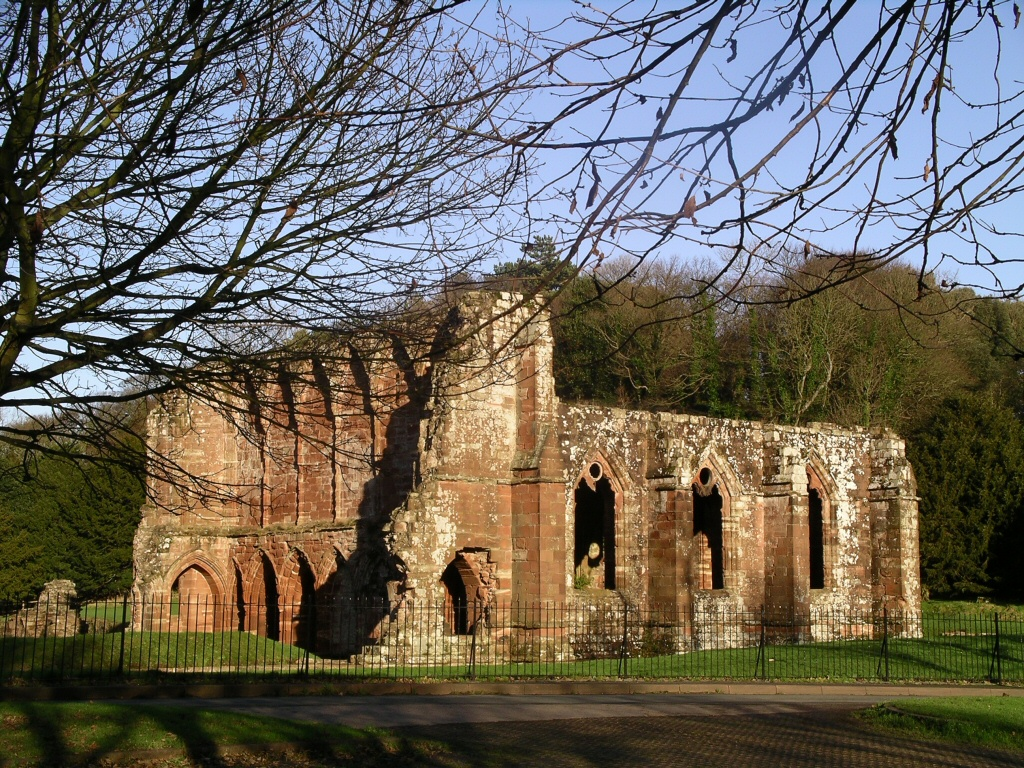
Furness Abbey, founded in 1123 by Stephen, King of England, attacked by the Scots in 1322

Towards the end of the 13th century, the peace between England and Scotland was shattered at the hand of Edward I, who wished to control Scotland. In 1286 he confiscated the manors granted in 1237, and in 1292 installed John Balliol on the Scottish throne. (The other contender, Robert de Brus, 5th Lord of Annandale, accepted this situation). Edward also took direct control of Carlisle in 1292, effectively denying the city's charter and municipal status. However, the outbreak of war between England and France in 1294 led Balliol to repudiate the agreement and in 1296 he invaded Cumbria (Carlisle holding out against him). Edward defeated him and took upon himself the government of Scotland; the lands of those Anglo-Scottish nobles who had backed Balliol were confiscated.

Renewed resistance came from Scotland in the form of William Wallace in 1297, (with Carlisle Castle withstanding a siege yet again), and with Robert the Bruce supporting Edward in the ending of the Wallace rising (1305). The death of Edward in 1307 and internal disputes in England under Edward II of England, allowed Robert the Bruce time to establish himself in Scotland after his having decided to renew his grandfather's claim to the Scottish throne (1306). After the Battle of Bannockburn in 1314, border warfare took place mostly on the English side of the line, whereas previously it had been on the Scottish side. The Bishop of Carlisle came to private arrangements with the Scots in order to protect his lands. A three-hundred-year period of regular raids and counter-raids followed which effectively undid the years of economic progress since the Harrying of the North two centuries earlier.

Two early raids of 1316 and 1322, under the leadership of Bruce were particularly damaging and were as far reaching as Yorkshire. On the second occasion, the Abbot of Furness Abbey went to meet Bruce in an attempt to bribe him into sparing his Abbey and its lands from destruction. The Scottish King accepted the bribe but continued to ransack the entire area anyway, so much so that in a tax inquisition of 1341 the land at nearby Aldingham was said to have gotten less and less in value from £53 6s 8d to just £10 and at Ulverston from £35 6s 8d to only £5.

The system of the Wardens of the Marches came into existence as a result of this First War of Scottish Independence (1296–1328) with areas on either side of the border being entrusted to 'wardens' who did what had previously been done by sheriffs in terms of military functions. These were experienced military men drawn from the powerful local families (Dacres, Cliffords, Greystokes, Percies and Nevilles in Cumbria). They ran their own private armies, paid for by themselves at first, later paid for by the Crown, sometimes being offered plunder in return for their support. (Some failed to prosper in the role: the career of Andrew Harclay, 1st Earl of Carlisle, who had defended Carlisle in 1315 and became Warden of the West March, was a case in point). A type of customary law grew up (March law) whereby disputes and criminal cases were dealt with by the wardens, rather than by Royal justice as elsewhere in the country. The wardens recognised special border tenant rights, in return for the supply of military service.

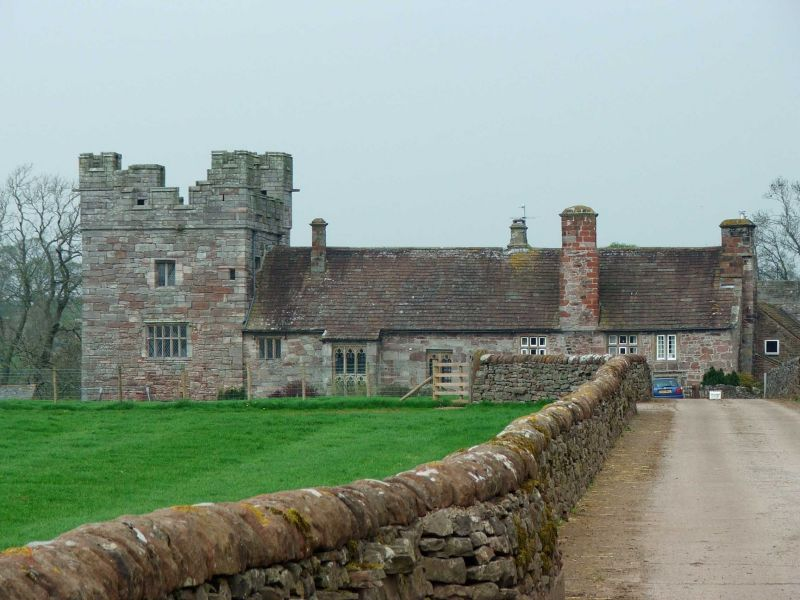
Yanwath hall – a semi-fortified house near Penrith

The border 'names' (magnates) and lesser families indulged in warfare and raiding across the border, the lesser brigands often receiving protection from the greater lords. As a consequence, throughout the 14th-century, there was an increase in the building of castles by the greater magnates, and in the building of fortified houses (peel towers, mostly built during c.1350–1600; semi-fortified houses, c.1400–1600; and bastle houses, mostly built c.1540–1640) by the lesser families. The authorities in Carlisle complained that the city's defences were being neglected as a result.

The Church was not immune to the raiding : the monks of Holm Cultram even built a fortified church nearby at Newton Arlosh. Furness Abbey, St Bees Priory, Cartmel Priory, and, in particular, Lanercost Priory suffered : Lanercost in 1319 being described as 'waste'. (The Bishop of Carlisle, in 1337, even went as far as joining the Cliffords and Dacres on a raid to Scotland, enabling him to gain sufficient monies for him to fortify his own residence at Rose Castle). Payment of protection money was another way to stave off the Scots : Carlisle paid £200 during the 1346 invasion, for example.

==== Edward III and the Hundred Years' War, 1327–1453 ====
The humiliation of Bannockburn and the unsatisfactory terms, from the English point of view, of the Treaty of Edinburgh–Northampton of 1328 (recognising a fully independent Scotland), led the young Edward III of England to back the claims of the 'Disinherited' (those nobles who had lost lands in Scotland) in their attempt to install Edward Balliol on the throne of Scotland. The subsequent Second War of Scottish Independence lasted from 1332 to 1357, which, although boosting the credentials of Edward at home, ended in David II of Scotland retaining the throne of an independent country. During this period, the northern counties were invaded and suffered some destruction. As mentioned above, Carlisle paid protection money in 1346 to David II while on his way to the Battle of Neville's Cross (men from Cumberland fought on the English side there).

By 1337, Edward was beginning to be embroiled in what was to become the Hundred Years' War with France, with the Scots taking the side of France. It has been said that "it became a habit of the French to drag the Scots into the bigger Anglo-French dispute when they might well have stayed out." Carlisle was besieged and the land round about laid waste in 1380, 1385 and 1387; in December 1388, Appleby "was almost completely destroyed"... and "never again achieved its former prosperity though it remained Westmorland's county town..." (Brougham Castle may have been destroyed in the same raid). These were the years during which most of the peel towers and warning beacons were built, around the Lake District dome, chiefly in the Eden Valley, the Solway plain, the West Cumberland plain and the Kent valley.

==== The Percies, the Nevilles, and the Wars of the Roses ====
The Wars of the Roses, fought between Lancastrian and Yorkist claimants to the throne of England, had some cause and effect in Cumbria, although no battle took place there. The intense rivalry between the landowners in Cumbria and elsewhere in the North fed into the factionalism at Court which was exacerbated by the mental instability of King Henry VI of England. The two main families were the Percies and the Nevilles.

The Nevilles had been promoted by King Richard II of England to counterbalance the growth of influence in the North of the Percies. In 1397, Ralph Neville of Raby was made Earl of Westmorland and also given the manors of Penrith and Sowerby, as well as being made sheriff of Westmorland. The Cliffords, based at Appleby and Brougham, were fearful of the rise in influence of the Neville family, (especially after the manors around Penrith had been given to them), and supported the Lancastrian Percy interest.

The subsequent attempt by King Richard to lessen the power in the north of the two families, (the Crown had few estates in the North to counterbalance those of the noble families), caused both Percies and Nevilles to back Henry Bolingbroke to become King Henry IV of England in 1399. Percy power over the wardenships was restored and the Nevilles were also rewarded, although less so. The rise of the Percies was stopped, however, in 1402 when they rebelled against Henry, (partly because of the rewards garnered by the Nevilles), and they never really recovered their position thereafter. The Earl of Westmorland, who had fought against the Percies at the Battle of Shrewsbury, where the Percies were defeated, was rewarded with the wardenship of the West March.

This low-level regional Percy-Neville feud turned into a national-level blood-feud in 1455, when Richard Neville, 5th Earl of Salisbury went over to the Yorkist cause of Richard of York, 3rd Duke of York (whose wife was Salisbury's sister, Cecily Neville).

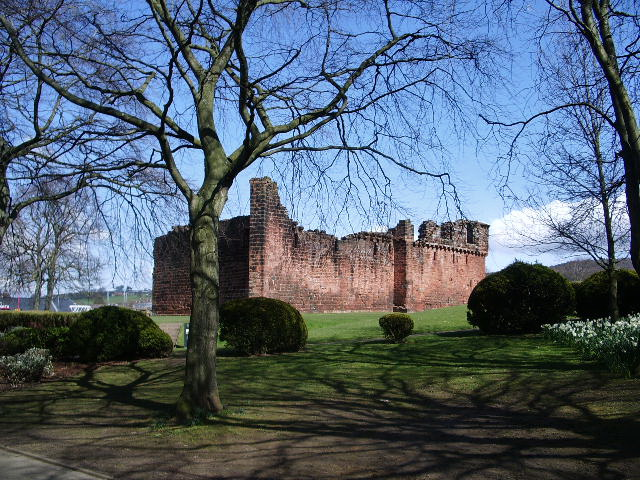
Penrith Castle : Richard, Duke of Gloucester, (later Richard III of England), was based here when Sheriff of Cumberland in the 1470s

In the subsequent Wars of the Roses (1455–1487), Edward IV of England made no attempt to raise levies in Cumberland or Westmorland, the northern counties being largely on the Lancastrian side. However, the Yorkist victories after the Battle of Towton saw the Nevilles making sure that MPs of Yorkist influence were returned at Carlisle and Appleby. Richard Neville, 16th Earl of Warwick (the 'Kingmaker') became sheriff of Westmorland. After the 'Kingmaker' went over to Henry VI's side in 1470, Richard, Duke of Gloucester, Edward IV's brother, received most of the Neville lands in Cumbria and Yorkshire, becoming Warden of the West March and Sheriff of Cumberland.

Most of the northern nobles backed Richard's bid to become king in 1483. However, at the Battle of Bosworth Field, Henry Percy, 4th Earl of Northumberland failed to support Richard (leading a distrustful Henry VII of England to make Lord Dacre the Warden of the West March).

Despite the local Cumbrian involvement in the dynastic feuding, more damage to the Cumbria region itself was probably done by the continuing Scots' raids and by cross-border feuding, than by the so-called "Wars of the Cousins".

== Early Modern period, 1485–1714 ==
=== Tudor Cumbria, 1485–1603 ===
Cumbria during the Tudor period, in terms of political and administrative developments, saw a period of turmoil and a response to it by the English Crown. The area was caught up in the continuing (and increasing) strife caused by local clans (the border reivers), by the religious reformation initiated by Henry VIII of England, by the subsequent rebellion of Catholic nobles and by war with the Scots. In the end, royal power was increased at the expense of the local great families. These various themes were actually linked.

==== The Border reivers ====
In the three hundred years leading up to the Union of the Crowns of England and Scotland in 1603, the Borderlands experienced constant unrest due to their inhabitants, known as the Border reivers. Military clashes between the two countries further fueled this instability. However, they are probably better known as a 16th-century phenomenon, due to the work of Fraser, who based his book on the "Border papers", a compilation or calendar of correspondence and other documents relating to the English Crown's administration (or lack of it) in the Borders during that century.

The reivers were characterised by strong kinship bonds, forming clan-like groups under a given surname (that could extend across the Anglo-Scottish borderline). These groups became semi-autonomous from local government, owing far more loyalty to their name than to the king or local lords. In north Cumbria, the more prominent of the clans included the Grahams (also distributed on the Scottish side of the border), the Hetheringtons, the Carletons, the Crosers, the Armstrongs (also a strong clan in Liddesdale on the Scottish side), the Routledges, the Nobles, the Milburns, the Storeys, the Hodgsons, the Hardens, the Tailors, and the Bells.

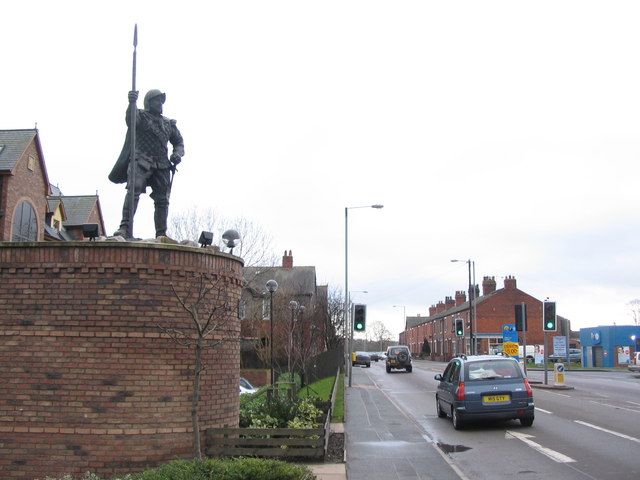
A Border reiver: statue in Carlisle

The reivers take their name from the fact that they lived by raiding (from Old English: rēafian, lit. 'to rob'), rustling cattle and sheep from across the border, and even looting the armies of their own king, such was their antipathy towards their nations. The reaving became so common and so violent by the 16th century that wealthier border families took to building bastle houses or pele towers—fortified dwellings, often with room for livestock and supplies beneath the accommodation—which are still a common sight in the north of Cumbria.

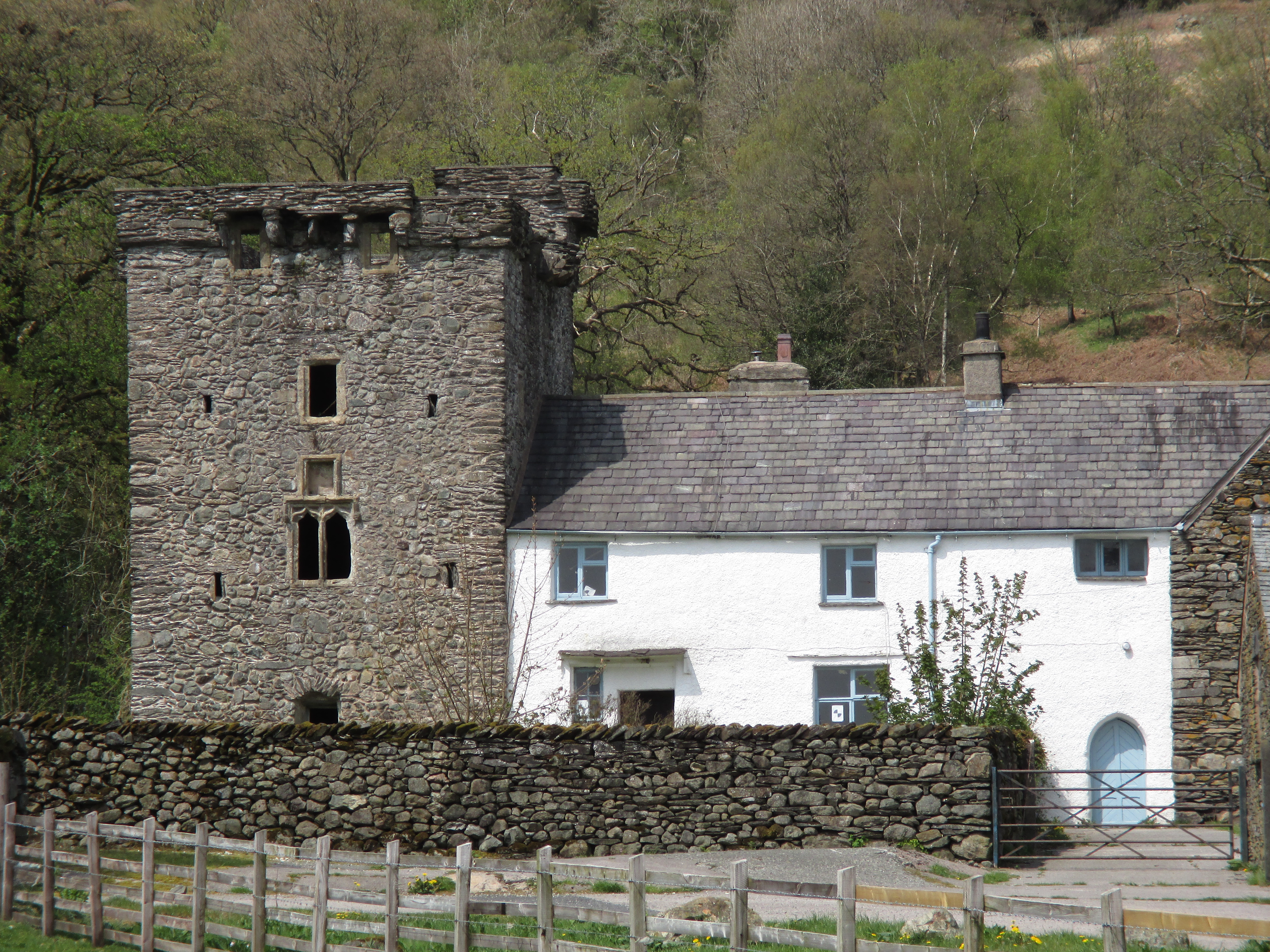
Kentmere Hall, an example of a Cumbrian Pele tower

In an attempt to deal with the growing problem, the English and Scottish monarchs installed local magnates, with extensive local connections and considerable power, as Wardens of the Marches, operating from around 1296 onwards (following the First War of Scottish Independence). The Wardens were tasked with keeping order and trying to enforce March law, a customary law that had evolved since the 13th century and maybe earlier. The north of Cumbria formed the English West March; the regions either side of the border had been parcelled out in the 14th century into zones called marches.

Despite its challenging position along the border, opposite the unruly clans of the Scottish West March and Liddesdale in particular, Cumbria did not suffer as severely from the reivers as might have been expected. The area around Bewcastle and around the borderline itself suffered, but the West Cumbrian Plain and the Eden Valley, rich agricultural lands both, were relatively untouched. The presence of Carlisle Castle, plus smaller strongpoints such as Askerton Castle, Bewcastle Castle, Naworth Castle, Burgh by Sands, and Rockcliffe, as well as the barrier of the River Eden, helped to divert the attentions of the reivers to the middle march valleys of Tynedale and Redesdale.

In Cumbria, the powerful northern families and other, lesser gentry, who were appointed warden and deputy-warden, included the Dacres, the Cliffords, the Musgraves, the Carletons, the Lowthers, the Ridleys and the Salkelds, many of whom were involved in or encouraged reaving themselves.

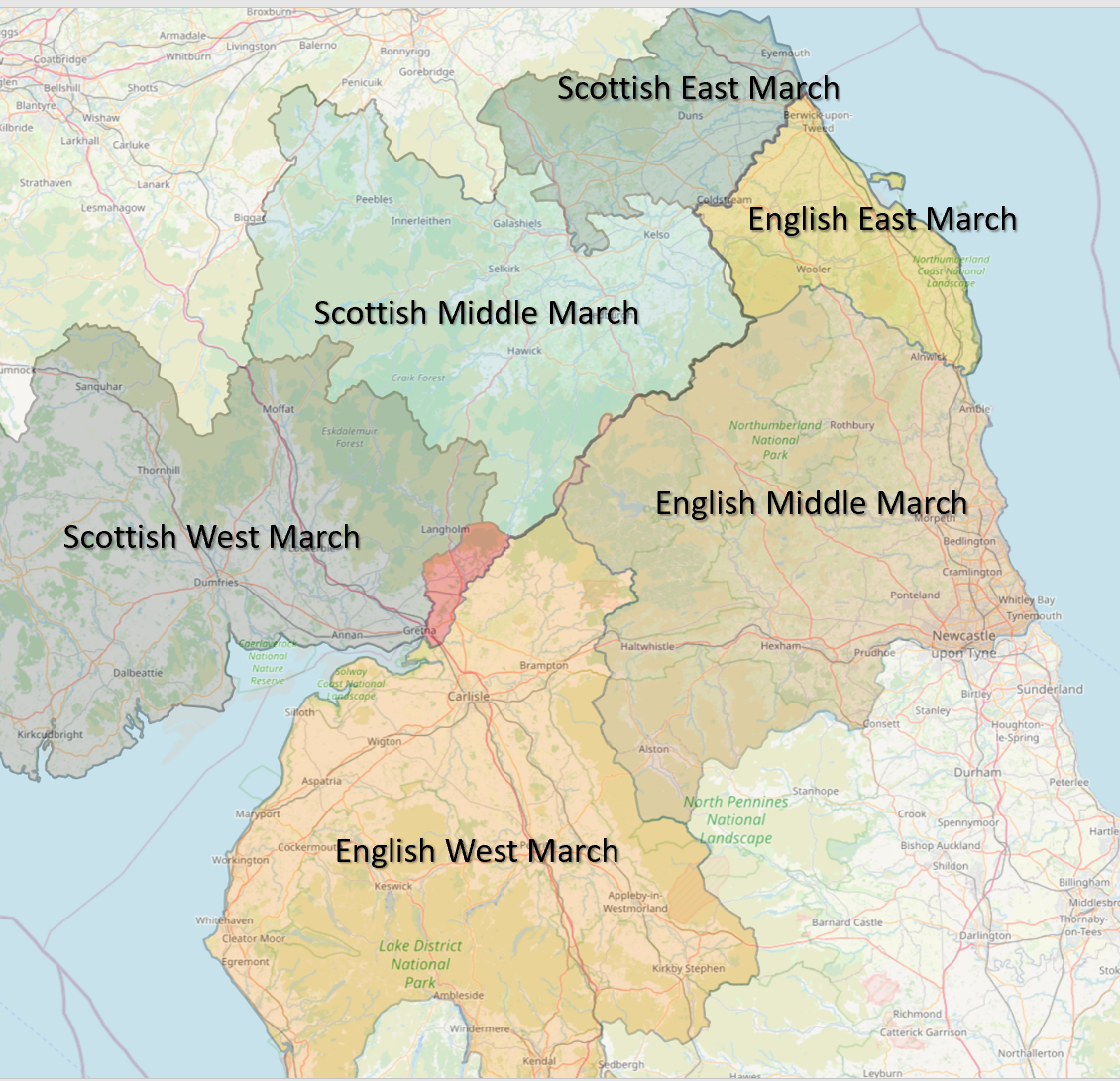
The Anglo-Scottish marches

It was not just the local magnates who might encourage the reivers, as the English and Scottish governments did the same. The reiver light cavalry were useful to the Crowns in fomenting trouble against the opposite realm when required to do so. Border horsemen fought in wars abroad and at home on behalf of the governments: Sir William Musgrave's 'prickers' (light horsemen) were involved at the Battle of Solway Moss, for example.

The problem of the reivers worsened in the last few decades of the 16th century, firstly because an increase in taxes forced an increase in rents which caused a breakdown of the ties between landlords and tenants, and secondly because many of the border families remained staunch Catholics following the Protestant Reformation. The reivers’ dominance ended only with the Union of the Crowns in 1603, when the border effectively disintegrated. This process was accelerated by a harsh policy of suppressing and eliminating many reivers.

==== The Reformation in Cumbria ====
The Reformation in Cumbria, in the sense of the drive towards church reform, was ineffectual compared to elsewhere in England. The baronies were in the hands of religious conservatives such as the Dacres, the Howards, and the Cliffords. The bishops (usually Royal nominees based in Richmond and then Chester administering the south of what was to become Cumbria, and in the poorer diocese of Carlisle in the northern sector) were themselves not greatly interested either (the brightest and best candidates were either scholarly in nature or wanted in London to serve the central government, or simply did not want to move to such an unimportant, remote, potentially dangerous, and poor position – in the North, the great prize was Durham). Thirdly, Cumbria lacked, with the exception of Kendal, any rising, relatively prosperous, town with an increasing merchant or middle-class (Protestantism was more likely to take hold in such places).

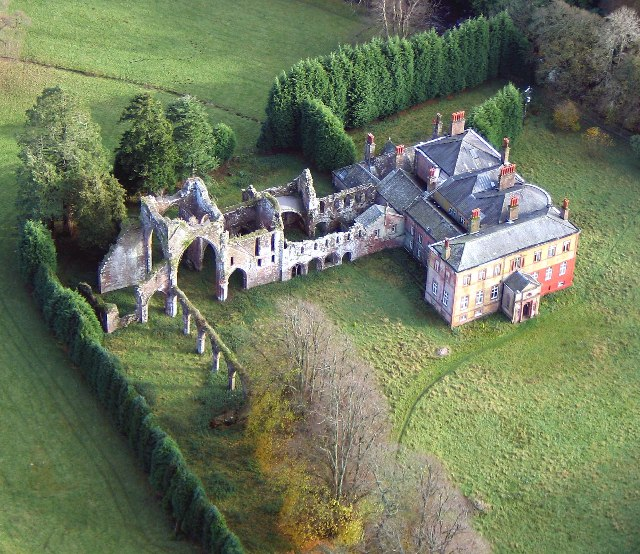
Calder Abbey

Of the twelve monasteries and priories in Cumbria, Lord Dacre, a keen Catholic, held sway over the ones in the north of the region : Holm Cultram Abbey, the Augustinian Priory of Carlisle, Wetheral Priory, Lanercost Priory, the nunnery at Armathwaite (near to which his father had built a college for priests at Kirkoswald), and even the relatively southern house at St. Bees. (The remaining houses were Furness Abbey, Calder Abbey, the nunnery at Seaton Priory, Shap Abbey, Conishead Priory and Calder Abbey). In addition, Scottish (Catholic) influence was strong in Cumbria.

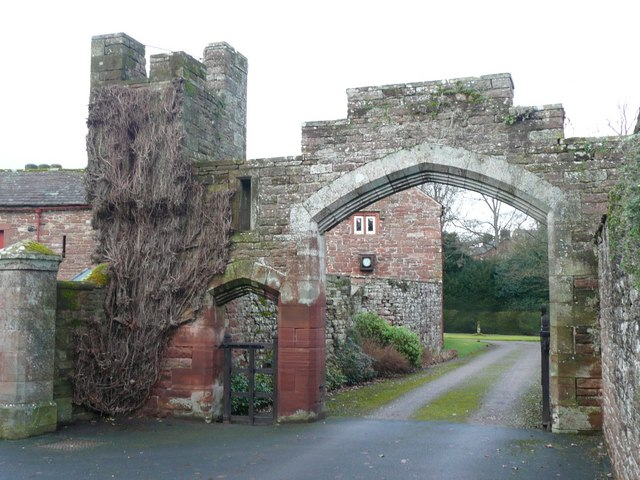
Gateway to the College at Kirkoswald

Cumbrian participation in the Pilgrimage of Grace (see below) indicated that people were ready for Catholic reform, and were not anti-clerical. Much of the ill-feeling was to do with the doing away with saints' days and their associated festive activities.

The Dissolution of the Monasteries, in terms of reallocation of church property, does not seem to have caused much consternation. The main beneficiaries were not the great nobles, but those who were not so conservative in religion and who could provide Henry VIII with a lever of power in Cumbria. So, the illegitimate half-brother of William, Lord Dacre, Thomas Dacre, a royal supporter, received Lanercost Priory and its lands (excluding the church) in 1542. Sir John Lamplugh received St. Bees, Sir Thomas Curwen received Furness Abbey, Sir Thomas Wharton received Shap. Many parishes, staffed by members of the monasteries, were left without priests.

The reign of Mary seems to have found Cumbrians restoring the Catholic services quite easily. The lack of Protestant preachers throughout the period (Kendal being the exception) was another factor, along with the simple matter of focussing on mere survival against plague, reivers and Scots, that militated against reform. There was perhaps a certain amount of ignorance, on behalf of the population, to theological argument, and a retention of superstition and even pagan ways. The parish clergy were few and ill-educated (the better ones, like the bishops, wanted livings in more prosperous areas of the country).

Therefore, in the 1560s, the Bishop of Carlisle, John Best, found little resistance to reform (except among some priests protected by Dacre and the Earl of Cumberland, both probably anxious about loss of local power after the Rising of the North). The real problem was not amongst the nobles and gentry, nor with recusants (there were relatively few of these in the 1597 count in the diocese of Carlisle compared with the number in Lancashire), but with the people themselves, who had other things on their minds.

==== Early Tudor Cumbria, 1485–1558 ====
As regards the Anglo-Scottish Wars of the sixteenth-century and their effect on Cumbria, the English policy was often one of either fomenting trouble for the Scottish Crown, sometimes using the reiving clans to do this, or else promoting open warfare. The attempt to further the Protestant cause in Scotland, either by support or coercion, was also a part of Tudor policy (with the exception of Mary I of England). The focus on Mary, Queen of Scots as a potential, Catholic, successor to Elizabeth I of England had implications for the Catholic nobles of Cumbria.

Fraser highlights the career of Thomas Dacre, 2nd Baron Dacre to illustrate the response to Scottish troubles in the early Tudor period. Having fought against Henry Tudor at the Battle of Bosworth, Henry nevertheless made Dacre deputy-Warden of the West March once he was King, because he was distrustful of the intentions of the Percies in supporting the Tudor cause in future. Dacre and his Cumbrian riders were prominent in fighting for Henry at the Battle of Flodden in 1513, and in the subsequent harrying of the Scots across the border. Thereafter, he became an effective Warden of the West March until his death in 1524.

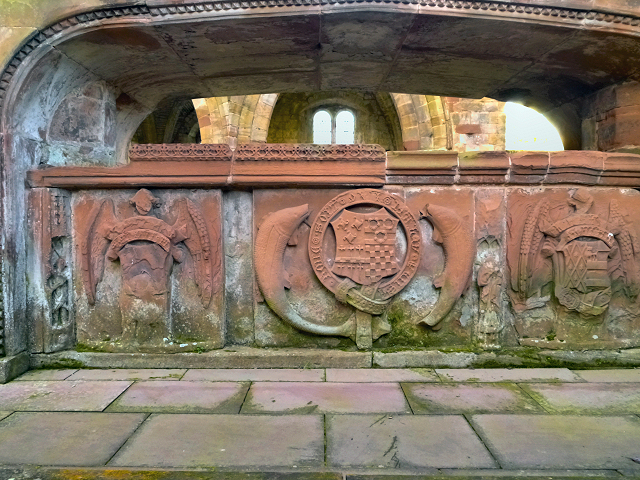
Tomb of Thomas Dacre, 2nd Baron Dacre at Lanercost Priory

The most notable incident, in terms of open warfare, was probably the Battle of Solway Moss in 1542. This came about after James V of Scotland, the nephew of Henry VIII, refused to follow his uncle's pro-Reformation policy in religious affairs. Local gentry, including Musgraves, Curwens, Dacres and Lowthers were involved in defeating the Scots. They were led by Lord Wharton, from a minor Westmorland family, one of the Tudors' "new men" who were in place to lessen the grip of the local nobles. (Wharton had been made steward of Cockermouth, a former Percy stronghold that had been relinquished to the Crown). The subsequent Rough Wooing and the battles of Ancrum and Pinkie Cleugh no doubt included Cumbrian forces as well.

When the horrors of the Anglo-Scottish war of the 1540s were at last over, the opportunity was taken to define, once and for all, which country was to have which bit of the Debatable land, a lawless area and refuge of fugitives . A Commission of 1552 drew the (straight) line, marked by a trench and dyke, that defined the border in this area hence forward.

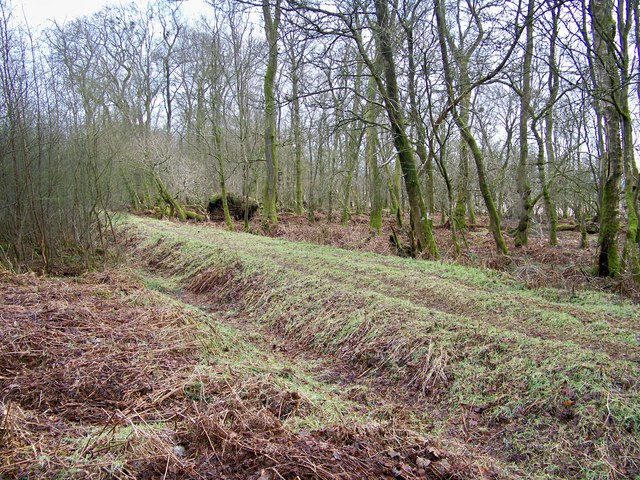
Scots' Dike

The Pilgrimage of Grace rebellion of 1536/37, (Bigod's Rebellion of February 1537 involved Cumbrian participation), had many causes: high prices, harvest failure, the loss of charitable help due to the Dissolution of the Monasteries, resentment against tithes, against grasping landlords and against religious changes. In Cumbria, especially around the Cockermouth and Penrith areas, the main factor seems to have been rapacious landlords, with the added animosity between the Dacres and the Cliffords preventing an early stop to trouble. (The Tudor policy of 'divide and rule' as regards the northern nobility helped to further local animosities and weak rule such as this). Clark, however, thinks that religious motivations were more involved in Cumbria than economic ones. The rebels reopened the monasteries that had been shut down in 1536, for example. Eventually, the two main noble families came together and Henry Clifford raised the rebel siege of Carlisle with Dacre help. Most of the Cumbrian gentry and clergy refused to back the rebels, of whom 74 from Cumbria were executed.

==== Cumbria under Elizabeth I, 1558–1603 ====
The next significant involvement with Scottish affairs was the reception, presumably by one of the Curwen family, of Mary, Queen of Scots at Workington Hall in May 1568. She then travelled to Cockermouth, after which Richard Lowther (1532–1608), the deputy-Warden of the West March, escorted her to Carlisle Castle, as there were rumours that some northern Catholic nobles may have wanted to rescue her from the English Crown's grasp. Lord Scrope, the long-serving Warden of the West March, removed her from Carlisle to his castle at Bolton in order to make her escape even more difficult.

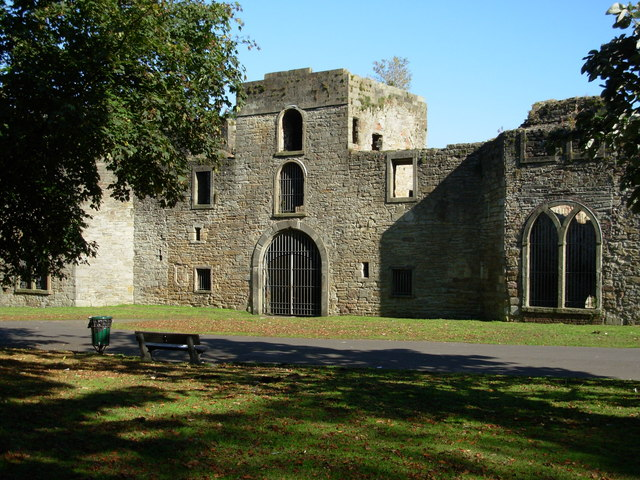
Workington Hall, the Curwens' family seat

The abortive Rising of the North came about after Mary was removed further south and a subsequent attempt to rescue her was planned. Local and personal reasons for the rising are thought to have played as much a part as court politics in the motivations of the noble participants, the main ones of which with Cumbrian links were Charles Neville, 6th Earl of Westmorland, Thomas Percy, 7th Earl of Northumberland (an M.P. for Westmorland) and Leonard Dacre (who rebelled in 1570). However, the main instigators were the lesser gentry who resented loss of power and status, as well as disaffected Catholics.

The Earl of Westmorland felt under pressure from the new Elizabethan rule as regards church payments (the new, Protestant, regime was asking for rent arrears to be paid). Also, as well as being out of sympathy with Protestantism, he was struggling with the loss of authority to the new place-men now wielding power. Dacre's suspect motives seem to have been to do with trying to prevent his inheritance from falling into the grip of the Duke of Norfolk (who was himself a potential focus of Catholic hopes, but who submitted to Elizabeth and whose daughters eventually (1601) inherited, or rather, bought from the Crown, the attainted Leonard Dacre's Burgh, Gilsland, and Greystoke baronies, as well as other manors).

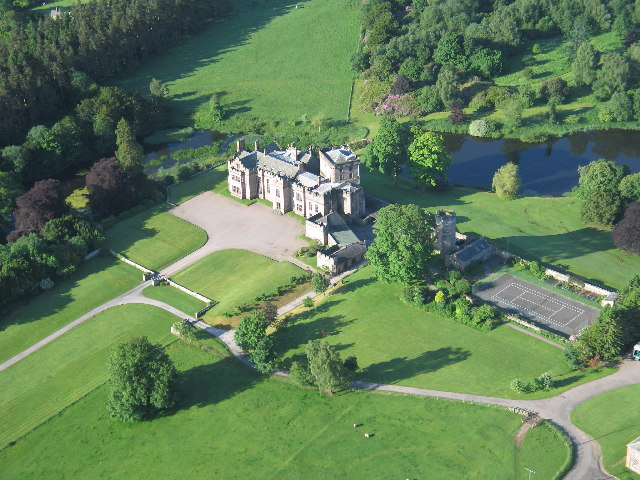
Greystoke Castle. Held by the Greystoke family, then by the Dacres and inherited by the Howard family during Elizabeth I's reign. Photo:Simon Ledingham

==== Increase in Royal power ====
Although some monks from Furness and Holm Cultram abbeys joined in the 1569 rebellion, few other people involved themselves. The whole episode showed the weakness of the northern earls after the Pilgrimage of Grace (they were not able to raise many soldiers from their Cumbrian or other northern estates). It also pointed to the increase in power of the Elizabethan state (directed through the Council in the North), and the more effective military might of the Crown, especially in terms of artillery and the control of castles. (Carlisle Castle was kept in Crown hands and was modernised in Tudor times to take into account the new advances in artillery, which could not be afforded by the northern nobility).

The northern nobles had always struggled, relatively to their southern estate-owners, to survive financially. Border duties against the reivers, civil wars, attainders and the natural death-toll amongst heirs and heiresses, meant a weakening of aristocratic power in the North. The system of partible inheritance and the nobles permitting multiple tenancies, allowed them to muster forces, (commanded by local gentry in times of war or against the reivers). But the financial consequences meant imposing harsh rents to pay for the system, and this caused resentment among the tenants, helping to weaken the authority of the barons.

The Tudor regime had inherited Richard III's northern estates, and Elizabeth also put in place her own local gentry whenever the opportunity arose (such as the attainder of Francis Dacre in 1589, which put most of the Dacre lands in Cumbria into Crown hands until 1601 when the major baronies were purchased by the Howard family). Elizabeth became "the dominant landowner on the Cumbrian border."

== Georgian and Victorian periods, 1714–1901 ==
=== Heavy industry ===
- Barrow Hematite Steel Company
- Vickers Shipbuilding Engineering Limited
- Seaton Iron Works

=== The making of the "Lake District": early travellers, the Picturesque, artists, early tourism and conservation, 1750–1900 ===
To many people, Cumbria is the "Lake District". "To many or most non-Cumbrians, it is the Lake District that defines the region of Cumbria, and the two units are often regarded, reductively, as synonymous." Some argue that the notion of Cumbria as a "region" is itself open to challenge, others say that the area (Cumberland, Westmorland and Lancashire north of the Sands) had a "perceived unity" that "long predated the arrival of tourists to visit the Lakes." Some writers, such as W. G. Collingwood (in 1902) and the poet Norman Nicholson (in 1969), attempted to bring together the two aspects of the Lakes and Cumbria in their writings. Nicholson, born and living in Millom, argued, in his book Greater Lakeland, that the Lake District area depended on the outlying towns and districts such as Carlisle and the Solway Plain, the West Cumbrian industrial towns, and, in particular, the small towns that fringe the lake and mountain core such as Cockermouth, Penrith, Kendal, Barrow and so on. Indeed, he said, somewhat pointedly, that "forget all this, and what all the rest of the country calls "Lakeland" will turn moribund, dying slowly from the edges inwards to become in the end little more than a beautiful, embalmed corpse in a rotting coffin."

==== Early travellers ====
Many of the people who travelled around and commented on the Lake District were people who did not live in the area. Their attitude to the Lakes was therefore coloured to some extent by what they knew of other areas of Britain and the Continent of Europe.

Daniel Defoe may not even have visited the Lakes when, in volume 3 of his A tour thro' the whole island of Great Britain (1726), he commented on the 'high and formidable' mountains' and the lack of anything of use or ornamentation to be found there – a pre-Romantic view of landscape prevailing with him.

Other travellers were perhaps less given to hyperbole. Celia Fiennes, for example, who made her journey between 1684 and 1703, (Through England on a side saddle), was more matter-of fact and more a reporter of what she actually saw – giving us "the last truly unconditioned reflex to Cumberland landscape", according to Nicholson. However, she still talked of "the desart and barren rocky hills" of Westmorland.

Thomas Pennant, a natural historian and antiquary, was more interested in the mines of Whitehaven than the Lakes (A Tour in Scotland, and voyage to the Hebrides, 1772); and Arthur Young more interested in the social and agricultural state of the area (A Six-months' tour through the North of England vol. 2, 1770) than in the landscape.

==== The Picturesque ====
Towards the end of the 18th century, the prevailing attitude to mountain and lake scenery, as noted above, underwent a profound change. This was in large part due to the effects of upper-class British travellers returning from the Grand Tour. The trip to see the sites related to classical antiquity, to be found in Italy and Greece, often took the travellers across the Alps, which started out as an obstacle to be overcome, and ended up as being a looked-for part of the adventure. The influence of Roman history (for example, Hannibal and his elephants crossing the Alps); of painters such as Claude Lorrain, Nicolas Poussin and Salvator Rosa; of literary men such as Joseph Addison, Horace Walpole and Thomas Gray (the latter two travelling on the Grand Tour together until they fell out and parted company); as well as of the literary take-up of the myth of Arcadia (by Alexander Pope, among others), all fed into the greater appreciation of the rugged Alpine scenery around them. This feeling was allied to notions of the Noble savage, and of a life to be lived away from the growing effects of the Industrial Revolution in Britain. At the end of the century, the onset of the Napoleonic Wars meant that trips to France, Italy and Greece could no longer be made; the search for Romantic scenery had to be confined to other, more local, areas, and the English Lake District fitted the bill perfectly.

Two (relatively) local clergymen who helped to promote a more receptive view of mountains and lakes were Dr. John Dalton of Dean (not to be confused with the scientist John Dalton of Eaglesfield) (A descriptive poem addressed to two young ladies at their return from viewing the mines near Whitehaven, 1755) and Dr. John Brown of Wigton (Description of the Lake and Vale of Keswick, 1767). The former spoke of: "Horrors like these at first alarm/But soon with savage grandeur charm/And raise to noblest thoughts the mind." The latter, in an (at first) privately circulated letter, compared Derwentwater favourably to Dovedale. This description persuaded Thomas Gray (Journal in the Lakes) to visit the Lake District in 1769, and, despite his sometimes rather overheated comments and timid nature, "no one doubts that it was he who cranked the tourist engine into life." As opposed to the Greek and Roman Classical view of the Lakes as being Arcadian, Gray emphasised the Miltonic Paradisical aspects.

The first to write a guidebook, pointing out Picturesque views from "stations" (places to station oneself), was Thomas West (A Guide to the Lakes of Cumberland, Westmorland and Lancashire, 1778), which remained in print for over fifty years. West promoted a "static, pictorial sense of landscape" as well as the Englishness of the Lakes, on a par with the Swiss and Italian models.

Once people were at the "station", it was William Gilpin (Observations, relative chiefly to picturesque beauty, made in the year 1772, on several parts of England; particularly the mountains, and lakes of Cumberland, and Westmoreland, 1786) "who told them how to look." Gilpin's "obsessive pictorialism and tendency to vagueness and generalistion" led to criticism of his rather theoretical and topographically inaccurate approach. Nevertheless, his "wider practical usefulness" made him influential. Both West and Gilpin recommended the use of a Claude glass (which Gray had also used) in looking at the "best" views.

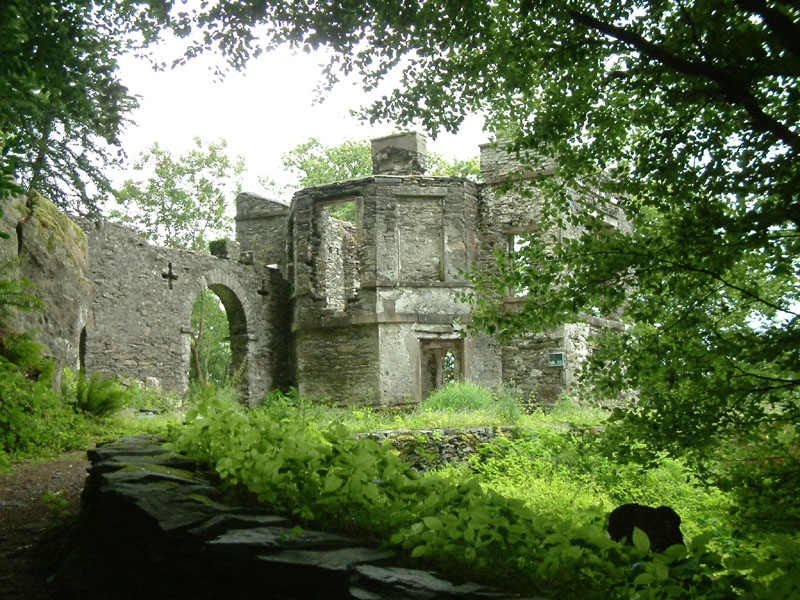
Claife Station on the western shore of Windermere – built in the 1790s with tinted windows angled to take in all the aesthetically pleasing views

If West and Gilpin were concerned with aesthetics, and Pennant with science, William Hutchinson concentrated on historical and topographical matters (An Excursion to the Lakes in Westmoreland and Cumberland, August 1773 [anon.], 1774. An Excursion to the Lakes in Westmoreland and Cumberland, with a Tour through part of the Northern Counties in 1773 and 1774, 1776. History of the county of Cumberland and some places adjacent, 1794). He and some friends rowed a boat to the middle of Ullswater and fired cannons to hear the echoes reverberate around the valley. For Nicholson, this was the high-water mark of the Picturesque as an egoistical "sounding-board" – concern, not for the landscape of people of the area, but for their own sensations.

Indeed, Nicholson, like others before him, aimed his critical venom at the Picturesque, calling it "an appalling distortion of perception," and argued that it "reduces the world to a mere scribbling-pad for man; it makes a convenience of nature." Also, "It denies the intricate reality of the world, the biological, geological, organic, physical complexity of which rock, water, air, grass, tree, bird, beast, and man himself are all part."

This criticism of the Classic, Arcadian, view of the Picturesque, aimed at a wealthy elite and promoting the building of villas and the landscaping of nature, had already begun in the 1790s, with writers such as Uvedale Price (Essays on the Picturesque, 1794). He argued against the 'improvement' of nature and for a less formal view, and an understanding "of the way things grew naturally through time and benign neglect..."James Plumptre, having read Price's Essays, wrote a satire on Gilpin (The Lakers : a comic opera, 1798) and others decried the felling of trees. A 'new Picturesque' sensibility emerged. 'Attempts were made to 'blend in' the villas being built with the natural landscape.

==== The "Lake Poets" and other writers ====
The "Lake Poet School" (or 'Bards of the Lake', or the 'Lake School') was initially a derogatory term ("the School of whining and hypochondriacal poets that haunt the Lakes", according to Francis Jeffrey) that was also a misnomer, as it was neither particularly born out of the Lake District, nor was it a cohesive school of poetry. The principal members of the 'group' were William Wordsworth, Samuel Taylor Coleridge and Robert Southey. Although Dorothy Wordsworth wrote no poetry of her own, she provided much of the inspiration for her brother William's.

There was a certain amount of additional irony involved in the 'School's' perception by readers, who were inspired, upon reading the poetry, to visit the area, thus helping to destroy, in the mind of Wordsworth at least, the very thing that made the Lakes special (although he himself ended up writing one of the best guides to the region). In addition, many of the first and second generation practitioners of Romantic poetry had a complex and not entirely easy relationship with the Lakes (apart from Wordsworth). "For the most part other Romantic poets either struggle with a Lake Poet identity or come to define themselves against what the Lakes seem to offer in poetic terms."

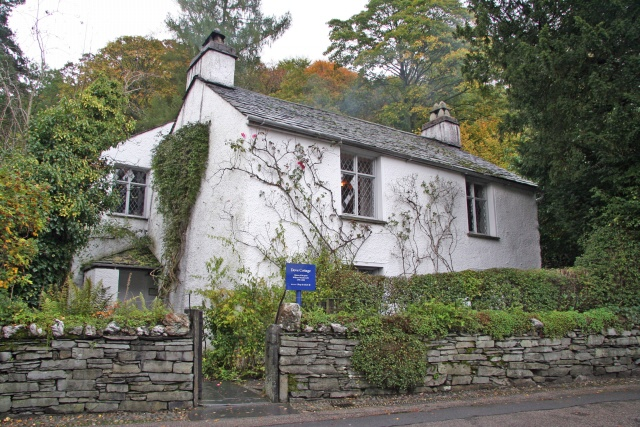
Dove Cottage (Town End, Grasmere) – home of William and Dorothy Wordsworth, 1799–1808; home of Thomas De Quincey, 1809–1820

For Wordsworth, who settled at Dove Cottage, Grasmere, with his sister Dorothy after some years of wandering, the Lakes became bound up with his identity as a poet. Born and brought up in Cockermouth and at Hawkshead Grammar School, Wordsworth came back to the area in December 1799 and settled into a 'poetic retirement' within his 'native mountains.' Although Wordsworth did not 'discover' the Lake District (see above), nor was he the one who popularised it the most, he "was destined to become one of the key attractions to the area, while his particular vision of his native landscape would have an enduring influence upon its future." Not just a 'nature poet', his poetry "is about the organic relationship between human beings and the natural world...' After a brief flirtation with the Picturesque in his Cambridge years, he came to see this aesthetic view of nature as being only one of many (although it is arguable that he "was under the sway of Picturesque theory", he frequently transcended it.) His 'vision' of nature was one that did not distort it in order to make art.

Wordsworth's early radical political ideas led him to his second poetic innovation: the use of 'plain language' and having for his subject the 'common man', as represented by the Dales-folk, (rather than "kings and queens, lords and ladies or gods and goddesses" as was the case up to then). His third innovation was to do with the inward-turning of his mind, producing a semi-autobiographical take on nature and imagination : his poem The Prelude, he wrote to Dorothy, was "the poem on the growth of my own mind."

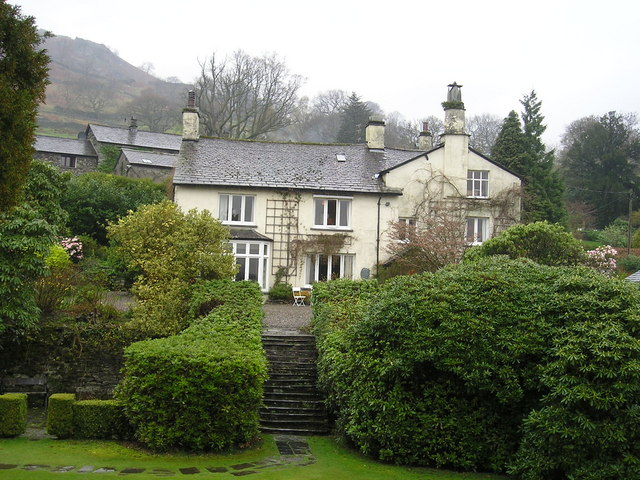
Rydal Mount – home to Wordsworth 1813–1850. Hundreds of visitors came here to see him over the years

Despite this reclusive side of his personality, Wordsworth was a strong believer in family and community, and he was much concerned with the effects on (especially poor) people's way of life of social change (for example, due to the enclosure movement) that were taking place. He disliked change that flew in the face of Nature: the planting of regimented lines of Larches; the coming of the railways; new building that did not chime with the vernacular; and the building of grand houses in the Lakes by the industrialists of Lancashire particularly upset him. In 1810 he published his Guide to the Lakes, tellingly subtitled "for the Use of Tourists and Residents", and with a Section Three entitled "Changes, and Rules of Taste for Preventing their Bad Effects." Nicholson argues that the Guide was the outcome of the loss of Wordsworth's poetic vision of nature and a turning outwards into hard facts in order to preserve his sanity after "years, perhaps, of disillusion, disappointment, of spiritual impotence..." Another aspect of it was the link to the ideas of Uvedale Price, mentioned above, whom Wordsworth knew and who proposed a "conservative, historicising and non-interventionist aesthetic". The Guide ran to five editions during Wordsworth's lifetime and proved to be very popular. Indeed, it has been said that "the architectural axioms of building and gardening in the Lake District for the next hundred years were established by the Guide".

For other writers, the region's pull was more uncertain. Coleridge followed Wordsworth to the Lakes and moved into Greta Hall in 1800. Although identified by his contemporaries as a 'Lake Poet', Coleridge's response to the landscape was at variance with the vision of Wordsworth, leading Coleridge to identify the landscape's "Gothic elements"..."and in so doing seems to recognise a potential for psychological horror rather than solace." Wordsworth's rejection of the poem Christabel, partly written at Greta Hall, for the Lyrical Ballads collection, added to Coleridge's depression over his personal life, his doubts about being able to write as he would have wished and his ill-health which was made worse by the Cumbrian climate. This led him to resort to the Kendal Black Drop, making matters desperate. Coleridge moved out of the area in 1804.

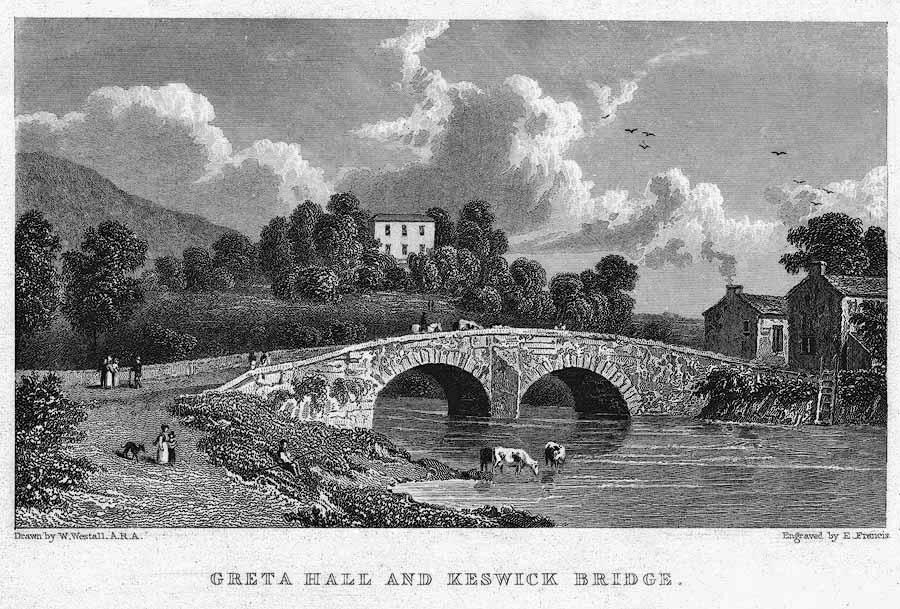
Greta Hall, Keswick – home of Samuel Taylor Coleridge, 1800–1804; home to Robert Southey, 1803–1843

Robert Southey, it has been argued, although becoming identified as the central 'Lake Poet' (he lived at Greta Hall from 1803 to 1843), was mostly a prose writer and did not particularly subscribe to the Wordsworthian vision of the Lakes. Southey, like Wordsworth, started out on the republican left, but, by the time the threat from Napoleon had dwindled, he had become the embodiment of a Tory extolling the virtues of nation and patriotism, and using the Lakes as a touchstone, and as "the symbol of the nation's covenant with God."

The second generation of Romantic poets were drawn to the area by the Romantic vision of seclusion and by the perceived republican views of the older poets, but found a different reality when they arrived. Shelley lived for three months in 1811 at Keswick, having been drawn to the Lakes by reading the early, "liberty and equality" Southey, only to find that Southey's views had changed and that the Lakes had been despoiled by "the manufacturers." Keats, in the Summer of 1818, had a similar response to that of Shelley, finding his hero's house full of fashionable people and Wordsworth himself away canvassing for the local Tory candidate. Keats moved on to Scotland which provided him with the inspiration he sought (and where, in particular, he felt the influence of Robert Burns). Byron did not visit the Lakes, but he ridiculed the isolation and narrowness of mind of the older Lake Poets, as well as of their abandonment of radical politics.

The hale and hearty John Wilson provided an alternative take on the role of Lake Poet. He lived near Windermere between 1808 and 1815 and knew the older Lake Poet trio well. His poetry (Isle of Palms) reveals a physical response to the Lakes scenery (he was an energetic walker and climber), and emphasises companionship and energy as against Wordsworthian quiet and solitude.

Wilson knew both Harriet Martineau and Thomas De Quincey. Martineau settled in a house she had built near Ambleside in 1845. As befitted her sociology-based background, her views concentrated on the need for the Lakes to be connected more with the outside world (for example, she was in favour of improved sanitation and of the new railways being set up through the district, unlike her friend Wordsworth). Her guide to the Lakes (Complete guide to the Lakes, 1855) was a rather factual and clear-eyed description about what to find there and about the condition of the people.

De Quincey moved into Dove Cottage in 1809 after having met his hero Wordsworth a couple of times before at Rydal Mount and then Allan Bank (Recollections of the Lake Poets, edited essays, 1834–1840). His worship of Wordsworth turned sour after De Quincey married a local girl and the Wordsworths refused to meet her. Instead, according to Nicholson, he turned more to the local dalesfolk and "he got to know the dalesmen as people, as persons, better than ever Wordsworth did." He reversed the practice of the Picturesque – instead of using the imagination to transform (and distort) the real, external world, he used the external world of the Lakes to feed his dreams and imagination.

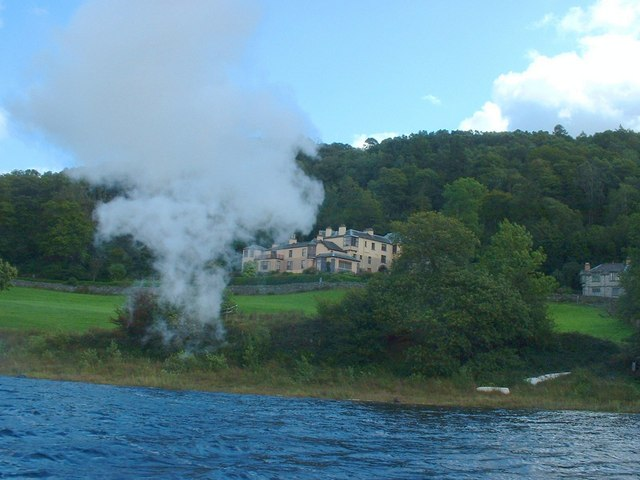
Brantwood, overlooking Coniston Water, viewed from the steam yacht 'Gondola' – note the angled, corner windows designed to take in the views

John Ruskin settled in the house Brantwood, overlooking Coniston Water, in 1871, aged 48, having visited the Lakes many times previously. Worn out in body and mind, he was looking for a restful escape, and it was this "weariness and despair that caught the sympathy of the Lake visitors. They, too, turned to the Lakes for comfort and rest," rather than for the "stimulus and excitement that had been the joy of the early travellers.". Ruskin, although he wrote little about the area, ended up taking on the mantle of Wordsworth as the "new Sage of the Lakes, the Picturesque Figure, the Old Man of Coniston." Nicholson saw him as the "Picturesque Figure" "for in him are combined its three main phases – the aesthetic, the scientific and the moral...". His scientific approach to the rocks and water of the Lakes, Nicholson argues, was an attempt, not to understand his subject, but to teach people how to react to it in a "practical and moral" way.

==== Lake painters ====
There was no equivalent Lake School of Painters to rival that of the poets. Those who came to the Lakes usually stayed only briefly and often as part of a larger tour of the North. Also, the painters and sketchers who did come were, with the exception of J. M. W. Turner and John Constable, not in the highest ranks of the craft. However, all did contribute to a more positive acceptance of landscape painting as a bona fide alternative to the genres of history painting and portraiture that had been the fashion previously.

Print-makers had visited the Lakes since the 1750s, one of the earliest being William Bellers (Six select views in the North of England, 1752) that "contained the first published images of Derwentwater, Ullswater and Windermere." Another was Thomas Smith in the 1760s who (over)emphasised the wildness of the Lakes, rather than the pastoral, Arcadian view of Bellers.

Joseph Farington (Twenty views of the Lakes, 1784–89) moved north to Keswick after having read Thomas Gray. Farington's paintings of the Lakes were more accurate than had been the norm previously. He had been a pupil of Richard Wilson, regarded by some as the founding-father of British landscape painting, and his patron was George Beaumont (also a pupil of Wilson's and also the patron of Thomas Hearne). Farington and Hearne toured the Lakes together, along with Beaumont, in 1777. Farington was also connected to the powerful Walpole family and became influential in the art establishment of the time. He and Beaumont helped to "establish the status of the Lake District as a northern Arcadia" amongst the upcoming painters of London.

Painters who were enticed north, amongst a host of others, included Philip de Loutherbourg (1784); Thomas Gainsborough (1783); Francis Towne (1786); Joseph Wright of Derby (1783–1797); Paul Sandby (1793).

J. M. W. Turner visited the Lakes in 1797 (Keswick, Lodore Falls, Borrowdale, Crummock Water, Buttermere, Grasmere, Patterdale, Ambleside, Coniston, Furness Abbey and across the sands to Lancaster and Yorkshire). Ignoring the Picturesque guidebooks, his paintings (worked up in the studio during the Winter from sketches done at the time), took some liberties with the topography, but are reckoned to capture the elemental forces of the Lakes more than anyone else. Later visits took place in 1801 and 1831. Turner took a mythic view of the Arcadian and Paradisal aspects of the Lakes, emphasising the "fragility, transience and triumphant returning"

John Constable came to Windermere in 1806 and stayed seven weeks, at his uncle's house, Storrs Hall, and then at Brathay Hall. Although no great paintings were produced from this trip, the numerous sketches and watercolours that he produced have been admired, and take their place in his development as an artist, dealing largely with questions of composition and mood. Constable was one of those artists, like Robert Hills who signalled a move towards the sketch, in HilVictoria and Albert Museum (1984), l's case moving away from the Arcadian panorama towards close-up views. Hills visited the Lakes in 1803, accompanied by John Glover (artist), and guided by William Green. Glover followed the Arcadian tradition of Richard Wilson.

If Turner and Constable took freedoms with what they saw in the Lake District, William Green, a surveyor from Manchester who went to live in Ambleside in 1800, decided to reproduce what he saw faithfully, like Farington. His was a painstaking and accurate depiction, in drawings, etchings and watercolours, of the topography of the land and of the architecture (he complained of the fad for modernising some of the old vernacular buildings). He became friendly with the Wordsworths and other local gentry and sold many of his engravings to them. He produced The tourist's new guide (1819) with sixty etchings and a text.

Of the 19th-century painters, mention might be made of Peter De Wint who imbued his paintings (watercolours and oils made from 1821 onwards) "with the Christian sense of immanence." Later in the century, painters followed Ruskin's ideas about 'natural composition', that is Nature, rather than human beings, was the model to go to, rather than pictorialism and the making of panoramas. The close-up view and accuracy of observation led to the "Romantic cult of the sketch or study" that was taken up by later painters of the Lake District. The landscape realists of the 1850s onwards did detailed studies in front of the subject and were often linked with the Pre-Raphaelite movement and with the newly established National Schools of Art and the increasing patronage of the museums and galleries of Liverpool and Manchester. Atkinson Grimshaw and Daniel Alexander Williamson are two representatives of this movement.

==== Early tourism ====
The early tourists (who came to the Lakes from around 1760 onwards) were pulled towards the Lake District because of their interest in antiquity, aesthetics, and science as expressed in the writings of Hutchinson, Gray, West, Gilpin and so on (a "counterpoint of curiosity with connoisseurship and of imagination with the senses.") But after around 1790, Nicholson argues, these motives became degraded to ones where "the curiosity of the scientist becomes a mere itch for oddities; the artist's careful assessment of the landscape in terms of visual beauty and design becomes a mere taste for prettiness..." The search for thrills by people who were no longer "explorers", but "holiday-makers", took over

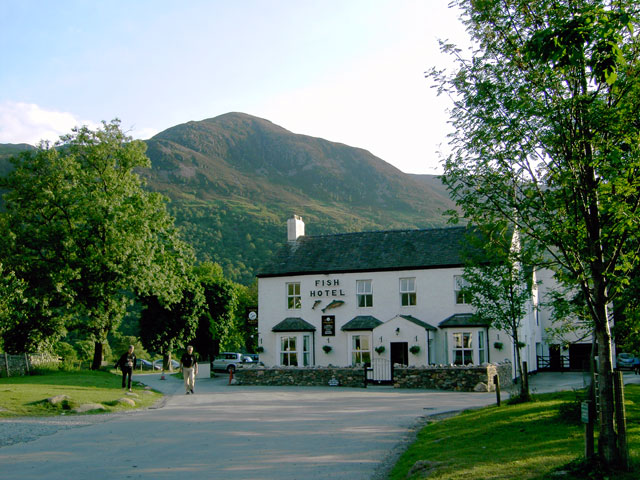
The Fish Hotel, Buttermere – where Mary Robinson worked

The writings and paintings of artists added to the desire of people to view the location of their art, and vivid stories such as the one about Mary Robinson, with its Picturesque overtones of a Primitive culture being corrupted by the evil ways of city-based civilisation, caused tourists to flock to Buttermere. They also came to see the regattas held by Joseph Pocklington, who had purchased Derwent Island House in 1778, (as well as the land on which the Bowder Stone stood in 1789). They viewed the curiosities to be found in Pocklington's friend (and regatta-organiser) Peter Crosthwaite's museum. Crosthwaite was the "first local man to see just how lucrative the tourist trade might become and to invent attractions specifically tailored for the visitors."

Fellwalking as a pastime was given a start by artists such as Ann Radcliffe (climbing Skiddaw in 1794), the Wordsworths, Coleridge, and John Wilson, and helped to convert walking in the park or landscaped garden into a desire to ramble in the countryside. With increased industrialisation in the North of England and all the medical and social problems that that brought with it, there was a desire, on behalf of the Government, to encourage the "working-classes" to have more contact with nature (Great Britain. Parliament. House of Commons. Select Committee on Public Walks. Report, 1833). The proximity of the Lakes to Lancashire offered an outlet for fresh-air and exercise to the increasingly numerous factory workers and town-dwellers.

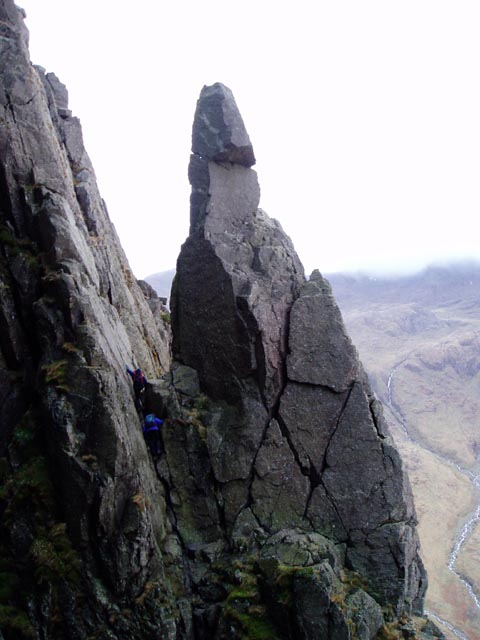
Napes Needle on Great Gable, a favourite of the early climbers

Mountaineering in the Cumbrian fells followed the same process as that of fellwalking (and of tourism) in that it also began as a pastime of the gentry and then broadened out for all classes. The Alpine Club, established in 1857, began using the Lake District fells for training during Winters when the conditions in the Alps were not suitable. However, the frequent lack of snow in the Lakes led to the birth of rock-scrambling, which then developed into rock climbing that could also take place in Summertime. The rock-climbers were not particularly interested in the Wordsworthian aesthetics of nature : they were "seeking to challenge nature rather than commune or become one with her." Owen Glynne Jones (Rock climbing in the English Lake District, 1897) established many new routes (on Kern Knotts Crag, Pillar Rock, Dow Crag) and was a friend of the mountain photographers George and Ashley Abraham. Walter Parry Haskett Smith was another pioneer, his name is often associated with Napes Needle.

==== The birth of conservation ====
Wordsworth has some claim to being one of the founders of the ecology and landscape conservation movement, although his motives may have been mixed and not meeting with modern-day approval.

One example of his views was that building should harmonise with their surroundings and draw from local tradition where possible. He and Dorothy's gardening work at Dove Cottage shows this in action. Even later, when planning for a possible new-build villa for himself and his family, the design was of a smaller size than those built by the industrial magnates of the time on the shores of Windermere and Derwentwater (for example, Wray Castle, Belsfield, Brathay Hall). The houses built or lived in by Martineau, Professor Wilson and Beatrix Potter reflected this low-key approach.

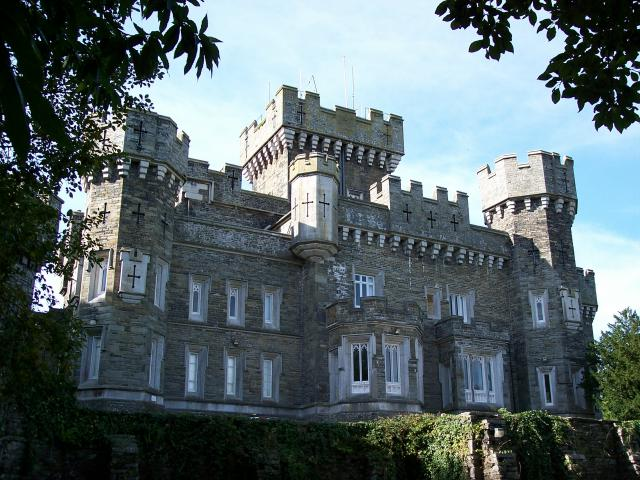
Wray Castle – built by a Liverpool doctor who had married a rich wife. Constructed in 1840 at the head of Windermere. Associated with two key players of the National Trust : Canon Rawnsley and Beatrix Potter

The railway speculators, the industrial tycoons (sending their workers off on holiday by rail), and local Lake District landowners and shopkeepers all had an interest in seeing the area opened up to the railways. Wordsworth fought a battle in the newspapers, from 1844 onwards (over the proposed Kendal to Windermere line), to keep them out, insisting that the taste for picturesque scenery was not innate and had to be taught to people (as his Guide tried to do). Apart from tearing up the countryside, the railway would cause noise and disturbance, and bring in hordes of (non-refined) people seeking pleasure. He was not quite prepared to let "ordinary" people use their own judgement about the Lakes, as Harriet Martineau was. Nevertheless, Wordsworth's plea, in his Guide, was taken up by future conservationists: he hoped that he would "be joined by persons of pure taste throughout the whole island, who, by their visits (often repeated) to the Lakes in the North of England, testify that they deem the district as a sort of national property, in which every man has a right and interest who has an eye to perceive and a heart to enjoy."

Ruskin, too, took up the fight against the Windermere – Ambleside/Rydal line extension, and also protested against a later, 1886, plan for a railway to Borrowdale. Like Wordsworth, he took a paternalistic view of the "lower-classes" saying that "I don't want to let them see Helvellyn while they are drunk."

However, the project that really made the Lake District into national news was Manchester Corporation Waterworks's scheme to dam Thirlmere to provide water to the city, first proposed in 1876 and finally "on tap" in 1894. Canon Hardwicke Rawnsley, the future co-founder of the National Trust was undecided : he was a strong advocate of the Lake District's ability to provide recreation, rest and fresh-air, as well as aesthetic pleasure, but also knew just how the big cities of the North needed pure water to prevent disease. The scheme was passed in Parliament in 1879. The removal of access to the shoreline and insensitive planting of conifers, the swamping of the hamlet of Wythburn, and the building of new roads were not judged a success by some locals and visitors.

The Thirlmere decision, and other subsequent attempts to drive railways to more sensitive parts of the Lake District, led Rawnsley and others to set up, in 1883, the Lake District Defence Society (later, The Friends of the Lake District). This organisation fought for access and conservation. In another move, Rawnsley, Octavia Hill, and Sir Robert Hunter set up the National Trust in 1895 (with a view to acquiring and managing land).

== 20th century ==
The historic counties shown within Cumbria Boundary of Cumbria Cumberland Westmorland Lancashire West Riding of Yorkshire

Local government districts 1974–2023: 1. City of Carlisle; 2. Allerdale; 3. Eden; 4. Copeland; 5. South Lakeland; 6. Barrow-in-Furness

The county of Cumbria was created in April 1974 through an amalgamation of the administrative counties of Cumberland and Westmorland and the county boroughs of Carlisle and Barrow-in-Furness, to which parts of Lancashire (the area known as Lancashire North of the Sands) and the West Riding of Yorkshire were added.

- 1910 Ais Gill rail accident
- 1913 Ais Gill rail accident
- World War II
  - Barrow Blitz
- Windscale fire
- 1995 Ais Gill rail accident

== 21st century ==
=== 2000–10 ===
In the 2001 UK Census, the county had a population of 487,607 (237,915 males and 249,692 females). Cumbria was one of the least ethnically diverse regions in the country: 99.3% of people classed themselves as being of any 'White' background.

Also in 2001, Cumbria saw a devastating outbreak of foot-and-mouth which resulted in the killing of 10 million cattle and sheep across the UK; out of 2,000 cases nationwide, 843 were in Cumbria. Cumbria was the worst affected county in the outbreak. Cumbria's agriculture and tourism industries were severely scarred, many tourists were put off visiting the Lake District, whilst the local economy is estimated to have lost billions. After huge efforts to prevent the disease from spreading further (by killing infected animals as well as disinfecting every vehicle entering certain parts of the county), the outbreak was officially halted in October 2001 (after beginning in February the same year).

In 2001, the South Cumbrian town of Barrow-in-Furness hit global headlines after an outbreak of Legionnaires' disease; the source of the bacteria was later found to be steam coming out of a badly-maintained air conditioning unit in the forum 28 media and arts centre; the disease killed seven people and in total there were 172 cases; it was one of the worst outbreaks of its kind in recorded history (the most deadly in the UK's history). Because of the 2001 outbreak, in 2006, Barrow Borough Council was the first public body in the country to face corporate manslaughter charges; the charges were cleared but chief architect Gillian Beckingham and Barrow Borough Council were fined £15,000 and £125,000 respectively. The maintenance contractor responsible for maintaining the plant later settled out of court with the Council's claim of damages totalling £1.5 million.

On the evening of 5 February 2004, dozens of illegal Chinese workers were collecting cockles off the Cumbrian coast when rising tides led to 23 of them drowning in Morecambe Bay. They were all illegal immigrants, mainly from the Fujian province of China, and were described as untrained and inexperienced. They were being exploited by gang leader Lin Liangren, who paid them £5 per 25 kg of cockles. Local authorities were alerted by one of the gang members who contacted them on a mobile phone, but only one of the workers was rescued from the waters; partly because the phone call was unclear both on the extent and severity of the danger, and on their location. A total of 21 bodies, of men and women between the ages of 18 and 45, were recovered from the bay after the incident. Two of the victims were women; the vast majority were young men in their 20s and 30s and it is presumed that two more bodies were lost at sea. The disaster led to the Gangmaster Licensing Act 2004 and the formation of the Gangmasters Licensing Authority (also the perpetrator, Lin Liangren, was sentenced to 14 years' imprisonment, numerous others linked with the disaster were also imprisoned on immigration offences and of perverting the course of justice).

One of several incidents to have occurred on the West Coast Main Line in the 21st century was the Tebay rail accident; on 15 February 2004 four railway workers were hit and killed by a trolley carrying lengths of rail which had not been properly secured and had run away from a maintenance yard several miles away. The boss of the rail maintenance company and a crane operator were tried on charges of manslaughter caused by gross negligence; both men were eventually jailed.

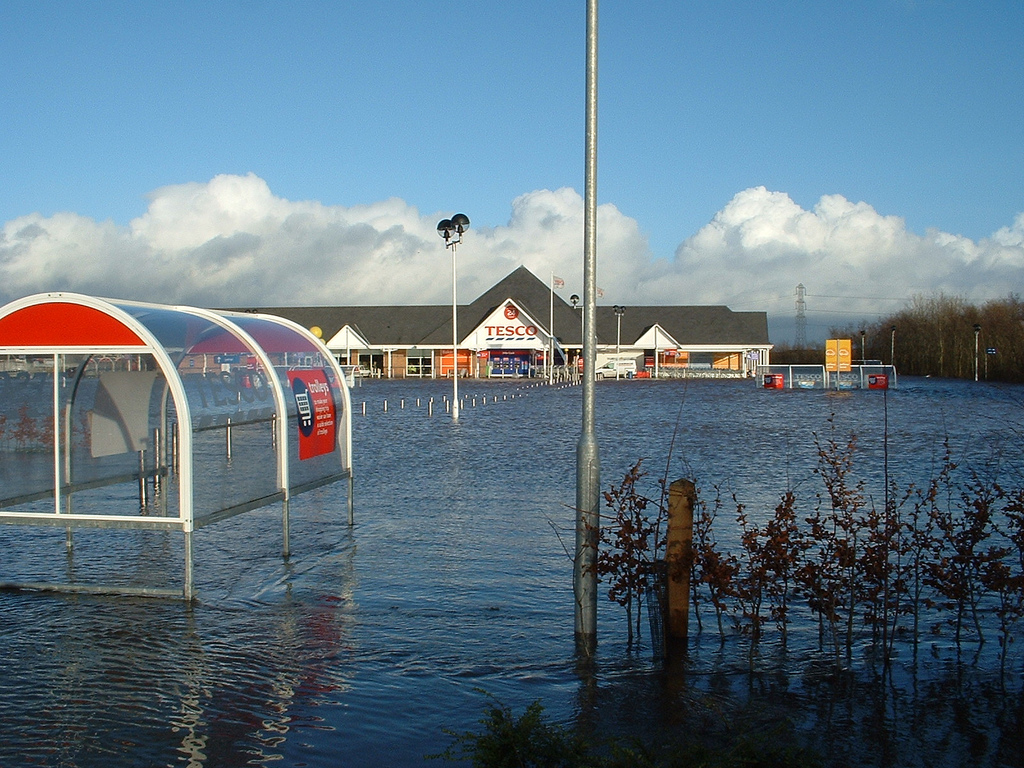
A Tesco store underwater in Carlisle during the January 2005 floods

On 8 January 2005, flooding caused massive disruption and damage across the north of the county, which was considered the worst flooding in living memory until the November 2009 Great Britain and Ireland floods. Carlisle was the worst affected location. More than 3,000 properties were affected, 60,000 homes were left without power and some areas of the city were under 7 ft (2.1 m) of water. Rivers Eden, Kent, Derwent, Greta and Cocker burst their banks, and £250 million of damage was caused.

The 2006 Morecambe Bay helicopter crash had Cumbrian authorities on standby, especially the RNLI station in Barrow; the fatal air incident occurred on 27 December 2006, whilst transporting replacement crew between the Millom and Morecambe gas platforms. The Eurocopter AS365N descended into the sea due to pilot error and this led to the death of six men.

On 23 February 2007 the 17:15 Virgin Trains West Coast Pendolino train service from London Euston to Glasgow Central, was derailed by a defective set of points in the Grayrigg derailment. Thirty serious and 58 minor injuries were reported and ultimately one person was killed. Richard Branson, owner of the Virgin empire, visited the site and although was devastated by the incident claimed that "If the train had been old stock then the number of injuries and the mortalities would have been horrendous". The 2009 Cumbria earthquake refers to an event on 28 April 2009 at 11:22 am local time when an earthquake of the magnitude 3.7 struck Cumbria. It was recorded by the British Meteorological Society as having an epicentre about 8 km (5.0 mi) underneath Ulverston. The earthquake was felt by residents in Lancashire and the tremor lasted for 5–10 seconds.

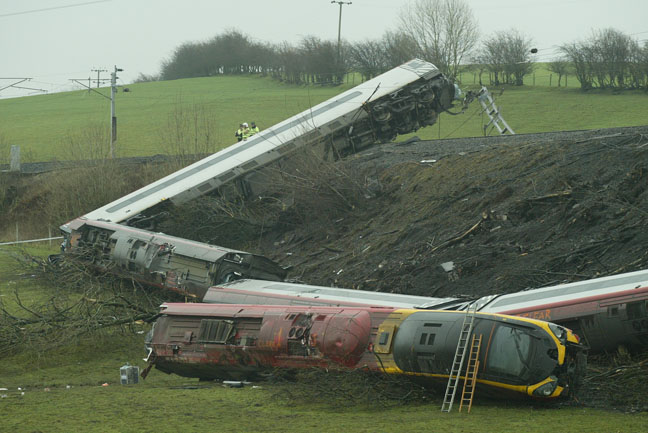
The site of the 2007 Grayrigg train derailment

During the night of 19 November 2009, some parts of Cumbria saw more rainfall than what is expected over the period of a whole winter month. The most intense period of rainfall broke nationwide records, and resulted in almost everywhere in the country being affected. However the worst damage occurred in the north and around Cockermouth and Workington where water rose to almost 3 metres in places, many Lakes of the Lake District overflowed and several bridges collapsed. There was one death: Bill Barker, a police officer who was directing traffic away from the Northside Bridge at Workington when the bridge collapsed into the river.

On 2 June 2010, one of the worst mass shootings in British history occurred in West Cumbria. Taxi driver Derrick Bird went on a two-hour shooting spree in the towns of Whitehaven, Egremont, and Seascale, which ultimately claimed the lives of twelve people (which included his twin brother, his family solicitor, and a former colleague; the other fatalities are thought to have been targeted at random). Dozens more were injured before Bird turned the gun on himself and committed suicide in a field near the village of Boot. The event also saw the complete lock-down of the Sellafield nuclear processing site, an action unseen in the plant's 50-year history.

Several overseas events which have affected the county. The War in Afghanistan has so far claimed the lives of three Cumbrians (two men and one woman – the UK's first female loss), whilst the War in Iraq has seen the deaths of two Cumbrian servicemen.

== Timeline ==
BC
| c. 11,000 | Ice sheets melt |
| c. 8,000 | Mesolithic hunter-gatherers settle coastal areas |
| c. 6,000 | Langdale Axe Factory begins |
| c. 3,200 | Castlerigg Stone Circle begun |
| c. 1,500 | Langdale Axe Factory declines |

AD
| c. 50–59 | First rebellion by Venutius against Cartimandua, failed |
| 69 | Second rebellion by Venutius, he gains possession of Brigantian kingdom |
| 71 | Roman conquest of Brigantes begins |
| 78 | Agricola advances in Cumbria and places garrisons between the Solway and Tyne |
| 79–80 | Further military campaigns by Agricola |
| 122 | Hadrian's Wall begun |
| 142 | Antoninus Pius abandons Hadrian's Wall |
| 164 | Hadrian's Wall reoccupied |
| c. 400 | Romans begin withdrawing troops to Europe |
| 410 | Official end of Roman Britain, Coel Hen takes over as High King of Northern Britain |
| c. 420 | Coel Hen dies, Ceneu takes over Northern Britain |
| c. 450 | Ceneu dies; Rheged created by Gwrast Lledlwm |
| c. 490 | Gwrast Lledlwm dies; Rheged given to Merchion Gul |
| 535 | Merchion Gul dies; Rheged divided into North, given to Cynfarch Oer, and South |
| 559 | Catraeth added to Rheged lands |
| c. 570 | Cynfarch Oer dies; Urien Rheged becomes King |
| 573 | Battle of Arfderydd (Arthuret); Caer-Guenddolau added to Rheged lands |
| c. 585 | Battle of Ynys Metcaut; Urien killed by Morcant Bulc; Owain map Urien becomes King |
| c. 597 | Owain map Urien killed by Morcant Bulc |
| c. 616 | Angles of Bernicia enter Rheged |
| c. 638 | Riemmelth, Princess of Rheged marries Oswiu, Prince of Northumbria |
| 685 | St Cuthbert granted land around Carlisle, where he founds a priory, and Cartmel |
| 875 | Danes sack Carlisle |
| c. 925 | Norse arrive |
| 927 | 12 July Eamont Bridge (possibly Dacre) Conference between Athelstan, King of the English, and the King of Scots, the King of Strathclyde and the Lord of Bamburgh |
| 945 | Edmund I defeats Dunmail and cedes Cumbria to Malcolm I of Scotland |
| 1042–55 | Siward of Northumbria takes over Cumbria south of the Solway |
| 1092 | William II restores Cumbria to England |
| 1098 | Ranulf le Meschin, 3rd Earl of Chester is granted Appleby and Carlisle |
| 1122 | Henry I of England visits Carlisle |
| 1133 | Carlisle Cathedral founded |
| 1136 | King Stephen forced to cede Cumbria to David I of Scotland |
| 1157 | Henry II regains Cumbria |
| 1165 | Border wars |
| 1177 | Counties of Cumberland and Westmorland created |
| 1182 | Lancashire created, including part of South Cumbria |
| 1237 | Treaty of York : Scots' king renounces claim to Cumbria |
| 1316 | Scottish raids along the west coast as far as Furness and Cartmel |
| 1322 | Scottish raids; the Abbot of Furness attempts to bribe Robert the Bruce |
| 1380, 1385, 1387/88 | Devastating raids by Scots |
| 1536/37 | Pilgrimage of Grace |
| 1568 | Mary, Queen of Scots, arrives at Workington Hall |
| 1569/70 | Rising of the North |
| 1745 | Battle of Clifton, last military battle fought on English soil |
| 1951 | Lake District National Park established |
| 1974 | Modern county of Cumbria established |
| 2023 | County council and all six district councils replaced by two unitary authorities |

== See also ==
- Cumbria County History Trust
- Kingdom of Strathclyde
- List of Cumbria-related topics
- List of monastic houses in Cumbria

== Sources ==
- Bailey, Richard N. (1980). Viking age sculpture in Northern England. Collins Archaeology. London: Collins. pp. xx, 21–288. ISBN 978-0002162289.
- Bailey, Richard N. (1985). "Aspects of Viking-age sculpture in Cumbria". In Baldwin, J. R.; Whyte, I. D. (eds.). The Scandinavians in Cumbria. Edinburgh: Scottish Society for Northern Studies. pp. vi, 167, pp. 53–64. ISBN 978-0950599427.
- Bain, Joseph, ed. (1894). The border papers : calendar of letters and papers relating to the affairs of the Border of England and Scotland preserved in Her Majesty's Public Record Office, London. Vol. 2 vols., 1560–1603. London: H.M. General Register House.
- Barrow, G. W. S. (1999). "King David I, Earl Henry and Cumbria". Transactions of the Cumberland and Westmorland Antiquarian and Archaeological Society. 2. 99: 118–127.doi:10.5284/1061380
- Barrowclough, David (2010). Prehistoric Cumbria. Stroud: The History Press. pp. [1]–251. ISBN 9780752450872.
- Barton, Nicholas (2009). "The lateglacial or latest Palaeolithic occupation of Britain". In Hunter, John; Ralston, Ian (eds.). The archaeology of Britain : an introduction from earliest times to the twenty-first century (2nd ed.). London: Routledge. pp. xvii, 454. ISBN 9780415477178.
- Beckensall, Stan (2002). Prehistoric rock art in Cumbria: landscapes and monuments. Stroud: Tempus. pp. [1]–160. ISBN 9780752425269.
- Bewley, R. H. (1992). "Excavation of two cropmark sites in the Solway Plain, Cumbria: Ewanrigg settlement and Swarthy Hill, 1986-1988". Transactions of the Cumberland and Westmorland Antiquarian and Archaeological Society. 2. 92: 23–47, quoted by Barrowclough, p. 183.doi:10.5284/1061553
- Bewley, R. H. (1993). "Survey and excavation at a crop-mark enclosure, Plasketlands, Cumbria". Transactions of the Cumberland and Westmorland Antiquarian and Archaeological Society. 2. 93: 1–18. doi:10.5284/1061526
- Bewley, Robert (1994). Prehistoric and Romano-British settlement in the Solway Plain, Cumbria. Oxbow Monograph. Vol. 36. Oxford: Oxbow Books. pp. 1–100. ISBN 9780946897667.
- Blair, Peter Hunter (1956). An introduction to Anglo-Saxon England. Cambridge: Cambridge University Press. pp. xvi, 371. ISBN 978-0521091046.
- Bonsall, C. (1981). "The coastal factor in the Mesolithic settlement of North West England". In Gramsch, B. (ed.). Mesolithikum in Europa. Potsdam: Veröffentichungen des museums fur Ur-und Frühgeschichte. pp. 451–72.
- Bradshaw, Penny (2011). "Romantic poetic identity and the English Lake District". Transactions of the Cumberland and Westmorland Antiquarian and Archaeological Society. 3. 11: 65–80. doi:10.5284/1064020.
- Breeze, Andrew (2006). "Britons in the Barony of Gilsland". Northern History. 43 (2): [327]–332. doi:10.1179/174587006X116194. S2CID 162343198.
- Breeze, Andrew (2013). "Northumbria and the family of Rhun". Northern History. 50 (2): 170–179. doi:10.1179/0078172X13Z.00000000039. S2CID 159825415.
- Breeze, D. J. (2004). "Roman military sites on the Cumbrian coast". In Wilson, R. J. A.; Caruana, I. D. (eds.). Romans on the Solway : essays in honour of Richard Bellhouse. CWAAS Extra Series. Vol. 31. Kendal: Cumberland and Westmorland Antiquarian & Archaeological Society on behalf of the Trustees of the Senhouse Roman Museum, Maryport. pp. 1–231, pp. 66–94. ISBN 978-1873124390.
- Breeze, David J. (2011). "The Roman military occupation of northern England". Transactions of the Cumberland and Westmorland Antiquarian and Archaeological Society. 3. 11: 113–136. doi:10.5284/1064017.
- Breeze, David J. (2012). "The Civitas stones and the building of Hadrian's Wall". Transactions of the Cumberland and Westmorland Antiquarian and Archaeological Society. 3. 12: 69–80. doi:10.5284/1063920.
- Brockington, R. A. A. (2014). "The Dacre inheritance in Cumbria (1569–1601)". Transactions of the Cumberland and Westmorland Antiquarian and Archaeological Society. 3. 14: 291–298. doi:10.5284/1063722.
- Brunskill, R. W. (2002). Traditional buildings of Cumbria : the county of the Lakes. [London]: Cassell, in association with Peter Crawley. pp. 1–224. ISBN 978-0304357734.
- Caruana, I. D. (1997). "Maryport and the Flavian conquest of North Britain". In Wilson, R. J. A. (ed.). Roman Maryport and its setting : essays in memory of Michael G. Jarrett. CWAAS Extra Series. Vol. 28. [Carlisle]: Cumberland and Westmorland Antiquarian & Archaeological Society on behalf of the Trustees of the Senhouse Roman Museum, Maryport. pp. 1–168, pp. 40–51. ISBN 978-1873124222.
- Clare, Tom (2007). Prehistoric monuments of the Lake District. Stroud: Tempus. pp. [1]–159. ISBN 9780752441054.
- Clark, M. A. (1996). "Reformation in the Far North:Cumbria and the Church, 1500-1571". Northern History. 32 (1): 75–89. doi:10.1179/007817296790175146.
- Clarkson, Tim (2010). The men of the North : the Britons of Southern Scotland. Edinburgh: John Donald. pp. 1–230. ISBN 9781906566180.
- Clarkson, Tim (2014). Strathclyde and the Anglo-Saxons in the Viking age. Edinburgh: John Donald. pp. xv, 1–204. ISBN 9781906566784.
- Collingwood, R. G. (1933). "An introduction to the prehistory of Cumberland, Westmorland and Lancashire-north-of-the-Sands". Transactions of the Cumberland and Westmorland Antiquarian and Archaeological Society. 2. 33: 184, pp. 163–200. doi:10.5284/1063168.
- Collingwood, W. G. (1938). Daglish, Eric Fitch (ed.). The Lake counties. Open-air Library. London: J.M.Dent and Sons Ltd. pp. xvi, 1–296.
- Cramp, Rosemary (1995). Withorn and the Northumbrian expansion westwards. Third Whithorn lecture, 17 September 1994. Whithorn: Friends of Whithorn Trust. pp. 1–24.
- Cunliffe, B. (1984). "Iron Age Wessex : continuity and change". In Cunliffe, B.; Miles, D. (eds.). Aspects of the Iron Age in central Southern Britain. Oxford: Oxford University Committee for Archaeology. pp. vi, 209, pp. 12–45. ISBN 9780947816025.
- Doherty, Hugh F. (2014). "King Henry II's charter for Adam, nepos of the Sheriff of Carlisle". In Keith J. Stringer (ed.). North-West England from the Romans to the Tudors : essays in memory of John Macnair Todd. Extra Series. Vol. XLI. Carlisle: Cumberland and Westmorland Antiquarian and Archaeological Society. pp. xviii, 288, pp. [87]–122. ISBN 9781873124659.
- Durham University. "The Corpus of Anglo Saxon stone sculpture : Cumberland, Westmorland and Lancashire-North-of-the-Sands". Durham: Durham University.
- Edmonds, Fiona (October 2014). "The Emergence and Transformation of Medieval Cumbria". The Scottish Historical Review. XCIII, 2 (237): 195–216. doi:10.3366/shr.2014.0216.
- Elsworth, Daniel W. (2018). "The Extent of Strathclyde in Cumbria : boundaries and bought land". Transactions of the Cumberland and Westmorland Antiquarian and Archaeological Society. 3. 18: 87–104. doi:10.5284/1084882.
- Evans, H. (2008). Neolithic and Bronze Age landscapes of Cumbria. BAR British Series. Vol. 463. Oxford: Archaeopress. pp. viii, 242. ISBN 9781407302973.
- Fell, C. (1940). "Bronze Age connections between the Lake District and Ireland". Transactions of the Cumberland and Westmorland Antiquarian and Archaeological Society. 2. 40: 118–130. doi:10.5284/1062982.
- Fellows-Jensen, Gillian (1985). "Scandinavian settlement in Cumbria and Dumfriesshire : the place-name evidence". In Baldwin, J. R.; Whyte, I. D. (eds.). The Scandinavians in Cumbria. Edinburgh: Scottish Society for Northern Studies. pp. vi, 167, pp. 65–82. ISBN 978-0950599427.
- Fraser, George MacDonald (1971). The steel bonnets : the story of the Anglo-Scottish border reivers. London: Pan Books. pp. xxii, [1]–361. ISBN 978-0330238571.
- Hall, Marshall (1979). The Artists of Cumbria : an illustrated dictionary of Cumberland, Westmorland, North Lancashire and North West Yorkshire painters, sculptors, draughtsmen and engravers born between 1615 and 1900. Newcastle-upon-Tyne: Marshall Hall Associates. pp. x, 102. ISBN 0903858010.
- Higham, N. J. (1985). "The Scandinavians in North Cumbria : raids and settlement in the later ninth and mid tenth centuries". In Baldwin, J. R.; Whyte, I. D. (eds.). The Scandinavians in Cumbria. Edinburgh: Scottish Society for Northern Studies. pp. vi, 167, pp. 37–51. ISBN 978-0950599427.
- Higham, N. J. (1986). The Northern counties to AD 1000. A regional history of England. London: Longman. pp. xx, 1–392. ISBN 978-0582492769.
- Higham, N. J.; Jones, G. D. B. (1985). The Carvetii. Peoples of Roman Britain. Stroud: Alan Sutton. pp. xiii, 1–158. ISBN 978-0862990886.
- Hind, J. G. F. (1983). "Who betrayed Britain to the barbarians in AD 367?". Northern History. 19 (1): 1–7. doi:10.1179/007817283790176509.
- Hogan, C. Michael (2007). "Hadrian's Wall, Misc. Earthwork in Northumberland". The Megalithic Portal. Megalithic.co.uk.
- Hunter, F. (1997). "Iron Age hoarding in Scotland and northern England". In Gwilt, A.; Haselgrove, C. (eds.). Reconstructing Iron Age societies. Oxbow Monograph. Vol. 71. Oxford: Oxbow. pp. 108–33.
- Hyde, Matthew; Pevsner, Nikolaus (2010) [1967]. Cumbria. The Buildings of England. New Haven and London: Yale University Press. pp. xx, 1–775. ISBN 978-0-300-12663-1.
- Jackson, K. H. (1963). "Angles and Britons in Northumbria and Cumbria". In Tolkien, J. R. R. (ed.). Angles and Britons. Cardiff. pp. 60–84.
- Kapelle, William E. (1979). The Norman conquest of the North : the region and its transformation, 1000–1135. London: Croom Helm. pp. [1]–329. ISBN 978-0709900405.
- Künzl, Ernst (2012). "Enamelled vessels of Roman Britain". In Breeze, David J. (ed.). The first souvenirs : enamelled vessels from Hadrian's Wall. CWAAS Extra Series. Vol. 37. [Carlisle]: Cumberland and Westmorland Antiquarian and Archaeological Society. p. 136. ISBN 9781873124581.
- McCarthy, Mike (March 2011). "The kingdom of Rheged : a landscape perspective". Northern History. 48 (1). Leeds: 9–22. doi:10.1179/174587011X12928631621159. S2CID 159794496.
- McCord, Norman; Thompson, Richard (1998). The Northern counties from AD 1000. A regional history of England. London:New York: Longman. pp. xix, 460. ISBN 978-0582493346.
- Mitchison, Rosalind (1982). A history of Scotland (2nd ed.). London : New York: Routledge. pp. x, [1]–472. ISBN 978-0415059251.
- Neville, Cynthia J. (1998). Violence, custom and law : the Anglo-Scottish border lands in the later middle ages. Edinburgh: Edinburgh University Press. pp. xiv, 1–226. ISBN 978-0748610730.
- Newman, Rachel (2014). "Shedding light on the 'Dark Ages' in Cumbria : through a glass darkly". In Stringer, Keith J. (ed.). North-West England from the Romans to the Tudors : essays in memory of John Macnair Todd. Extra Series. Vol. XLI. Carlisle: Cumberland and Westmorland Antiquarian and Archaeological Society. pp. xviii, 288, pp. [29]–60. ISBN 9781873124659.
- Nicholson, Norman (1995) [reprint of 1955 ed. published by Robert Hale]. The Lakers : the adventures of the first tourists. Milnthorpe: Cicerone Press. pp. 1–200. ISBN 978-1852841751.
- Nicholson, Norman (1996) [1969]. Greater Lakeland. London: Robert Hale. pp. 1–236. ISBN 978-0709058137.
- O'Sullivan, Deirdre (1985). "Cumbria before the Vikings : a review of some 'dark-age' problems in north-west England". In Baldwin, J. R.; Whyte, I. D. (eds.). The Scandinavians in Cumbria. Edinburgh: Scottish Society for Northern Studies. pp. vi, 167, pp. 17–35. ISBN 978-0950599427.
- Pennar, Meíríon (1988). Talíesín poems: introduction and English translation. Lampeter: Llanerch. pp. 1–119. ISBN 978-0947992248.
- Pennington, W. (1970). "Vegetational history of north-west England : a regional study". In Walker, D.; West, R. (eds.). Studies in the vegetational history of the British Isles. Cambridge: Cambridge University Press. pp. 41–79.
- Pettit, Paul; White, Mark (2012). The British Palaeolithic: Human Societies at the Edge of the Pleistocene World. Abingdon, UK: Routledge. pp. xix, 592. ISBN 978-0-415-67455-3.
- Phythian-Adams, Charles (1996). Land of the Cumbrians : a study in British provincial origins, A.D. 400-1120. Aldershot; Brookfield: Scolar Press; Ashgate. pp. xiv, 207. ISBN 978-1859283271.
- Phythian-Adams, Charles (2011). "From Peoples to Regional Societies: the problem of early medieval Cumbrian identities". Transactions of the Cumberland and Westmorland Antiquarian and Archaeological Society. 3. 11: [51]–64. doi:10.5284/1064021.
- Pollard, Anthony (September 1993). "Percies, Nevilles and the Wars of the Roses". History Today. 43: 41–48.
- Reid, R. R. (1917). "The Office of Warden of the March : its origin and early history". English Historical Review. 32: 479–496. doi:10.1093/ehr/xxxii.cxxviii.479.
- Rollinson, William (1996). A history of Cumberland and Westmorland. The Darwen County History Series (2nd ed.). Chichester: Phillimore. pp. [1]–144. ISBN 978-1860770098.
- Ross, Catherine (2012). "The Carvetii - a pro-Roman community?". Transactions of the Cumberland and Westmorland Antiquarian and Archaeological Society. 3. 12: 55–68. doi:10.5284/1063921.
- Sharpe, Richard (2006). Norman rule in Cumbria, 1092–1136 : a lecture delivered to Cumberland and Westmorland Antiquarian and Archeological Society on 9th April 2005 at Carlisle. CWAAS Tract Series. Vol. XXI. [Carlisle]: Cumberland and Westmorland Antiquarian and Archaeological Society. pp. 1–78. ISBN 978-1873124437.
- Shotter, David (September 2000). "Petillius Cerialis in northern Britain". Northern History. 36 (2): 189–198. doi:10.1179/007817200790177879. S2CID 162371799.
- Shotter, David (2004). Romans and Britons in North-West England (3rd ed.). Lancaster: Centre for North-West Regional Studies, University of Lancaster. pp. xii, 204. ISBN 978-1862201521.
- Shotter, David (2014). "Roman Cumbria : Rome's "wild west"?". In Stringer, Keith J. (ed.). North-West England from the Romans to the Tudors : essays in memory of John Macnair Todd. Extra Series. Vol. XLI. Carlisle: Cumberland and Westmorland Antiquarian and Archaeological Society. pp. xviii, 288, pp. [1]–28. ISBN 9781873124659.
- Smith, I. R.; Wilkinson, D. M.; O'Regan, H. J. (September 2013). "New Lateglacial fauna and early Mesolithic human remains from northern England". Journal of Quaternary Science. 28 (6): 542–544. Bibcode:2013JQS....28..542S. doi:10.1002/jqs.2655. S2CID 128456053.
- Solnit, Rebecca (2002). Wanderlust : a history of walking. London: Verso. pp. 1–328. ISBN 9781844675586.
- Stringer, Keith (2014). "Lordship and society in Medieval Cumberland : Gilsland under the Moulton's (c.1240-1313)". In Stringer, Keith J. (ed.). North-West England from the Romans to the Tudors : essays in memory of John Macnair Todd. Extra Series. Vol. XLI. Carlisle: Cumberland and Westmorland Antiquarian and Archaeological Society. pp. xviii, 288, pp. [123]–167. ISBN 9781873124659.
- Summerson, Henry (1993). Medieval Carlisle: The City and the Borders from the Late Eleventh to the Mid-Sixteenth Century (2 vols). The Cumberland and Westmorland Antiquarian and Archaeological Society, Extra Series XXV. Kendal: The Cumberland and Westmorland Antiquarian and Archaeological Society. ISBN 978-1-873124-18-5.
- Summerson, Henry (2014). "Problems of an Elizabethan prelate : the episcopate of John May, Bishop of Carlisle (1577–1598)". In Stringer, Keith J. (ed.). North-West England from the Romans to the Tudors : essays in memory of John Macnair Todd. Extra Series. Vol. XLI. Carlisle: Cumberland and Westmorland Antiquarian and Archaeological Society. pp. xviii, 288, pp. [235]–271. ISBN 9781873124659.
- Thompson, Ian (2010). The English Lakes : a history. London : New York: Bloomsbury. pp. [viii], [1]–343. ISBN 9780747598381.
- Todd, John (2005). "British (Cumbric) place-names in the Barony of Gilsland". Transactions of the Cumberland and Westmorland Antiquarian and Archaeological Society. 3. 5: 89–102. doi:10.5284/1064552.
- Townend, Matthew (2009). The Vikings and Victorian Lakeland : the Norse medievalism of W.G.Collingwood and his contemporaries. CWAAS Extra Series. Vol. 34. Kendal: Cumberland & Westmorland Antiquarian and Archaeological Society. pp. xv, 328. ISBN 9781873124499.
- Townend, Matthew (2011). "Cumbrian identities : introduction". Transactions of the Cumberland and Westmorland Antiquarian and Archaeological Society. 3. 11: 11–14. doi:10.5284/1064024.
- Tuck, J. A. (1986). "The emergence of a northern nobility, 1250–1450". Northern History. 22: 1–17. doi:10.1179/007817286790616516.
- Turner, R. C. (1988). "A Cumbrian bog body from Scaleby". Transactions of the Cumberland and Westmorland Antiquarian and Archaeological Society. 2. 88: 1–7. doi:10.5284/1061666.
- Turner, R. C. (1989). "Another Cumbrian bog body, found in Seascale Moss in 1834". Transactions of the Cumberland and Westmorland Antiquarian and Archaeological Society. 2. 89: 21–23. doi:10.5284/1061636.
- Victoria and Albert Museum (1984). The discovery of the Lake District : a Northern Arcadia and its uses. [London]: V & A. pp. [1]–174. ISBN 978-0905209968.
- Walton, John K. (2011). "Cumbrian identities : some historical contexts". Transactions of the Cumberland and Westmorland Antiquarian and Archaeological Society. 3. 11: 15–27. doi:10.5284/1064023.
- Webster, Leslie (2012). Anglo-Saxon art : a new history. London: The British Museum Press. pp. [1]–256. ISBN 9780714128092.
- Whaley, Diana (2006). A dictionary of Lake District place-names. Nottingham: English Place-Name Society. pp. ix, 423. ISBN 978-0904889727.
- Whalley, Neil (2018). "The Domesday Book of South Cumbria". Transactions of the Cumberland and Westmorland Antiquarian and Archaeological Society. 3. 18: 105–122. doi:10.5284/1084883.
- Wilson, R. J. A. (2004). "Introduction : the Roman frontier on the Solway". In Wilson, R. J. A.; Caruana, I. D. (eds.). Romans on the Solway : essays in honour of Richard Bellhouse. CWAAS Extra Series. Vol. 31. Kendal: Cumberland and Westmorland Antiquarian & Archaeological Society on behalf of the Trustees of the Senhouse Roman Museum, Maryport. pp. 1–231. ISBN 978-1873124390.
- Winchester, Angus J. L. (1985). "The multiple estate : a framework for the evolution of settlement in Anglo-Saxon and Scandinavian Cumbria". In Baldwin, J. R.; Whyte, I. D. (eds.). The Scandinavians in Cumbria. Edinburgh: Scottish Society for Northern Studies. pp. vi, 167, pp. 89–101. ISBN 978-0950599427.
- Winchester, Angus J. L. (2005). "Regional identity in the Lake Counties : land tenure and the Cumbrian landscape". Northern History. 42: 29–48. doi:10.1179/174587005x38408. S2CID 162048470.
- Wordsworth, William (1926). Wordsworth's Guide to the lakes (5th edition (1835), with an introduction, appendices, and notes textual and illustrative by Ernest de Selincourt ed.). London: Humphrey Milford. pp. xxxii, 203.
- Wordsworth, William (1977). Guide to the Lakes :the 5th edition (1835): with an introduction, appendices, and notes textual and illustrative by Ernest de Sélincourt. Oxford: Oxford University Press. pp. xxxii, 212. ISBN 978-0192812193.
- Wymer, J. J. (1981). "The Paleolithic". In Simmons, I.; Tooley, M. J. (eds.). The environment in British prehistory. London: Duckworth. pp. 49–81.
