= 50s =

Sixth decade of the first century AD

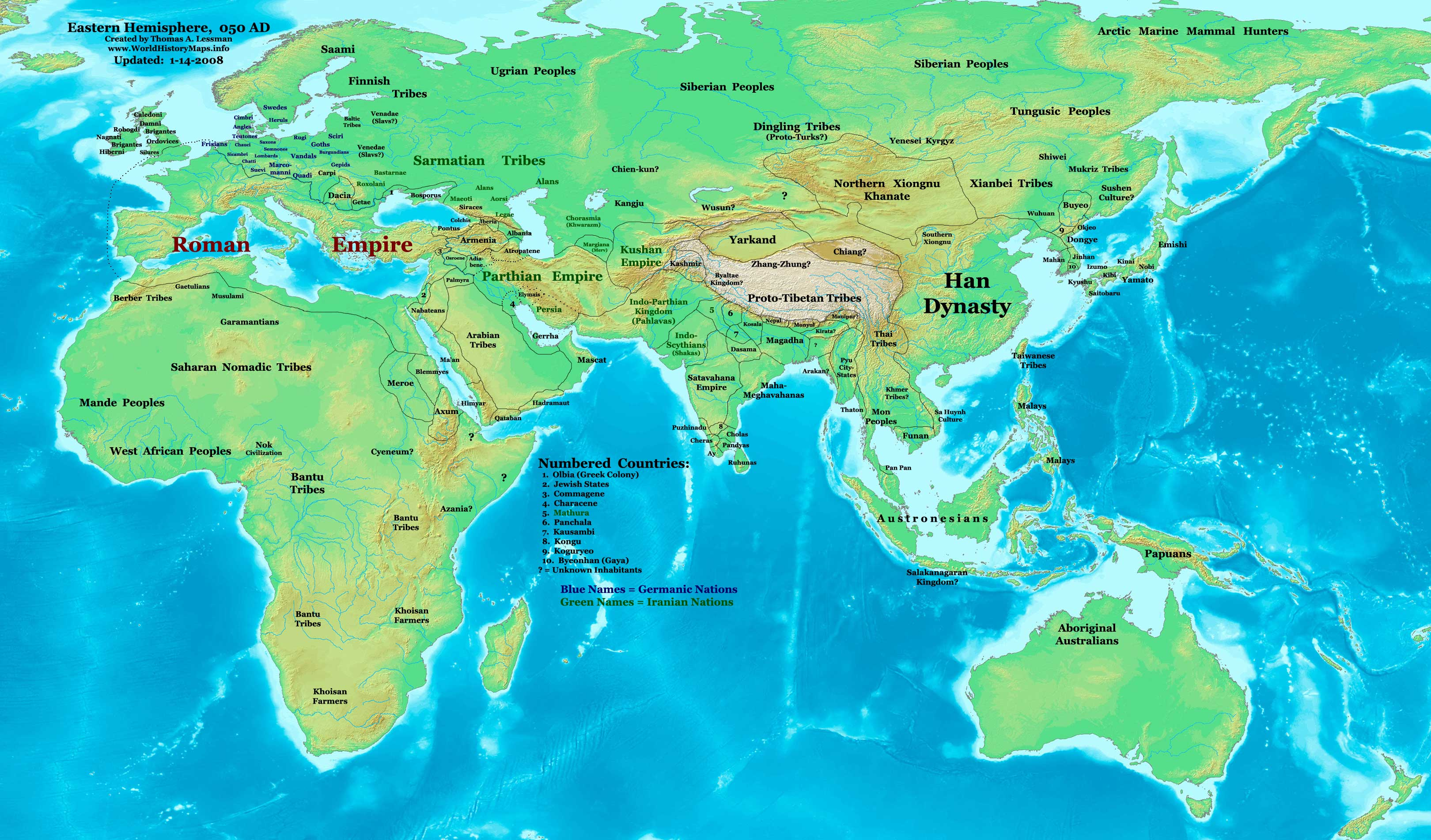
Eastern Hemisphere in AD 50.

The 50s decade ran from January 1, 50, to December 31, 59. It was the sixth decade in the Anno Domini/Common Era, if the nine-year period from 1 AD to 9 AD is considered as a "decade".

The early years of the decade saw Roman and Parthian intervention in the Iberian–Armenian War, a conflict which led Tiridates I to become King of Armenia with Parthian support. This was unacceptable to Rome, and the ensuing tensions culminated in the Roman–Parthian War of 58–63. Concurrently, the Roman conquest of Britain continued, with Caratacus being defeated in 50 and tribes of modern Wales being subdued in 58 to 59. In 50, the Southern Xiongnu submitted to the Chinese Han dynasty. Later in 57, the ascension of Emperor Ming heralded the beginning of a golden age.

The Council of Jerusalem was held early in the decade: The council decided that Gentile converts to Christianity were not obligated to keep most of the fasts, and other specific rituals, including the rules concerning circumcision of males. The Council did, however, retain the prohibitions on eating blood, meat containing blood, and meat of animals that were strangled, and on fornication and idolatry.

Literary works of this decade include De Vita Beata (which explains that the pursuit of happiness is the pursuit of reason) and De Clementia (an instructional contrast between the good ruler and a tyrant), both of which were written by Seneca the Younger.

Manning (2008) tentatively estimates the world population in AD 50 as 248 million.

== Demographics ==
Due to lack of reliable demographic data, estimates of the world population in the 1st century vary wildly, with estimates for AD 1 varying from 150 to 300 million. Demographers typically do not attempt to estimate most specific years in antiquity, instead giving approximate numbers for round years such as AD 1 or AD 200. However, attempts at reconstructing the world population in more specific years have been made, with Manning (2008) tentatively estimating the world population in AD 50 as 248 million.

== Events ==
=== 50 AD ===
==== Roman Empire ====
- Cologne is raised to the status of a city.
- Utrecht is founded, and a Roman fortification (castellum) is constructed at the Rhine border in the present-day Netherlands.
- Claudius adopts Nero.
- Roman emperor Claudius appoints Agrippa II governor of Chalcis.

==== Palestine ====
- In Judaea, a Roman soldier seizes and burns a Torah scroll. Procurator Cumanus has the culprit beheaded, calming down local Jews and delaying for almost two decades the outbreak of their revolt.
- The Apostles hold the Council of Jerusalem (approximate date).

==== Greece ====
- Paul travels to Philippi, Thessaloniki, Beroea, and Athens (second missionary journey).
- The Epistle to the Romans is written (approximate date).
- Hero of Alexandria invents a steam turbine (possible date).
- Pamphilus of Alexandria writes a poetic lexicon.
- Pedanius Dioscorides describes the medical applications of plants in De Materia Medica.

==== Britain ====
- In Britain, governor Publius Ostorius Scapula begins his campaign against the recalcitrant Silures of south Wales, who are led by the former Catuvellaunian prince Caratacus. London (Londinium), Exeter (Isca Dumnoniorum), Tripontium (near modern Rugby) and the fort of Manduessedum (near modern Atherstone) are founded (approximate date).
- Romans build a wooden bridge across the Thames in the London area.

==== Nubia ====
- Christianity is introduced throughout Nubia by a high official of Queen Judith.

==== South Asia ====
- The Yuezhi tribes are united under the Kushan leader Kujula Kadphises, thus creating the Kushan Empire in Afghanistan and northern India (approximate date).

==== Americas ====
- The San Bartolo pyramid is completed around this time.

=== 51 AD ===
==== Roman Empire ====
- Emperor Claudius and future emperor Titus Flavius Vespasianus become Roman Consuls.
- Burrus, praetorian prefect (51–62 AD), charges Seneca with the education of Nero.

==== Britain ====
- In Britain, governor Publius Ostorius Scapula defeats Caratacus and the Silures in the territory of the Ordovices in central Wales. (Note: Oxford's The Kings and Queens of Britain—among others—date the battle as happening in AD 50.) Caratacus seeks sanctuary with Cartimandua, queen of the Brigantes in northern England, but she is a Roman ally and hands him over to Ostorius. Despite the defeat, the Silures continue to fight.
- The captured Caratacus is exhibited in chains in Claudius' triumph in Rome, but his dignified demeanour persuades the emperor to spare his life and allow his family to live free in the capital for a short period of time.

==== Parthia ====
- Vonones II dies a few months after he had ascended to the throne. His son Vologases I becomes the new Parthian king.

=== 52 AD ===
==== Roman Empire ====
- Emperor Claudius attempts to control the Fucine Lake by digging a 5.6 km tunnel through Monte Salviano, requiring 30,000 workers and eleven years.
- Claudius completes the Aqua Claudia and Anio Novus, two aqueduct projects started by Caligula.
- In Rome, a law prohibits the execution of old and crippled slaves.
- Barea Soranus is consul suffectus in Rome.
- Pliny the Elder writes his account of the German wars.

==== Palestine ====
- Ananias, a high priest in Jerusalem, is sent to Rome after being accused of violence.

==== Britain ====
- In Britain, governor Publius Ostorius Scapula dies while campaigning against the Silures of south Wales. Following his death, the Roman Second Legion are heavily defeated by the Silures. His replacement is Aulus Didius Gallus, who quells the rebellion and consolidates the gains the Romans have so far made, but does not seek new ones.

==== India ====
- Saint Thomas, one of the twelve disciples of Jesus, is believed to have landed in Kodungallur, India to preach the Gospel; the Syro-Malabar Catholic Church, the Malankara Mar Thoma Syrian Church, the Indian Orthodox Church, and the Assyrian Church of the East claim descent from him.

==== China ====
- The Yuejue Shu, the first known gazetteer of China, is written during the Han Dynasty.

=== 53 AD ===
==== Roman Empire ====
- Emperor Claudius removes Herod Agrippa II from the tetrarchy of Chalcis in Greece.
- Decimus Junius Silanus Torquatus and Quintus Haterius Antoninus become Roman consuls.
- Claudius secures a senatorial decree that gives jurisdiction in financial cases to imperial procurators. This marks a significant strengthening of imperial powers at the expense of the Senate.
- June 9 – Nero is adopted by Claudius as his son and marries his 14-year-old daughter Claudia Octavia.
- Claudius accepts Nero as his successor, to the detriment of Britannicus, his son by his first wife, Valeria Messalina.
- Seneca writes the tragedy Agamemnon, which he intends to be read as the last chapter of a trilogy including two of his other tragedies, Medea and Edipus.

==== Anatolia ====
- Paul the Apostle writes his epistle to the Galatians from Ephesus (approximate date).

==== Syria ====
- Evodius succeeds Saint Peter as Patriarch of Antioch.

==== Britain ====
- Cardiff is founded by Aulus Didius Gallus.

==== Caucasus ====
- Tiridates I, brother of Vologases I, comes to power in Armenia as an adversary of the Romans.

==== Korea ====
- Taejodae becomes ruler of the kingdom of Goguryeo.

=== 54 AD ===
==== Roman Empire ====
- October 13 – Emperor Claudius dies (possibly after being poisoned by Agrippina, his wife and niece), and is succeeded by Nero.
- Nero attempts to prohibit the gladiatorial games.

==== Anatolia ====
- Gnaeus Domitius Corbulo arrives in the East and takes up an assignment as governor of Asia, with a secret brief from Nero and his chief ministers, Seneca and Burrus, to return Armenia to the Roman Empire.
- Winter – Domitius Corbulo marches his legions (Legio VI Ferrata and Legio X) into the mountains of Cappadocia and makes camp. He gives the men a harsh training, twenty-five-mile marches and weapons drills.
- Patriarch Onesimus succeeds Stachys the Apostle as Patriarch of Constantinople.
- Apollos, a later assistant of Paul, is converted to Christianity in Ephesus.

==== Syrian ====
- Corbulo inspects a base of Legio X Fretensis in Syria, at Cyrrhus; the Roman legionaries are demoralized by a "long peace". Many soldiers sell their helmets and shields.
- Corbulo recruits Syrian auxiliary units in the region and stations them in border forts, with orders from Nero not to provoke the Parthians.

==== Palestine ====
- Palestine is returned piecemeal to Herod Agrippa's son Marcus Julius Agrippa between 48 and 54.
- Violence erupts in Caesarea regarding a local ordinance restricting the civil rights of Jews, creating clashes between Jews and pagans. The Roman garrison, made up of Syrians, takes the side of the pagans. The Jews, armed with clubs and swords, meet in the marketplace. The governor of Judea, Antonius Felix, orders his troops to charge. The violence continues and Felix asks Nero to arbitrate. Nero sides with the pagans, and relegates the Jews to second-class citizens.

==== Arabia ====
- Under Nero, Rome annexes Aden to protect the maritime route between Alexandria and Asia.

==== Britain ====
- In Britain, Venutius leads a revolt against his ex-wife Cartimandua, queen of the Brigantes and a Roman ally. Governor Aulus Didius Gallus sends her military aid, and after some indecisive fighting a legion commanded by Caesius Nasica defeats the rebels (approximate date – some time between 52 and 57).

==== Egypt ====
- Two centurions are sent to the south of Egypt to find the source of the Nile, and possible new provinces. They report that while there are many cities in the desert, the area seems too poor to be worthy of conquest.

=== 55 AD ===
==== Roman Empire ====
- Emperor Nero becomes a Roman Consul.
- The Roman jurist Sabinus writes three books on the rights of citizens.

==== Anatolia ====
- The apostle Paul writes his First Epistle to the Corinthians.

=== 56 AD ===
==== Roman Empire ====
- War between Rome and Parthia breaks out due to the invasion of Armenia by King Vologases I, who has replaced the Roman-supported ruler with his brother Tiridates I of Armenia. (approximate date)
- Publius Clodius Thrasea Paetus becomes a consul in Rome.

==== Greece ====
- The apostle Paul writes his second Epistle to the Corinthians, probably from Philippi.
- The apostle Paul writes his Epistle to the Romans, from Corinth (approximate date).

==== China ====
- The Jianwu era of the Eastern Han dynasty changes to the Jianwuzhongyuan era.

=== 57 AD ===
==== Roman Empire ====
- Envoys from Cilicia come to Rome to accuse their late governor, Cossutianus Capito, of extortion; the Roman Senate is supported in the case by Publius Clodius Thrasea Paetus.
- Emperor Nero becomes a Roman consul again.

==== Greece ====
- Paul of Tarsus writes his Second Epistle to the Corinthians and his Epistle to the Romans (probable date).

==== Britain ====
- Quintus Veranius Nepos becomes governor in place of Aulus Didius Gallus. He begins a campaign against the Silures of south Wales.

==== China ====
- Emperor Guang Wu grants Nakoku (located around modern-day Fukuoka City) a golden seal, being the oldest evidence of writing in Japan. In return King Na sends an envoy to China.
- March 29 – Guang Wu dies after a 32-year reign and is succeeded by his son Han Mingdi.

==== Korea ====
- Accession of King Talhae as Korean ruler of Silla.

=== 58 AD ===
==== Roman Empire ====
- Emperor Nero and Marcus Valerius Messalla Corvinus become Roman consuls.
- The friendship between Nero and Marcus Salvius Otho ends when they both fall in love with Poppea Sabina, and Otho is sent to Lusitania as governor.
- Agrippina the Younger is expelled from the imperial palace by her son Nero, who installs her in Villa Antonia in Misenum, and leaving more of the effective and real power of Empire in the hands of Nero.
- The Ficus Ruminalis begins to die (see Rumina).
- Agrippina the Younger, conspired with the senators in late 58 to overthrow Nero.

==== Palestine ====
- The apostle Paul returns to Jerusalem with the money he has collected to give the Christian community there. However, he is accused of defiling the temple, and is arrested and imprisoned in Caesarea. He then invokes his Roman citizenship and is sent to Rome to be judged.

==== Caucasus ====
- Roman-Parthian War: Gnaeus Domitius Corbulo, commander in the East, launches his Armenian offensive against Parthia. He leads a Roman army (four legions) through the mountainous country of Armenia, against the fortress at Volandum, to the southwest of Artaxata. After a siege of eight hours Corbulo takes the city; the legionnaires massacre the defenders and plunder Volandum to their hearts' content.
- Corbulo marches to Artaxata crossing the Aras River; along the valley he is shadowed by tens of thousands of mounted Parthian archers led by king Tiridates I. The city opens its gates to Corbulo, just as it had to Germanicus four decades before. When he takes the 250-year-old Armenian capital, Corbulo gives the residents a few hours to collect their valuables and burns the city to the ground.

==== Britain ====
- Gnaeus Julius Agricola, 18 years old, is serving as a military tribune in Britain under Gaius Suetonius Paulinus and is attached to Legio II Augusta.

==== Europe ====
- In Thuringia, conflict between two Germanic tribes erupts over access to water.
- Romans learn the use of soap from the Gauls (approximate date).

==== China ====
- Emperor Ming of Han introduces Buddhism to China inviting monks from the western Indus Valley.
- In China, sacrifices to Confucius are ordered in all government schools.
- Start of Yongping era of the Chinese Han dynasty.

=== 59 AD ===
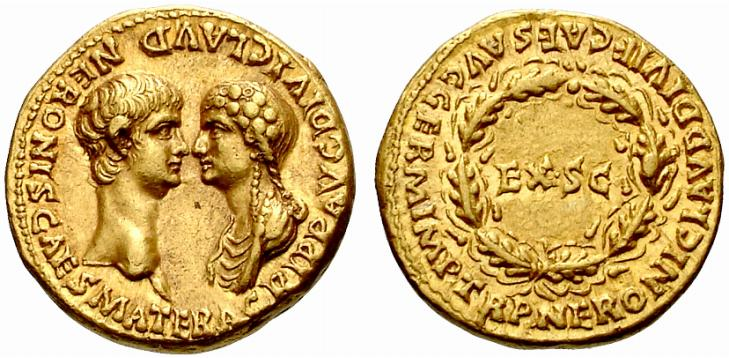
Coin of Nero and Agrippina the Younger

==== Roman Empire ====
- March 23 – Emperor Nero orders the murder of his mother Agrippina the Younger. He tries to kill her through a planned shipwreck, but when she survives, he has her executed and frames it as a suicide.
- Publius Clodius Thrasea Paetus retires from the Roman Senate. He openly shows his disgust at the behaviour of Nero regarding the murder of Agrippina.
- Rioting breaks out between the people of Pompeii and the people of Nuceria during a gladiator fight in Pompeii. Thousands are killed.
- In the Satyricon, Petronius pokes fun at Roman immorality.

==== Palestine ====
- Paul the Apostle pleads his case and testifies to his Christianity before King Agrippa II of the Herodians, who reportedly responds "You almost persuade me to be a Christian."

==== Caucasus ====
- Gnaeus Domitius Corbulo, Roman commander in the east, captures Tigranocerta in Mesopotamia. He installs Tigranes VI, a Cappadocian prince, as ruler of Armenia. For the next four years, a cohort from Legio VI Ferrata and Legio X Fretensis is stationed in the capital as bodyguard to the king, supported by fifteen hundred auxiliaries.

==== North Africa ====
- An eclipse on 30 April over North Africa is recorded by Pliny the Elder in his Natural History.

== Significant people ==
- Claudius, Roman Emperor (AD 41–54)
- Nero, Roman Emperor (AD 54–68)
- Kujula Kadphises, Kushan emperor
- Paul of Tarsus, Christian evangelist
- Emperor Ming of Han China

== Births ==
=== 50 AD ===
- Cai Lun, Chinese inventor of paper and the papermaking process (d. 121)

=== 53 AD ===
- (approximate year) Marcus Ulpius Traianus, Roman emperor (d. 117)
- Domitia Longina, Roman empress (approximate date)
- Kanishka I, Indian ruler of the Kushan Empire (d. 150)

=== 55 AD ===
- Epictetus, Greek-Roman philosopher (d. 135)

=== 56 AD ===
- Gaius Cornelius Tacitus, Roman historian.

=== 57 AD ===
- Han Zhang Di, Chinese emperor (d. AD 88)

=== 58 AD ===
- Juvenal, Roman poet and writer (approximate date)
- Xu Shen, Chinese politician and writer (approximate date)

== Deaths ==
=== 50 AD ===
- Abgar V, Roman client king of Osroene (approximate date)
- Aulus Cornelius Celsus, Roman author of De Medicina (b. c. 25 BC)
- Gamaliel the Elder, Jewish ruler (Nasi) in Babylonia (approximate date)
- Gaius Julius Phaedrus, Roman fabulist (b. c. 15 BC)
- Philo of Alexandria, Jewish philosopher (b. c. 20 BC)
- Scribonius Largus, Roman court physician (b. c. AD 1)

=== 51 AD ===
- Gotarzes II, king of the Parthian Empire
- Lucius Vitellius the Elder, Roman consul (b. 5 BC)
- Mithridates of Armenia, Roman client king
- Vonones II, king of the Parthian Empire

=== 52 AD ===
- Gamaliel, Jewish leader (nasi) (approximate date)
- Guo Shengtong, Chinese empress of the Han Dynasty
- Julia Iotapa, queen of Commagene (approximate date)
- Publius Ostorius Scapula, Roman statesman and general

=== 53 AD ===
- Mobon, Korean ruler of Goguryeo

=== 54 AD ===
- October 13 – Claudius, Roman emperor, possibly poisoned by his wife Agrippina (b. 10 BC)
- Ban Biao, Chinese historian and official (b. AD 3)
- Domitia Lepida the Younger, widow of Marcus Valerius Messalla Barbatus, mother of Valeria Messalina and former mother-in-law of Claudius (b. 10 BC)
- Gaius Stertinius Xenophon, Greek physician, possibly poisoned Claudius
- Marcus Junius Silanus, Roman consul (b. AD 14)
- Stachys the Apostle, Byzantine bishop and saint

=== 55 AD ===
- February 11 – Britannicus, son of Claudius (b. AD 41)
- Antonia Tryphaena, Roman client queen (b. 10 BC)
- Izates bar Monobaz, Parthian client king (b. c. AD 1)

=== 56 AD ===
- Lucius Volusius Saturninus, Roman politician and governor

=== 57 AD ===
- March 29 – Guang Wu, Chinese emperor (b. 5 BC)
- Quintus Veranius, Roman consul and general
- Yuri, Korean ruler of Silla

=== 58 AD ===
- Deng Yu, Chinese general of the Han dynasty (b. AD 2)
- Geng Yan, Chinese general of the Han dynasty (b. AD 3)
- Pharasmanes I, Roman client king of Iberia
- Rhadamistus, Roman client king of Armenia

=== 59 AD ===
- March 23 – Agrippina the Younger, mother of Nero (b. AD 15)
- Domitia Lepida the Elder, granddaughter of Mark Antony
- Gnaeus Domitius Afer, Roman politician and orator
- Servilius Nonianus, Roman consul and historian
