= 1st century in Roman Britain =

Events from the 1st century in Roman Britain.

== Events ==
- 7 CE
  - Cunobeline of the Catuvellauni defeats the Trinovantes, and establishes a capital at Colchester.
- 9
  - Cunobeline becomes king of the Catuvellauni.
- 39/40
  - A succession crisis erupts at Cunobelin's court and his exiled younger son Adminius flees to the court of Emperor Caligula in Rome.
- 40
  - Caligula plans an invasion of Britain but turns back before reaching the coast of Gaul.
- 42
  - Approximate date of the death of Cunobelin. His sons Caratacus and Togodumnus expand Catuvellauni territory into the Atrebates, driving out king Verica.
  - Verica travels to Rome to appeal to Emperor Claudius to help him regain his throne.
- 43
  - Roman conquest of Britain.
    - May – Aulus Plautius lands with four Roman legions (20,000 men) and the same number of auxiliaries at Rutupiae (probably modern Richborough) on the east coast of Kent. General (future emperor) Vespasian plays a major role in the defeat of the Britons led by the brothers Caratacus and Togodumnus (leaders of the Catuvellauni) in the 2-day Battle of the Medway (probably at the river near Rochester) and the Romans drive them back to and across the River Thames; Togodumnus dies soon after. Plautius halts at the Thames and sends for the Emperor.
    - September – Emperor Claudius, who arrives with reinforcements including war elephants, leads the march on Camulodunum (modern Colchester). Eleven British kings, probably including those of the Iceni and Brigantes, submit without a fight. Plautius becomes first Governor of Roman Britain.
    - The Romans capture a Brythonic settlement at Kent and rename it Durovernum Cantiacorum (modern Canterbury); and establish a Roman fort to guard the crossing of the Kentish River Stour.
    - Roman London (Londinium) is established on the Thames.
    - The Romans begin to construct forts, such as at Peterborough, and plan a road that later becomes Ermine Street.
    - Vespasian sets out to subdue the south-west.
  - Approximate date – Cartimandua becomes queen of the Brigantes.
- 44
  - Construction of Watling Street, Ermine Street, Stane Street, and Fosse Way begins.
  - Conquest of south-western Britain and the Isle of Wight begins; Vespasian captures the Dorset hill forts.
- 47
  - Aulus Plautius is received as a hero in Rome.
  - Roman allies the Iceni of East Anglia are ordered to surrender their weapons by new Roman Governor of Britain Ostorius Scapula. Some tribesmen resist and are quickly put down. Prasutagus takes over as king of the Iceni at about this time.
- 48
  - Romans defeat the Deceangli tribes of north-eastern Wales.
- 49
  - Silures tribes of southern Wales attack the Romans, but are held back by newly constructed forts.
  - Roman citizen-colony is founded at Camulodunum (Colchester).
- 51
  - Caratacus leads the Ordovices of north-western Wales against the Romans, but is defeated and captured.
  - Foundation of Verulamium (St Albans).
- 52
  - Governor Aulus Didius Gallus builds a legionary base at Wroxeter.
- 58
  - Governor Gaius Suetonius Paulinus launches an invasion of Wales.
- 60 or 61
  - Paulinus captures Anglesey, the last stronghold of the druids.
  - Prasutagus, king of the Iceni (in modern East Anglia), dies leaving a will which passes his kingdom to his two daughters and emperor Nero. The Roman army however annexes the kingdom as if conquered, depriving the nobles of their hereditary lands and plundering the land. The king's widow, Boudica, is flogged and forced to watch their daughters publicly raped. Roman financiers, including Seneca the Younger, call in their loans.
  - Boudica leads a rebellion of the Iceni against Roman rule in alliance with the Trinovantes, Cornovii, Durotriges and Celtic Britons. The Iceni and Trinovantes first destroy the Roman capital Camulodunum (Colchester), wipe out the infantry of the Legio IX Hispana (commanded by Quintus Petillius Cerialis) and go on to burn Londinium (London) (probably destroying London Bridge) and Verulamium (St Albans), in all cases massacring the inhabitants in thousands.
  - Paulinus defeats the rebels at the Battle of Watling Street using a flying wedge formation, and imposes wide-ranging punishments on native Britons, but is removed from office after an enquiry instituted by Gaius Julius Alpinus Classicianus (appointed procurator 61) and the Romanization of Britain continues. Boudica either poisons herself or falls sick and dies.
- 68
  - Governor Marcus Vettius Bolanus unsuccessfully attacks the lands of the Brigantes.
- 69 (Year of the Four Emperors)
  - Cartimandua, queen of the Brigantes, is forced to abandon her kingdom to her ex-husband Venutius who is again in revolt against Rome.
- 71
  - Governor Quintus Petillius Cerialis conquers the Parisii and Brigantes tribes of the north-east.
- 74
  - Governor Sextus Julius Frontinus completes the conquest of the Silures and constructs a fort at Caerleon.
- 78
  - General (later Governor) Gnaeus Julius Agricola completes the conquest of the Ordovices.
- 79
  - Legionary fortress constructed at Deva Victrix (Chester); subjugation of north-west completed.
  - Grand opening of civic centre in St Albans.
  - Local aristocrats are encouraged to abandon ancient British culture.
- 80
  - Agricola advances to the River Tay, and fortifies Carlisle and Corstopitum.
- 82
  - Agricola subdues and occupies Galloway.
- 83
  - Roman army campaigns against the Caledonii tribes of the north and constructs a base at Inchtuthil.
- 84
  - Battle of Mons Graupius: Romans defeat the Caledonii, and advance to the Moray Firth.
- 85
  - Agricola recalled to Rome.
  - Construction of Dere Street and Stanegate begins.
