= History of Yorkshire =

Yorkshire is a historic county of England, centred on the county town of York. The region was first occupied after the retreat of the ice age around 8000 BC. During the first millennium AD it was inhabited by celtic Britons and occupied by Romans, Angles and Vikings. The name comes from "Eborakon" (c. 150) an old Brythonic name which probably derives from "Efor" or "the place of the yew-trees." Many Yorkshire dialect words and aspects of pronunciation derive from old Norse due to the Viking influence in this region. The name "Yorkshire", first appeared in writing in the Anglo-Saxon Chronicle in 1065. It was originally composed of three sections called Thrydings, subsequently referred to as Ridings.

Following the Norman Conquest of England in 1066, Yorkshire was subject to the punitive harrying of the North, which caused great hardship. The Harrying was one of the first genocides recorded in world history and was carried out by the Norman conquerors on the native Britons, Norse, and Anglo-Scandinavians. The area proved to be notable for uprisings and rebellions throughout the Tudor period. During the Industrial Revolution, the West Riding became the second most important manufacturing area in the United Kingdom, while the predominant industries of the East and North Ridings remained fishing and agriculture. In modern times, the Yorkshire economy suffered from a decline in manufacturing which affected its traditional coal, steel, wool and shipping industries.

== Geographical context ==
Yorkshire’s towns and cities of historic note
Ancient administrative – Red.
Religious – Purple. Elder administrative – Blue.

Yorkshire was not a homogeneous natural or topographical area and the contrasting conditions and natural resources led to differences in the way that the different areas of the county developed over time. These differences manifested themselves in contrasting economic developments as well as the styles of the vernacular architecture of the various areas. The North York Moors area is even now very different from the South Yorkshire Coalfield area of West Riding and this differs greatly from Holderness.

In Yorkshire there is a very close relationship between the major topographical areas and the underlying geology. The Pennine chain of hills in the west is of Carboniferous origin. The central vale is Permo-Triassic. The North York Moors in the north-east of the county are Jurassic in age while the Yorkshire Wolds to the south east are Cretaceous chalk uplands.

The region is drained by several rivers. In eastern and central Yorkshire the many rivers empty their waters into the River Ouse which reaches the North Sea via the Humber Estuary.

The most northerly of the rivers in the Ouse system is the Swale, which drains Swaledale before passing through Richmond and meandering across the Vale of Mowbray. Next, draining Wensleydale, is the River Ure, which joins the Swale east of Boroughbridge. The River Nidd rises on the edge of the Yorkshire Dales National Park and flows along Nidderdale before reaching the Vale of York.

The Ouse is the name given to the river after its confluence with the Ure at Ouse Gill Beck. The River Wharfe, which drains Wharfedale, joins the Ouse upstream of Cawood. The Rivers Aire and Calder are more southerly contributors to the River Ouse and the most southerly Yorkshire tributary is the River Don, which flows northwards to join the main river at Goole. In the far north of the county the River Tees flows eastwards through Teesdale and empties its waters into the North Sea downstream of Middlesbrough. The smaller River Esk flows from west to east at the northern foot of the North York Moors to reach the sea at Whitby.

The River Derwent rises on the North York Moors, flows south then westwards through the Vale of Pickering then turns south again to drain the eastern part of the Vale of York. It empties into the River Ouse at Barmby on the Marsh. To the east of the Yorkshire Wolds the River Hull flows southwards to join the Humber Estuary at Kingston upon Hull. The western Pennines are served by the River Ribble which drains westwards into the Irish Sea close to Lytham St Anne's.

== Prehistory ==
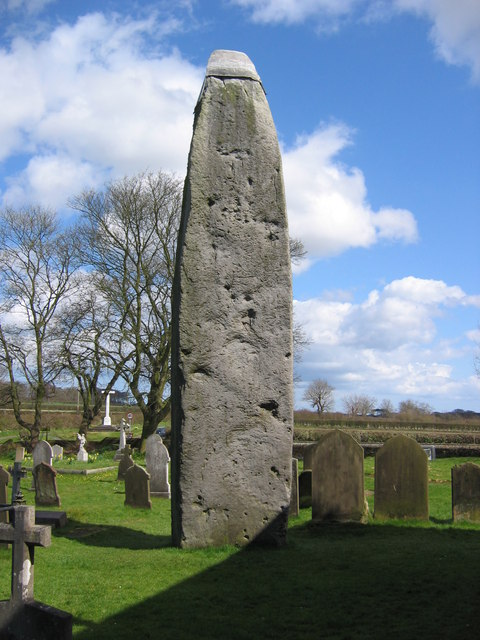
The Rudston Monolith, almost 26ft high, close to Rudston Parish Church of all Saints

This refers to the period up to the arrival of the Romans, c. 71 AD in this area. The appearance of the terrain differed greatly from that which exists today. During the early part of this period there was a land connection between what is now Germany and eastern England, making it possible for groups of hunters to wander into the area. When the first people arrived the climate would have been sub arctic and the animals that the Paleolithic groups found would have been included the mammoth, woolly rhinoceros and reindeer. Though the cliffs at Creswell Crags in neighbouring North East Derbyshire contain several caves that were occupied during the last ice age, between around 43,000 and 10,000 years ago, evidence of human activity in Yorkshire itself is, so far, restricted to that revolving around a hunter gatherer lifestyle dating from around 8000/7000 BC. In Victoria Cave, Settle, late upper palaeolithic projectile points were found that include the bone head of a harpoon which was dated to within 110 years of 8270 BC.

During the 5,000 years following the arrival of the first migrants the climate improved steadily and a richer natural vegetation started to cover the land including birch, hazel, elm, pine and oak trees. By 5000 BC Britain was separated from mainland Europe after rising sea levels had created the southern area of the North Sea. Chapel Cave, near Malham in the northern Pennines, may have been used as a hunting lookout during the Mesolithic period. Trapezoidal microliths used in wooden shafts as arrows were found in the collection of flint when the cave was excavated. Animal bones which were found there included hare, fox, roe deer, badger and a large bird. Fish scales, particularly perch, were also found. Further south, the Marsden area of the Pennines also became a seasonal hunting ground for early humans in the Mesolithic period. There were seasonal hunting encampments on the high ground by 7000 BC. Stone Age tools have been found at Pule Hill, Warcock Hill, Standedge and March Hill.

On the North York Moors relics of this early hunting, gathering and fishing community have been found as a widespread scattering of flint tools and the barbed flint flakes used in arrows and spears. The earliest known evidence of human presence in the area of the Vale of Pickering dates back to the Mesolithic period, around 7000 BC The most important remaining settlement of this period is that at Star Carr near Scarborough, where, due to waterlogged conditions, a considerable quantity of organic remains as well as flint tools, have survived. This is Britain's best-known Mesolithic site. The site, on the eastern shores of glacial Lake Pickering, was surrounded by birch trees, some of which had been cleared and used to construct a rough platform of branches and brushwood. Lumps of turf and stones had been thrown on top of this construction to make a village site. The site was probably visited from time to time by about four or five families who were engaged in hunting, fishing and gathering wild plants as well as manufacturing tools and weapons and working skins for clothes.

On the southern edge of the Vale of Pickering lies West Heslerton, where recent excavation has revealed continuous habitation since the Late Mesolithic Age, about 5000 BC. This site has revealed a great deal of dwelling and occupation evidence from the Neolithic period to the present day. Around 3000 BC arable farming and the domestication of animals started in the area. Permanent settlements were built by the Neolithic people and their culture involved ceremonial burials of their dead in barrows. The development of farming in the Vale of Pickering during the Neolithic period is evident in the distribution of earth long barrows throughout the area. These early farmers were the first to destroy the forest cover of the North York Moors. Their settlements were concentrated in the fertile parts of the limestone belt and these areas have been continuously farmed ever since. The Neolithic farmers of the moors grew crops, kept animals, made pottery and were highly skilled at making stone implements. They buried their dead in the characteristic long low burial mounds on the moors.

The historic landscape of the Great Wold Valley provides an insight into the activities of prehistoric peoples in the Yorkshire Wolds. The valley was an important place of worship in prehistoric times and it houses a number of important scheduled monuments dating back to Neolithic times. Rudston is the centre of a prehistoric landscape and four Neolithic cursus converge on the village area. Argham Dyke, a prehistoric earthwork dating from the Bronze Age, crosses the area near Rudston. There is also evidence of Iron Age occupation as revealed by aerial photographs showing traces of fields, trackways and farms. The Rudston Monolith at over 25 feet (7.6 metres) is the tallest megalith or Standing stone in the United Kingdom. It is situated in the churchyard in the village of Rudston in the East Riding of Yorkshire and is made from moor grit conglomerate, a material that can be found in the Cleveland Hills inland from Whitby. It dates from the Late Neolithic Period.

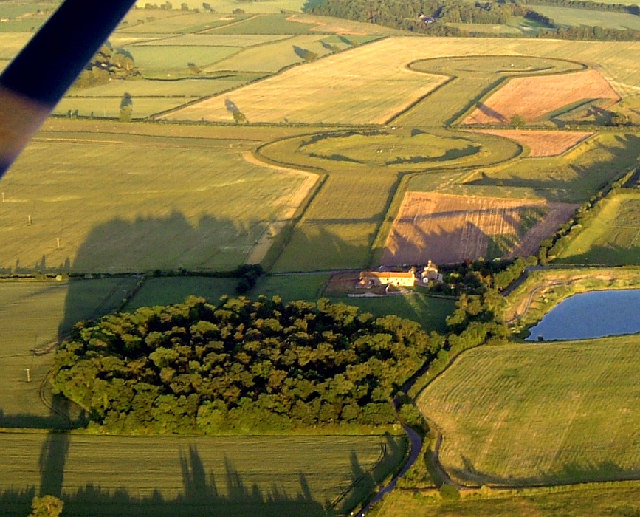
Thornborough Henge

The Thornborough Henges is an ancient monument complex that includes three aligned henges that give the site its name. The complex is located near the village of Thornborough, close to the town of Masham in North Yorkshire. The complex includes many large ancient structures including a cursus, henges, burial grounds and settlements. They are thought to have been part of a Neolithic and Bronze Age 'ritual landscape' comparable with Salisbury Plain and date from between 3500 and 2500 BC. This monument complex has been called 'The Stonehenge of the North' and has been described by English Heritage as the most important ancient site between Stonehenge and the Orkney Islands. There is a dearth of evidence of human occupation in the Vale of York until the early Bronze Age around 2300 BC, when the inhabitants of the Yorkshire region began to use implements made of bronze. The metal was refined from ore and hammered or cast to shape.

As the Neolithic period gave way to the Bronze Age in the area, people continued to farm, clear forest and use stone tools. They also continued to hunt in the upland areas as finds of their barbed and tanged flint arrowheads show. Only gradually did metal tools and weapons become adopted. The Bronze Age was a time of major changes in burial rituals. The bodies were buried beneath circular mounds of earth which are called round barrows and they are often accompanied by bronze artefacts. The great majority of known barrows are in prominent upland locations such as the Wolds, Moors and Pennine areas of Yorkshire, but some Bronze Age remains have been found on the fringe of the Vale of Pickering and there are a very few in the Vale of York. During the early Bronze Age, barrow burials were performed on the site of Ferrybridge Henge. The Street House Long Barrow at Loftus on the Cleveland coastline between Saltburn and Staithes was a Bronze Age mound that had been erected on top of a much earlier burial monument dating from the Neolithic period.

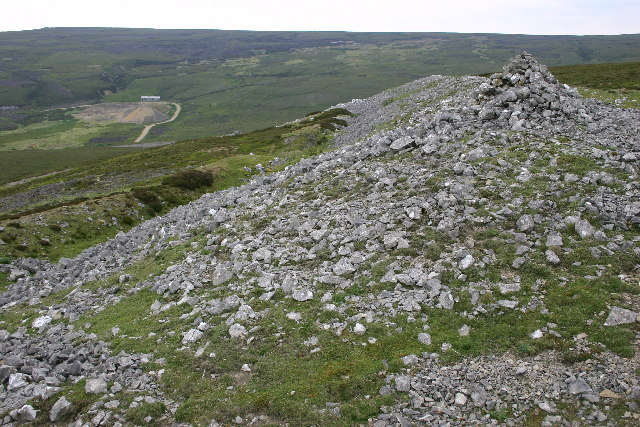
A prehistoric settlement on Harkerside Moor in Swaledale.

The Iron Age started around 700 BC in this area. There was a continuation and development of settlement patterns which originated in the Bronze Age. Heavily defended settlements on coastal and inland promontories were established. In East Yorkshire a new burial rite in which the dead were buried within square ditched barrows, and sometimes accompanied by grave goods including carts or chariots, appears from about 500 BC. This is the Arras culture of the Parisii tribe. Before their invasion the Romans identified three different tribes of people living in the Yorkshire area. The area now covered by Yorkshire was mostly the territory of the Brigantes, a Celtic tribe who lived between Tyne and Humber. Another tribe, the Parisii, inhabited what would become the East Riding. The Carvetii occupied an area of what is now called Cumbria, but was at the time of the Domesday Book still part of Yorkshire. Life was centred on agriculture, wheat and barley as the staple foods. The Brigantes lived in small villages, and raised cattle, sheep, goats, pigs and horses.

Fortifications were constructed in Brigantia and notable forts can still be discerned on Ingleborough and at Wincobank, amongst other places. Stanwick seems to have been the tribal capital of the Brigantes up until the Roman conquest.

In 2017 the remains of a horse and chariot were found in Pocklington.

In March 2021, archaeologists announced the discovery of an almost 6,000 year-old salt-making complex at a Neolithic site near the Boulby Cliffs in Yorkshire. Researchers revealed three salt-making kilns and fragments of dozens of ceramic bowls used in the process. According to Dr Stephen Sherlock, this discovery plays a pivotal role in understanding the main aspects of the Neolithic economy. As there is no local source of rock salt, it is probable that the salt was produced by evaporation or sea water.

== Roman ==
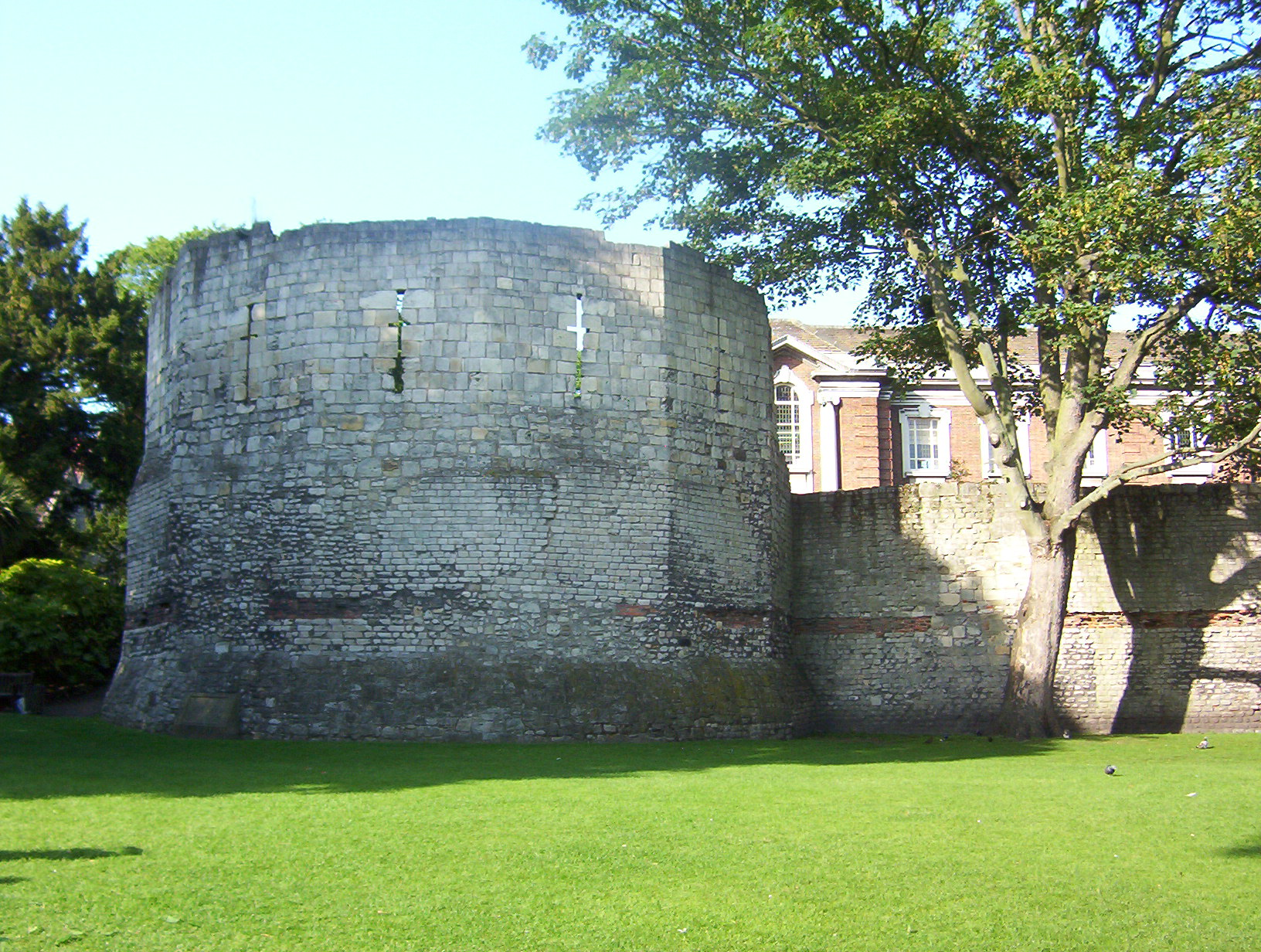
Roman wall and the west corner tower of the fort at York, with medieval additions

Roman Britain refers to those parts of the island of Great Britain controlled by the Roman Empire between 43 and 410 AD.

Yorkshire was effectively part of the Roman Empire from 71 AD to about 410 AD. Initially, Roman advances in Britain stopped at the River Don, the southern boundary of the Brigantian territory. The Templeborough area of Rotherham, just south of the Don, takes its name from the remains of the Roman fort found here. This was first built in wood c. 55 AD, and was later rebuilt in stone. Queen Cartimandua, the last ruler of the Brigantes, depended on Roman support to withstand the forces of her estranged husband, Venutius. The territory remained independent until 69 AD, when the Ninth Legion under Quintus Petillius Cerialis moved in to quell civil war between Cartimandua and Venutius, bringing an end to British rule in England. A fort at Danum (Doncaster), at a crossing over the River Don was built around 71 AD. The Romans advanced along the road that ran along the Wolds from Lindum Colonia (Lincoln) and then crossed the Humber to land at Petuaria, (Brough). This was the capital settlement of the Parisii tribe.

The advancing Romans built roads northwards through the northern terrain to Eboracum (York), Derventio (Malton) and Isurium Brigantum (Aldborough) then onwards to Cataractonium (Catterick). Piercebridge in the Tees lowlands is the site of the fortified river crossing where Dere Street crossed the River Tees. York was founded in 71 AD as Eboracum, the Roman capital of Northern Britain and a fort was established there. There were still large areas of ill drained lowlands so the main routeways and settlements were built on higher ground on the Wolds and the edges of Holderness, the Vale of Pickering and the central Vales of Mowbray and York. The site of York and its access routes took advantage of the higher ground of the York moraine which crosses the vale from west to east.

Roman Britain

Within a few years of defeating the Brigantian tribe at Stanwick in 74 AD the Romans had discovered and were smelting lead at Greenhow, in Nidderdale, in the Pennines as evidenced by inscribed pigs of lead found in the area. Beside the economic benefits of occupying and exploiting the raw materials of this northern region of Britain there were military reasons. The warlike Picts and Scots were kept at bay by stationing the Roman IX Legion in the area and most of the Roman settlements north of the Humber were military stations. The Romans built military settlements in the Pennines at Olicana (Ilkley), Castleshaw and Slack, which were maintained to stop insurrections by the Brigantians, and temporary Roman military camps on the North York Moors at Cawthorne and Goathland. There were, however, clusters of Roman villas around Derventio, Petuaria and in the area around present day Bridlington. A line of signal stations, one of which is located at Castle Hill, Scarborough, was built along the North Yorkshire coast warn of the approach of shipping.

In the 2nd century Hadrians Wall was completed from the River Tyne to the shore of the Solway Firth and the military threat lessened so more civilian settlements grew to the south of the wall. In the early 3rd century York was granted the honorary rank of a Roman colony and Isurium Brigantum expanded to become the largest civilian settlement in the area. Around this time York became the Roman military capital of northern Britain, Britannia Inferior, following the province being split. When Britannia was further divided in 296, York remained the administrative centre of Britannia Secunda. Constantine the Great was crowned Roman Emperor here in 306 and it would be he who would institute Roman Christendom.

In 402 AD the Roman garrison was recalled from York because of military threats in other parts of the Roman empire. Their most abiding legacy in this area is the road system which they left behind. Many modern main roads in Yorkshire, including parts of the A1, A59, A166 and A1079, still follow the routes of Roman roads.

== Sub-Roman ==
At the end of Roman rule in the 5th century, Northern Britain may have come under the rule of Romano-British Coel Hen, the last of the Roman-style Duces Brittanniarum (Dukes of the Britons). However, the Romano-British kingdom rapidly broke up into smaller kingdoms and York became the capital of the British kingdom of Ebrauc. Most of what became Yorkshire fell under the rule of the kingdom of Ebrauc but Yorkshire also included territory in the kingdoms of Elmet and an unnamed region ruled by Dunod Fawr, which formed at around this time as did Craven.

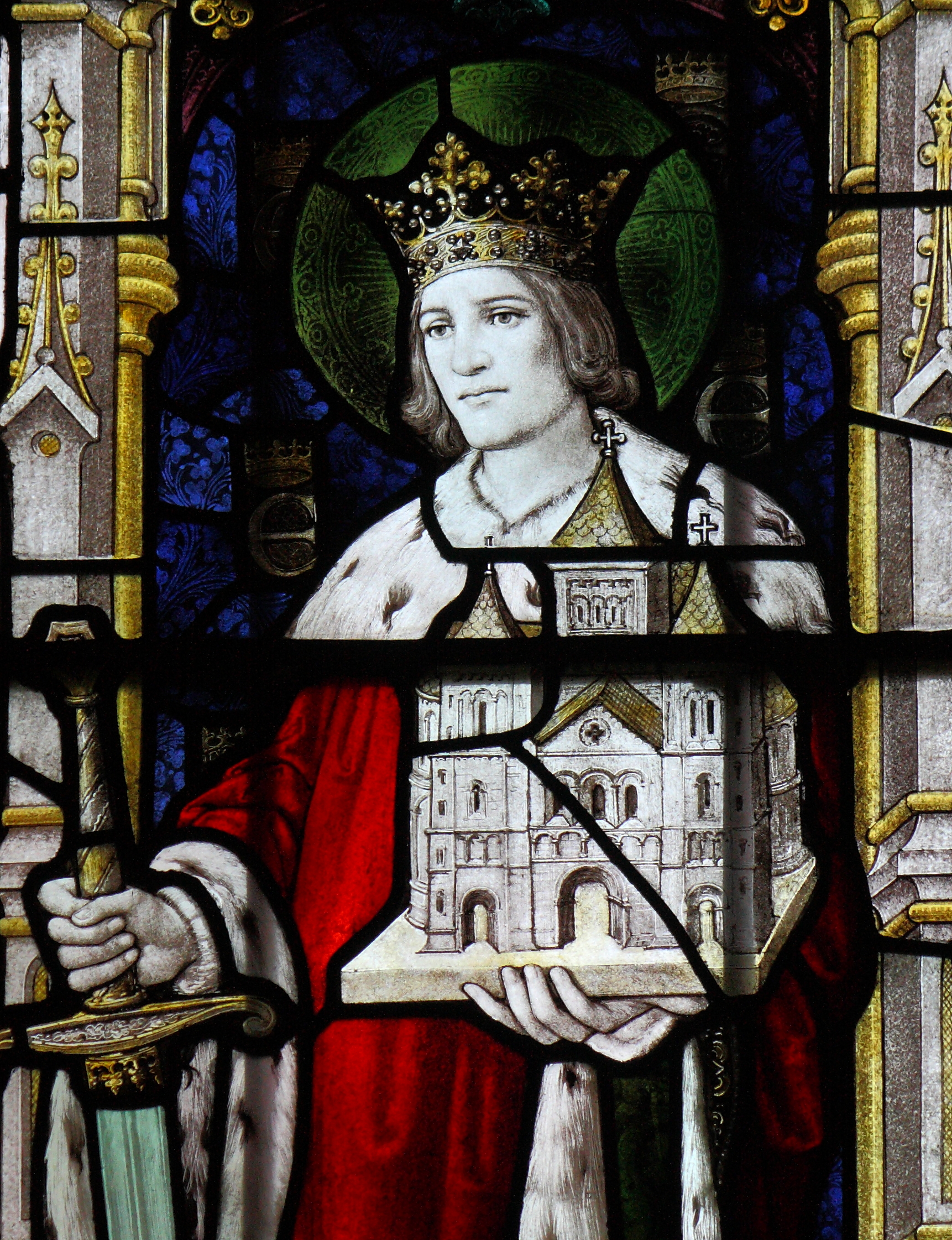
Depiction of Edwin of Northumbria from Sledmere

In the late 5th century and early 6th century Angles from the Schleswig-Holstein peninsula began colonising the Wolds, North Sea and Humber coastal areas. This was followed by the subjugation of the whole of east Yorkshire and the British kingdom of Ebruac in about 560. The name the Angles gave to the territory was Dewyr, or Deira. Early rulers of Deira extended the territory north to the River Wear and about 600, Æthelfrith was able to unite Deira with the northern kingdom of Bernicia, forming the kingdom of Northumbria, whose capital was at Eoforwic, modern day York. A later ruler, Edwin of Northumbria completed the conquest of the area by his conquest of the kingdom of Elmet, including Hallamshire and Leeds, in 617. He converted to the Christian religion, along with his nobles and many of his subjects, in 627 and was baptised at Eoforwic. His defeat at the Battle of Hatfield Chase by Penda of Mercia in 633 was followed by continuing struggles between Mercia and Northumbria for supremacy over Deira. Edwin's successor, Oswald, was sympathetic to the Celtic church and around 634 he invited Aidan from Iona to found a monastery at Lindisfarne as a base for converting Northumbria to Celtic Christianity. Aidan soon established a monastery on the cliffs above Whitby with Hilda as abbess. Further monastic sites were established at Hackness and Lastingham and Celtic Christianity became more influential in Northumbria than the Roman system. This caused conflict within the church until the issue was resolved at the Synod of Whitby in 663 by Oswiu of Northumbria opting to adopt the Roman system.

For the kingdom of Northumbria the Viking era opened in 793 with an attack on the monastery at Lindisfarne. Danish Vikings crossed the North Sea to plunder the coast of Northumbria whilst Norwegians raided Orkney, the Western Isles and Ireland. Yngling King Ragnar Lodbrok led a Danish Leidang into Northumbria during the mid-9th century, but was captured and executed in a snake pit at the Anglian court. The Danes embarked on a mission of vengeance, but were also part of the greater Scandinavian imperialist movement. In 865 his eldest son Ivar the Boneless led younger sons in control of the army into landing at East Anglia, where they slew King Edmund the Martyr. After their landing in East Anglia, the Danes headed north and took York in 866, eventually conquering the whole of Northumbria and Kingdom of Strathclyde.

== Early Middle Ages ==
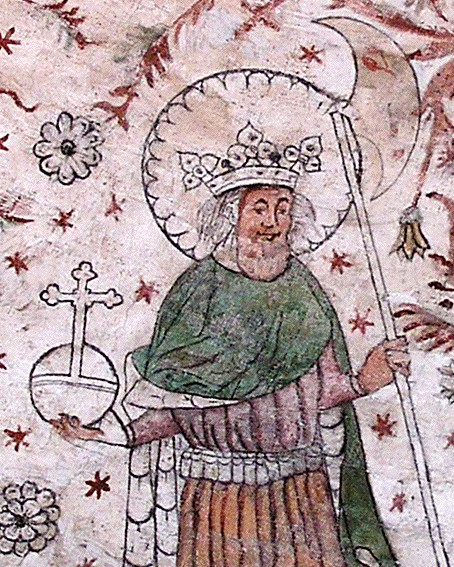
A medieval representation of Saint Olaf

After the Danish subjugation of the region, in 875 Guthrum became leader of the Danes and he apportioned lands to his followers; however, most of the English population were allowed to retain their lands under the lordship of their Scandinavian conquerors. Ivar the Boneless became "King of all Scandinavians in the British Isles". The Norse changed the Celtic Briton Cumbric name for York from Eoforwic, to Jorvik. The Vikings destroyed all the early monasteries in the area and took the monastic estates for themselves. Some of the minster churches survived the plundering and eventually the Danish leaders were converted to Christianity. In the late 9th century Jorvik was ruled by the Christian king Guthfrith. It was under the Danes that the ridings and wapentakes of Yorkshire and the Five Burghs were established. The ridings were arranged so that their boundaries met at Jorvik, which was the administrative and commercial centre of the region. The Swedish Munsö dynasty became overlords of Jorvik because the Danes in Britain had promised loyalty to the Munsö Kings of Dublin, but this dynasty was focused on the Baltic Sea economy and quarrelled with the native Danish Jelling dynasty (which originated in the Danelaw with Guthrum). The Norse-Gaels, Ostmen or Gallgaidhill became Kings of Jorvik after long contests with the Danes over controlling the Isle of Man, which prompted the Battle of Brunanburh. Then, in 954, King Eric I of Norway of the Fairhair dynasty was slain at the Battle of Stainmore by Anglo-Saxons and Edred of England began overlordship.

Jorvik was the direct predecessor to the shire of York and received further Danish royal aids after the invasion and takeover of Jorvik by England, from the Munsö descendants, Sweyn II of Denmark right down to Canute IV of Denmark's martyrdom. Saint Olave's Church in York is a testament to the Norwegian influence in the area.

== Middle Ages ==
In 1066, after the death of King Edward the Confessor, Yorkshire became the stage for two major battles that would help decide who would succeed to the throne. Harold Godwinson was declared King by the English but this was disputed by Harald Hardrada King of Norway and William Duke of Normandy. In the late summer of 1066 Harald Hardrada, accompanied by Tostig Godwinson, took a large Norwegian fleet and army up the Humber towards York. They were met by the army of the northern earls Edwin of Mercia and Morcar of Northumbria who they defeated at the Battle of Fulford. Harald Hardrada occupied York and the Norwegian Army encamped at Stamford Bridge. Harold Godwinson had to travel from London gathering his army as he went to face the invasion. Within five days, on 25 September 1066, Harold Godwinson had reached Stamford Bridge and defeated the Norwegian Army in a battle in which both Harald Hardrada and Tostig Godwinson were killed. The battle at Stamford Bridge can be seen as one of the pivotal battles in English history, it was the last time a Scandinavian army was able to seriously threaten England. On 28 September William Duke of Normandy landed on the south coast of England forcing Harold Godwinson to rush south from Yorkshire with his army. They met at the Battle of Hastings where the English army was defeated and Harold Godwinson killed, allowing William to become King of England.

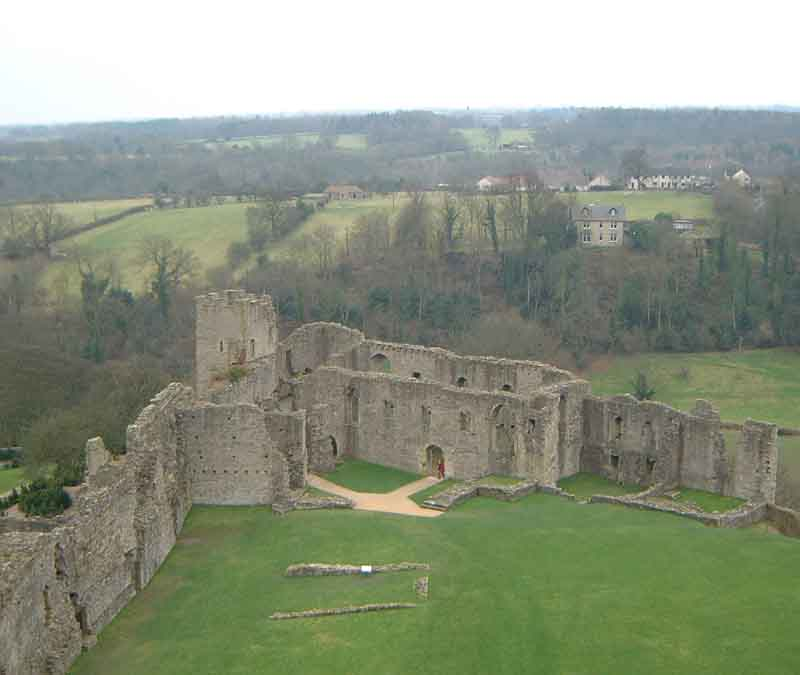
Richmond castle walls and towers seen from the Keep

King William I and the Normans did not immediately gain control over the whole of the country, and rebellions in the north of England, including Yorkshire, led to the Harrying of the North. The Anglo-Norman chronicler Orderic Vitalis condemned William the Conqueror for his cruelty in conducting a scorched earth campaign during the winter of 1069–70. Those who escaped initially hid in Yorkshire's woodland but many (some sources say 100,000) then died of famine or exposure when William salted the ground so nothing would grow. By 1071 the last native-led rebellion against Norman authority in Yorkshire had been suppressed. The severity of the Norman campaign is shown by the fall of land values in Yorkshire by two-thirds between 1069 and 1086. Domesday Book records that 25 continental magnates introduced into Yorkshire by the Conqueror held over 90% of the county's manors. The families who had previously held land were either deprived of their holdings or reduced to subtenants. Scholarship on the "harrying" does contain some dissent from this history. For instance the use of land value data does not confirm a specific policy of harrying. The difficulty experienced by kings administering the North compared to the South, produces a slanted view of land values and Domesday information.

In the early years of Norman rule the new rulers built ringwork castles. These were circular defensive enclosures formed by the construction of a bank and a ditch. Examples of which are Kippax, near Leeds and Castleton on the North York Moors. Yorkshire at this time was frontier country. It was vulnerable to attack from the north by the Scots and from across the North Sea by the Danes. Soon more complex motte and bailey castles were being built as the ruthless and ambitious barons appointed by King William to rule Yorkshire gained a hold on their territories. The parcels of land bestowed by William to his followers in Yorkshire were fewer and much larger than in more southern counties. Each was able to support a sizeable garrison in a strong castle. Large castles were established at Conisbrough, Tickhill, Pontefract, Richmond, Middleham and Skipsea and two in York. At this time also was established the chain of castles across the southern edge of the North York Moors which included Scarborough, Pickering and Helmsley.

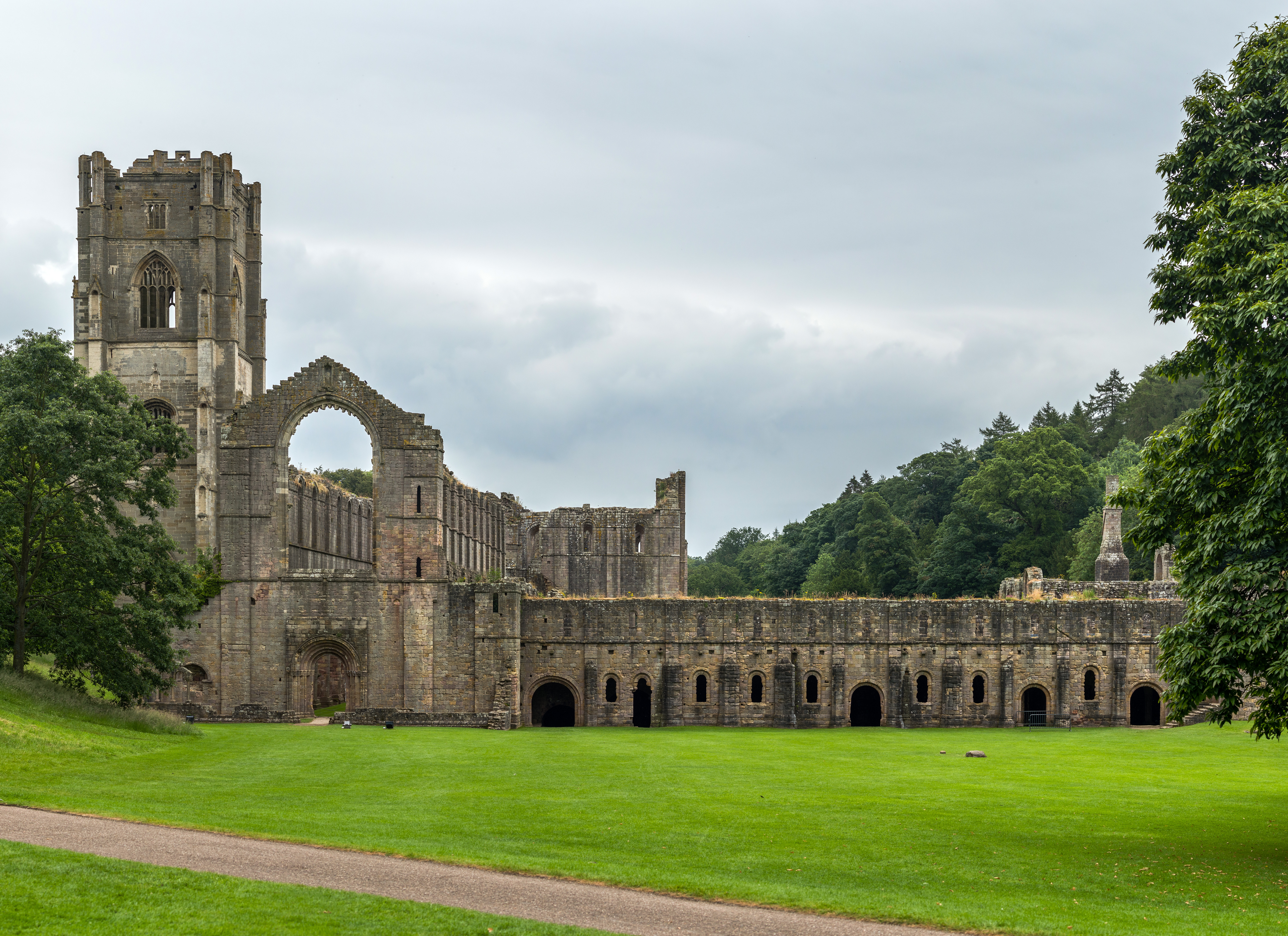
Fountains abbey from the west

When the Normans arrived in Yorkshire there were no monastic foundations. The old Northumbrian clifftop abbey of Whitby lay in ruins. In the centuries following the Conquest splendid abbeys and priories were built in Yorkshire. The first of these was Selby Abbey, founded in 1069 and the birthplace of Henry I of England. There followed the abbeys of St Mary's, York, Rievaulx, Fountains, Whitby, Byland, Jervaulx, Kirkstall, Roche, Meaux and many other smaller establishments. During the succeeding 70 years religious orders flourished, particularly after the promotion of Thurstan of Bayeux to the archbishopric of York in 1114. Between 1114 and 1135 at least 14 were established.

The Norman landowners were keen to increase their revenues by establishing new towns and planned villages. Among others, the boroughs of Richmond, Pontefract, Sheffield, Doncaster, Helmsley and Scarborough were established in this way as were the villages of Levisham and Appleton-le-Moors on the North York Moors and Wheldrake in the Vale of York. York was the pre-eminent centre of population before the conquest and was one of only four pre-existing towns. The others included Bridlington and Pocklington.

The Danish invasions ceased at this time, but the Scots continued their invasions throughout the medieval period. The Battle of the Standard was fought against the Scots near Northallerton in 1138.

During this period the majority of the Yorkshire population was engaged in small scale farming. A growing number of families were living on the margin of subsistence and some of these families turned to crafts and trade or industrial occupations. By 1300 Yorkshire farmers had reached the present-day limits of cultivation on the Pennines. Both lay and monastic landowners exploited the minerals on their estates. There were forges producing iron, and lead was being mined and smelted in the northern dales. In the West Riding there were numerous small coal workings. Until the late 12th century the cloth industry was mostly urban, focussed on York and Beverley. By 1300 the towns of Hedon, Masham, Northallerton, Ripon, Selby, Whitby and Yarm were also involved in cloth manufacture. Around this time the balance of cloth manufacturing was changing in favour of the West Riding rural communities where it was a cottage industry and free of the restrictions of town guilds.

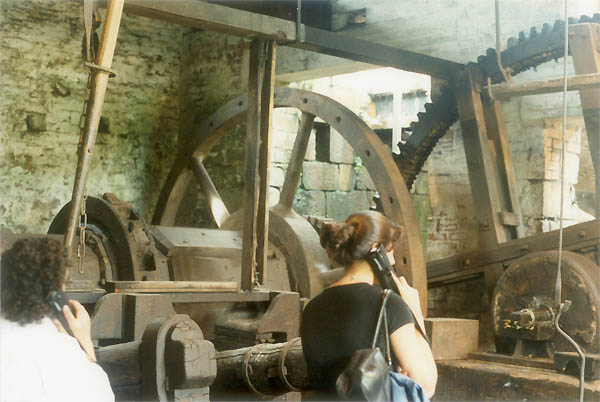
Water-powered, belt-driven machinery, Abbeydale Industrial Hamlet, Sheffield.

Sheffield, situated amongst a number of fast-flowing rivers and streams surrounded by hills containing raw materials such as coal, iron ore, ganister, and millstone grit for grindstones, made it an ideal place for water-powered industries to develop. Water wheels were often initially built for the milling of corn, but many were converted to the manufacture of blades. As early as the 14th century Sheffield was noted for the production of knives, as noted in Geoffrey Chaucer's The Reeve's Tale from The Canterbury Tales.

In the early decades of the 14th century Yorkshire suffered from a series of poor harvests, cattle disease and plundering Scottish armies. The Black Death reached Yorkshire in the spring of 1349. The population was reduced drastically by these misfortunes and consequently more land became available for the survivors. The following decades saw the rise of relatively wealthy farming families who founded dynasties of yeomen and minor gentlemen. The large Honours that were created in Yorkshire and the North of England by William I after the Conquest made them attractive for succeeding monarchs to give to their sons to support a royal lifestyle. These honours were, in some cases, combined to form Duchies, the most notable of which were the duchies of York and Lancaster.

Wars of the Roses

When conflict arose between the two Dukes during the Wars of the Roses much of the fighting took place in Yorkshire, where their estates were interlocked and woven together.

The leading families in the East and West Ridings supported the House of Lancaster overwhelmingly, but in the North Riding loyalty was divided. The Nevilles of Sheriff Hutton and Middleham, the Scropes of Bolton, the Latimers of Danby and Snape, and the Mowbrays of Thirsk and Burton in Lonsdale supported the House of York. The Nevilles’ great rivals, the Percies, together with the Cliffords of Skipton, Ros of Helmsley, Greystock of Hinderskelfe, Stafford of Holderness and Talbot of Sheffield fought for the Lancastrians.

John of Gaunt, 1st Duke of Lancaster had senior influence over many people in the North of England and consequently, Yorkshiremen fought under his command in the Hundred Years' War. King Richard III of England in the House of York held early office in the Council of the North, at Middleham Castle where Edward of Middleham, Prince of Wales was born. The last vestiges of feudal order remain to-date in the Duchy of Lancaster, founded by the House of Lancaster.

Both Yorkshire and Richmondshire had significant connections with Scotland and France through the personal connections of their feudal and titular Peers which may have been connected to the Auld Alliance. One must consider the historically Norse origins of Yorkshire's population, the local ties of Balliol, Bruce and Stewart monarchs of Scotland, including Scottish royal fiefdom of Northumbria at several times. (See Earl of Huntingdon)

== Early Modern ==
When the Earl of Richmond became King of England in 1485 his dynasty began systematically to destroy or remove local resistance to their rule by confiscating their religious rights and economic livelihood.

The Yorkshire rebellion of 1489 occurred during the reign of Henry VII. Parliament wanted money to help defend Brittany, which was allied to England, in the war against France. Henry sent Percy, Earl of Northumberland to collect taxes to help raise some money. However, many of the people in Northumberland and Yorkshire claimed to have already paid their part through local taxes, and were unwilling to give more money to defend a country of no geographical threat to them, as Yorkshire and Northumberland are in Northern England, whereas Brittany is closer to Cornwall and London. Rebellion broke out in April 1489. The Earl met the rebels, but a scuffle broke out and he was killed. The rebels then asked for pardon but were denied it by the king who sent a large army to the north, led by the Earl of Surrey. The Rebel leader, John á Chambre was hanged for treason, so they found a new leader in Sir John Egremont (an illegitimate member of the Percy family). Unfortunately for the rebels, Egrement proved to be unreliable and so fled to the Court of Margaret of York, Duchess of Burgundy and a staunch opposer to Henry's rule. The results of this rebellion were that Henry was unable to get enough money to defend Brittany and he became aware of the lawless nature of the North of England.

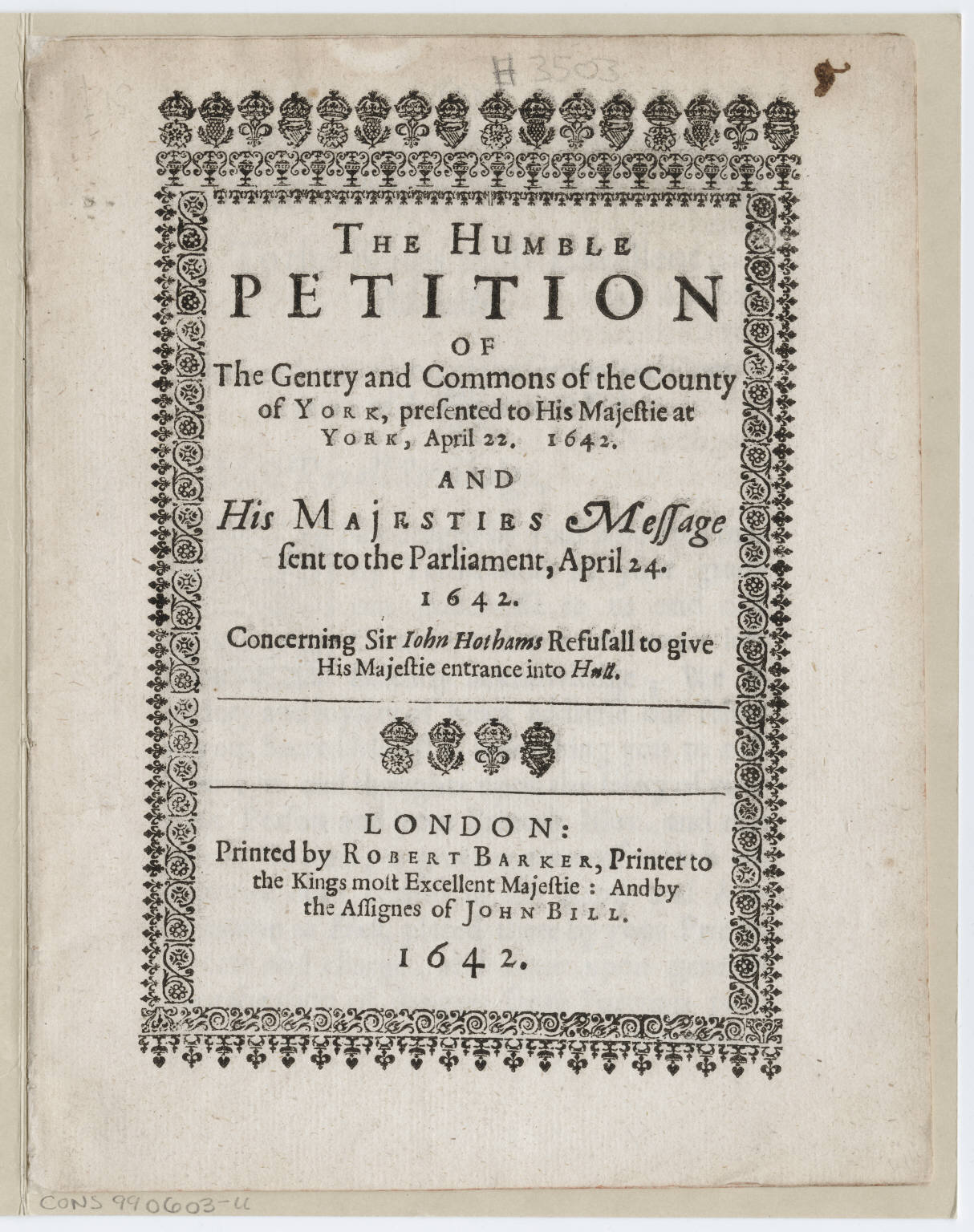
The Humble Petition of The Gentry and Commons of the County of York, presented to His Majestie at York, 22 April 1642 : and His Majesties message sent to the Parliament, 24 April 1642 : concerning Sir John Hothams Refusall to give His Majestie entrance into Hull. Printed at London, 1642

Between 1536 and 1540, the Dissolution of the Monasteries by Henry VIII of England had a profound and permanent effect on the Yorkshire landscape. Thousands of acres of monastic property was divided and sold to form the estates of the gentry and the newly rich industrial entrepreneurs. This happened right across the county from Guisborough Priory in the north through to Rievaulx Abbey on the North York Moors, Jervaulx Abbey and Fountains Abbey in the dales and Roche Abbey in the south. In all 120 religious institutions were closed in Yorkshire. The unpopularity of the Tudor royals resonated in the Pilgrimage of Grace and Rising of the North. During the reign of Queen Elizabeth Yorkshire saw a steady rise in population. New industries created employment and wealth, and improved farming methods and imports of corn stopped food shortages. The steady rise in population created pressure to enclose common land for agriculture and the farming communities turned increasingly to cottage industries to make a living.

The Gunpowder Plot of 1605 had Yorkshire associations, Guy Fawkes was born in York where he was educated at St Peters School. Nevertheless, a government inquiry of 1605-6 revealed that the plot lacked significant support in the county. The economy and character of many West Riding settlements became markedly different from the other areas of the county in the 17th century. Farmers combined mining, metal working, weaving, tanning and other crafts with agriculture in these towns which were not subject to the restrictive practices of guilds.By 1600 Sheffield was the main centre of cutlery production in England, and in 1624 The Company of Cutlers in Hallamshire was formed to oversee the trade. In Leeds in 1629 manufacturers were employing men full-time as clothiers.

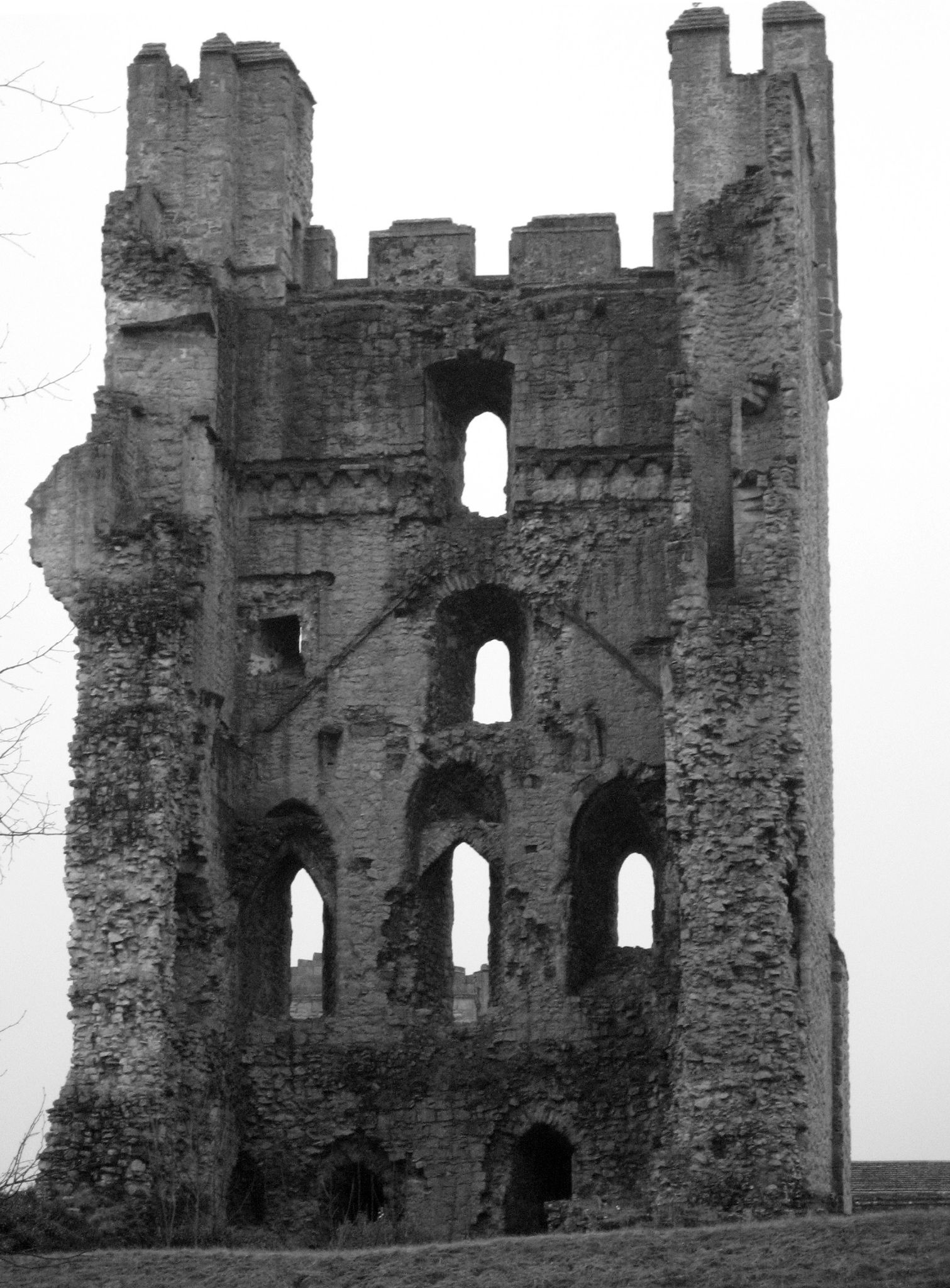
Helmsley Castle was destroyed at the end of the Civil War

Many local families were Cavaliers in the English Civil War and some fled to American colonies during the usurping Commonwealth of England or The Protectorate. Most were either neutral, divided or changed sides. At an early stage in the conflict King Charles attempted to establish a garrison at Kingston upon Hull but was denied entry. After some initial successes the Parliamentary forces were defeated across most of Yorkshire but they staged a comeback and in 1644 at the Battle of Marston Moor Oliver Cromwell's cavalry routed Prince Rupert's forces and during the next few months the remaining royalist garrisons in the north fell. At the end of the war many of the old castles of Yorkshire such as Helmsley and Pontefract were dismantled so that they could never again be fortified.

King James II of England was owner of colonial New York as the Duke of York, as well as governor of the Hudson's Bay Company and Royal African Company.

Some locals were closet Recusants, Tory or Jacobite in political orientation, not happy being used against their Scottish neighbours. National government conceded to their sensitivities by appointing a Council of the North and a Secretary of State for the Northern Department, but these were abolished upon the government suspecting its link with independent Northern influence on national affairs, especially in connection to the American War of Independence. Charles Lennox, 4th Duke of Richmond, was Governor General of British North America, after his father had pioneered the peace settlement with the Americans and pressed for a "Union of Hearts" with the Irish. Irish Catholics dispossessed of their lands and experiencing discrimination at home, found a warm welcome from Yorkshiremen in the cities of the West Riding.

== Modern ==
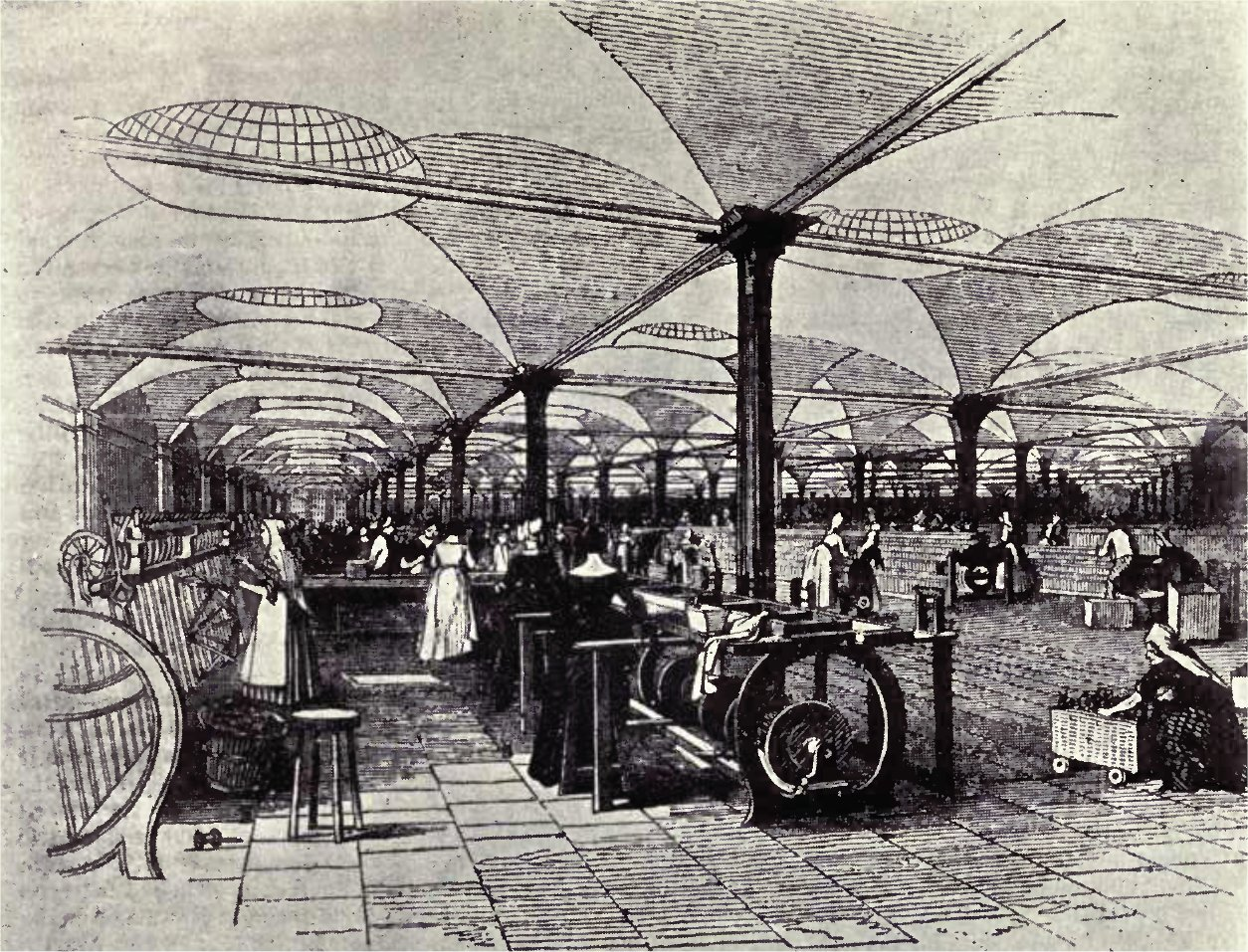
The 19th-century interior of Marshall's flax mill, Holbeck, Leeds

The 19th century was a time of rapid urbanisation and industrialisation in Yorkshire. Yorkshire was already a centre of industry in textiles, concentrated in the West Riding. Steel continued to be concentrated around Sheffield, as was the production of coal. The worsted sector of the textile industry was the first to adapt the machinery developed by the Lancashire cotton industry and had become completely factory based by the 1860s including large horizontally integrated mills.

Steel production at this time involved long working hours, in unpleasant conditions that offered little or no safety protection. Friedrich Engels in his The Condition of the Working Class in England in 1844 described the conditions prevalent in Sheffield at that time. The city became one of the main centres for trade union organisation and agitation in the UK. By the 1860s, the growing conflict between capital and labour provoked the so-called 'Sheffield Outrages', which culminated in a series of explosions and murders carried out by union militants. The Sheffield Trades Council organised a meeting in Sheffield in 1866 at which the United Kingdom Alliance of Organised Trades — a forerunner of the Trades Union Congress (TUC) — was founded.

William Wilberforce, Member of Parliament for Hull, was a prominent abolitionist in the slave trade. The Edwardian period in Yorkshire brought the Labour Party into focus, as it tried to mobilise further reform. Robert Baden-Powell, 1st Baron Baden-Powell commanded the Northern Territorial Army at Richmond Castle until 1910.

== Changes in 1974 ==
Local government in England was reformed in 1974 by the Local Government Act 1972. Under the act, the ridings lost their lieutenancies and shrievalties and the administrative counties, county boroughs and their councils were abolished. The area of Yorkshire was divided between a number of metropolitan and non-metropolitan counties:

Some areas of Yorkshire were transferred from the ridings to neighbouring counties:

- Sedbergh, Dent and the rest of the Sedbergh Rural District was transferred from the West Riding to Cumbria
- Slaidburn and the rest of Bowland Rural District was transferred from the West Riding to Lancashire
- Barnoldswick and other places in West Craven were transferred from the West Riding to Lancashire
- Saddleworth was transferred from the West Riding to Greater Manchester
- Bowes and the rest of Startforth Rural District was transferred from the North Riding to County Durham
- Middlesbrough, Redcar and nearby areas were transferred from the North Riding to Cleveland. The area was returned to Yorkshire in 1996 as part of the ceremonial county of North Yorkshire.
- most of the East Riding was transferred to Humberside. The area became the larger part of the new ceremonial county of the East Riding of Yorkshire in 1996.
- Goole and Goole Rural District was transferred from the West Riding to Humberside. The area became part of the East Riding of Yorkshire in 1996.

The remaining areas of the East Riding and the North Riding, the city of York and northern and eastern areas of the West Riding became North Yorkshire.

The remaining areas of the West Riding became the metropolitan counties of South Yorkshire and West Yorkshire.

== Local government ==
The history of local government in Yorkshire is both unique and complex, largely due to its size, being the largest historic English county. After an extended period of little change, it was subject to a number of significant reforms of local government structures in the 20th century, some of which were controversial. The most significant of these was the Local Government Act 1972 and the 1990s UK local government reform. It currently corresponds to several counties and districts and is mostly contained within the Yorkshire and the Humber region.

== See also ==
- History of England
- History of the United Kingdom
