= Stanwick Iron Age Fortifications =

Iron Age hill fort in North Yorkshire, England

Coordinates: 54.50300°N 1.72356°W

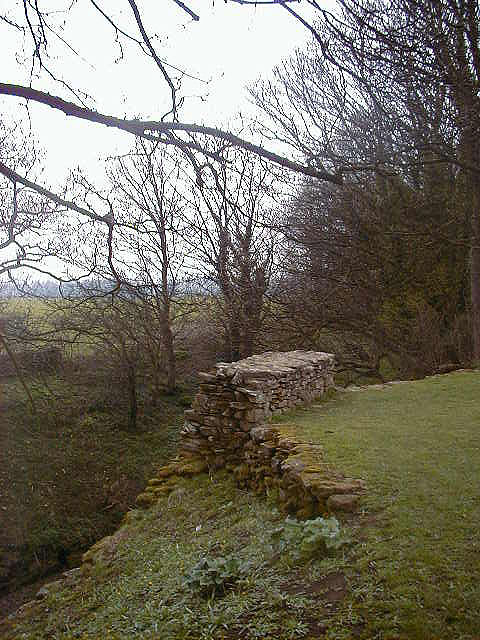
Wheeler's Wall

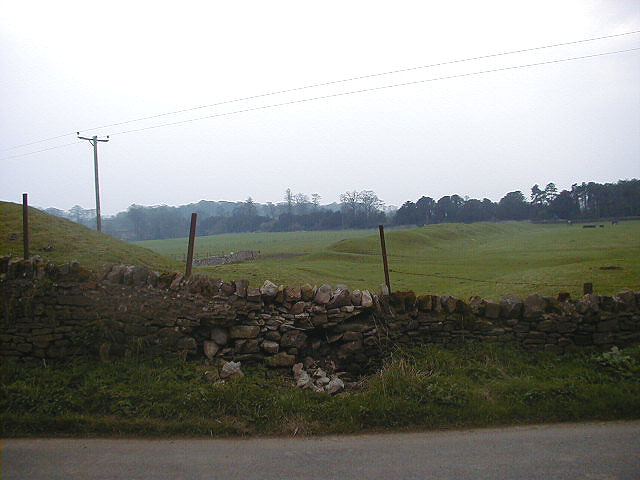
Stanwick Fortifications close to the main gate in the north west

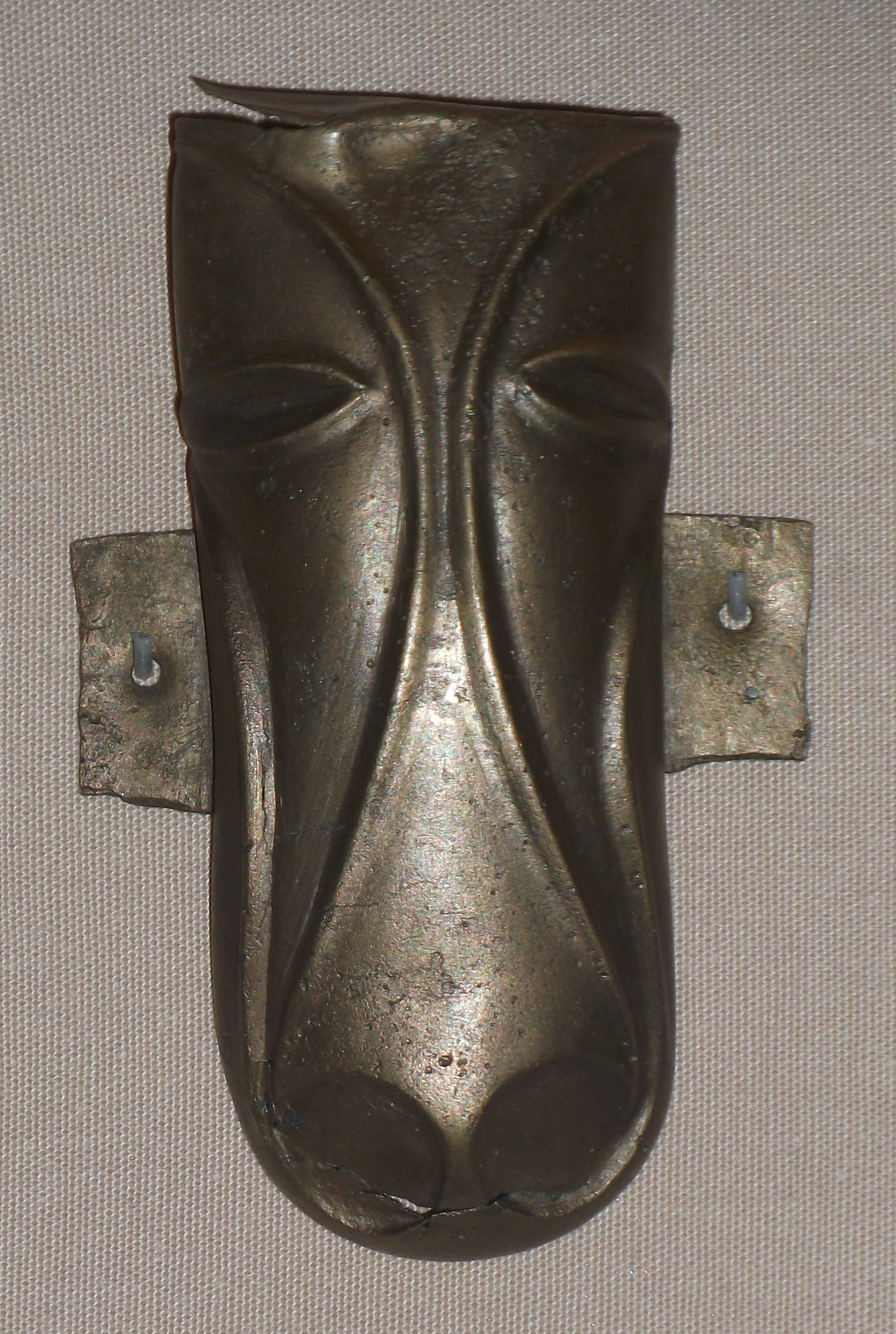
The Stanwick Horse Mask (British Museum)

The Stanwick Iron Age Fortifications (also known as 'Stanwick Camp'), a huge Iron Age hill fort, sometimes but not always considered an oppidum, comprising over 9 kilometres (5.6 mi) of ditches and ramparts enclosing approximately 300 hectares (740 acres) of land, are situated in Richmondshire, North Yorkshire, England. Whether Stanwick was the stronghold of Venutius or Cartimandua, or perhaps of them both for a brief time before their acrimonious split some time after 51 AD, it is certain that this settlement was one of the most important in Brigantia, the Brigantes kingdom during the early stages of the Roman occupation of Britain. The site is a scheduled monument.

== Location and etymology ==
The fortifications are located 8 miles (13 km) north of the town of Richmond and 10 miles (16 km) south west of Darlington, close to Scotch Corner and the remains of the Roman fort and bridge at Piercebridge. Rising to a height of almost 5 metres (16 feet) in places, the ramparts completely surround the village of Stanwick St John and form one of the largest Iron Age settlements in Britain, in extent if not necessarily in population. The name 'Stanwick' is thought to be derived from the Old Norse word 'steinvegges', meaning stone walls; although an Anglo-Saxon etymology, from stān "stone" and wic "settlement", is also plausible.

== Stanwick Hoard ==
In 1845 a hoard of 140 metal artefacts known as the Stanwick Hoard, which included four sets of horse harness for chariots and a bronze horse head 'bucket attachment', was found 0.5 mi (800 m) away at Melsonby. The hoard is now held by the British Museum, which also has the Meyrick Helmet, which may have been part of the hoard or have been made at Stanwick.

== Mortimer Wheeler excavations ==
Stanwick was the site of Sir Mortimer Wheeler's last major archaeological excavation in Britain, which he carried out over the summers of 1951 and 1952. Wheeler argued that the vast site had been constructed in three separate 'phases' starting from a modest 17-acre (7 ha) earthwork enclosure on a low hill known as 'The Tofts', dated to around 40 AD (Phase I) then extended around 50–60 AD with a new enclosure to the north of over 130-acre (53 ha) (Phase II), and then finally, around 72 AD, extended by a further 600 acres (240 ha) to the south (Phase III).

During the course of his excavations, Wheeler cleared a 50-foot (15 m) section of ditch that the Brigantes had cut from the underlying limestone rock. He partially reconstructed a 10-foot (3 m) length of dry-stone revetment wall from the fallen stones found in the ditch. This was constructed to an approximate height of 2 feet (60 cm) above the existing rampart, although Wheeler estimated that the original height of the wall above the rampart was probably closer to 15 feet (5 m). Known as 'Wheeler's Wall', this entire section remains preserved by English Heritage and provides the visitor to Stanwick with a clear impression of how awe-inspiring the fortifications would have been in Iron Age times.

Amongst Wheeler's most famous finds at Stanwick were an Iron Age sword, unusually still in its well-preserved ash wood scabbard, and the nearby skull of a severed head, showing considerable damage from wounds inflicted by an axe or a sword. These were found in an excavation of a ditch terminal next to the location of the main north western gate and Wheeler believed they may have been hanging from the gate structure itself as a trophy or warning to enemies. Wheeler concluded that Stanwick had been the rebel stronghold of Venutius, who had been the husband of the pro-Roman Brigantian queen Cartimandua, after he had split with her when she had taken his charioteer and armour-bearer Vellocatus as a lover and betrayed the rebel leader Caractacus to the Romans. Wheeler argued that Stanwick was where Venutius had rallied his anti-Roman tribesmen and allies for his revolt against the Roman invaders.

== Durham University excavations ==
The next series of major archaeological excavations at Stanwick were carried out from 1981 to 1986 by a team from Durham University led by Percival Turnbull and Professor Colin Haselgrove. One of their most enigmatic finds was an adult male burial at the rear of a rampart in the fortifications where a horse's head had been carefully placed upon the body. Turnbull and Haselgrove argued that Stanwick's huge outer circuit of ditches and banks had probably been built first, during the mid-first century AD, and then the inner area sub-divided. They maintained that the six miles (10 km) fortification was too long to be easily defended and that its enormous size was intended instead to emphasise the power, prestige and wealth of its owner. They concluded that Stanwick had not been the fortress stronghold of Venutius but was rather the estate of his ex-wife, Queen Cartimandua, and possibly even the original tribal capital of the Brigantes.

== See also ==
- List of hill forts in England
- List of hill forts in Scotland
- List of hill forts in Wales
- Melsonby Hoard
