= Caratacus' last battle =

Final battle in Caratacus' resistance to Roman rule (50 AD)

- Part of the Roman conquest of Britain
Date	50 AD
Location	Unknown, within the territory of the Ordovices
Result	Roman victory

Belligerents
Roman Empire	Britons

Commanders and leaders
Publius Ostorius Scapula	Caratacus

Strength
Unknown	Unknown

The final battle in Caratacus' resistance to Roman rule was fought in 50 AD. The Romans under Publius Ostorius Scapula defeated the Britons and in the aftermath captured Caratacus himself, since 43 the leader of armed opposition to the Roman conquest of Britain. He was paraded through Rome and given the opportunity to make a speech before the emperor Claudius, who spared his life and those of his family and retainers.

== Prelude ==
Tacitus outlines the campaigns leading up to the battle:

The army then marched against the Silures, a naturally fierce people and now full of confidence in the might of Caratacus, who by many an indecisive and many a successful battle had raised himself far above all the other generals of the Britons. Inferior in military strength, but deriving an advantage from the deceptiveness of the country, he at once shifted the war by a stratagem into the territory of the Ordovices, where, joined by all who dreaded peace with us, he resolved on a final struggle.

== Location ==
Tacitus' account limits the location to the territory of the Ordovices, whose boundaries are no longer known. It included a large area of what is now central and northern Wales. He gives several details, which limit, but do not conclusively identify, the site of the battle:

[Caratacus] selected a position for the engagement in which advance and retreat alike would be difficult for our men and comparatively easy for his own, and then on some lofty hills, wherever their sides could be approached by a gentle slope, he piled up stones to serve as a rampart. A river too of varying depth was in his front, and his armed bands were drawn up before his defences.

His topographical details thus include an un-named river, fordable in some stretches, tactically close to high hills offering inaccessible slopes and many loose rocks, possibly scree, but also some paths up with gentler gradients, which trained men could climb while closely packed together in testudo formation.

Various sites have been theorised, though no suggested location has achieved academic plausibility nor fulfilled all of Tacitus' elements.

Tacitus does not name the river, but some local historians have supposed that it is the Severn hence proposed locations like Cefn Carnedd or British Camp in the Malvern Hills. However, the last wouldn't have been in Ordovices territory and the Severn, though visible from the Malvern Hills, is too distant to fit Tacitus's description of the site.

Alternatively, Caer Caradoc near Church Stretton in Shropshire or more likely Caer Caradog nearby Chapel Lawn in Shropshire, on the Redlake river, can be linked to the battle.. It is believed "by local tradition" and "with the support of instructed opinion" to be the site of the last stand.

== Pre-battle speeches ==
On this occasion Tacitus does not follow the common practice of inventing the specific words spoken by the leaders or men. On the British side he reports:

Then too the chieftains of the several tribes went from rank to rank, encouraging and confirming the spirit of their men by making light of their fears, kindling their hopes, and by every other warlike incitement. As for Caratacus, he flew hither and thither, protesting that that day and that battle would be the beginning of the recovery of their freedom, or of everlasting bondage. He appealed, by name, to their forefathers who had driven back the dictator Caesar, by whose valour they were free from the Roman axe and tribute, and still preserved inviolate the persons of their wives and of their children. While he was thus speaking, the host shouted applause; every warrior bound himself by his national oath not to shrink from weapons or wounds.

Facing a strong position full of aroused fighting men, Ostorius was not keen on a frontal assault. Tacitus reports:

Such enthusiasm confounded the Roman general. The river too in his face, the rampart they had added to it, the frowning hilltops, the stern resistance and masses of fighting men everywhere apparent, daunted him.

The Roman troops, who had by this point been trudging around Wales after Caratacus for some years, were eager for a decisive fight.

But his soldiers insisted on battle, exclaiming that valour could overcome all things; and the prefects and tribunes, with similar language, stimulated the ardour of the troops.

== Battle ==
Ostorius took note of the paths up the slopes facing his men. He launched his men over the fordable sections of the river. The Roman soldiers came under a rain of missiles, but employed the testudo formation to protect themselves and dismantled the stone ramparts. Once inside the defences, the Romans broke through in bloody fighting. The Britons withdrew to the hilltops, but the Romans kept up the attack by both auxiliaries and legionaries. The Britons were generally without body armour or helmets and they broke and fled; the Roman troops then closely pursued the fugitives. Tacitus reports:

Ostorius having ascertained by a survey the inaccessible and the assailable points of the position, led on his furious men, and crossed the river without difficulty. When he reached the barrier, as long as it was a fight with missiles, the wounds and the slaughter fell chiefly on our soldiers; but when we had formed the military testudo, and the rude, ill-compacted fence of stones was torn down, and it was an equal hand-to-hand engagement, the barbarians retired to the heights. Yet even there, both light and heavy-armed soldiers rushed to the attack; the first harassed the foe with missiles, while the latter closed with them, and the opposing ranks of the Britons were broken, destitute as they were of the defense of breast-plates or helmets. When they faced the auxiliaries, they were felled by the swords and javelins of our legionaries; if they wheeled round, they were again met by the sabres and spears of the auxiliaries.

== Aftermath ==
Tacitus writes:

It was a glorious victory; the wife and daughter of Caratacus were captured, and his brothers too were admitted to surrender.

Caratacus himself escaped. He fled north, seeking refuge among the Brigantes. The Brigantian queen, Cartimandua, depended on Rome for her personal position, and she handed him over to the Romans in chains. Tacitus reports:

There is seldom safety for the unfortunate, and Caratacus, seeking the protection of Cartismandua, queen of the Brigantes, was put in chains and delivered up to the conquerors, nine years after the beginning of the war in Britain.

== Display in Rome ==
The name and fame of Caratacus were now known far outside the army of Britain, and he and his family were central attractions in the triumphal parade through the streets of Rome before the Emperor Claudius himself. (After the fall of the Roman Republic, triumphs were celebrated in the name of the reigning emperor.) Caratacus' defeat was publicly likened by the Senators to some of Rome's greatest victories, and Ostorius Scapula was awarded triumphal ornaments for defeating him.

The normal practice would have been for the prisoners to be executed at the end of the triumphal ceremony. Caratacus gave a speech which persuaded Claudius to spare him and his family.

His fame had spread thence, and traveled to the neighbouring islands and provinces, and was actually celebrated in Italy. All were eager to see the great man, who for so many years had defied our power. Even at Rome the name of Caratacus was no obscure one; and the emperor, while he exalted his own glory, enhanced the renown of the vanquished. The people were summoned as to a grand spectacle; the praetorian cohorts were drawn up under arms in the plain in front of their camp; then came a procession of the royal vassals, and the ornaments and neck-chains and the spoils which the king had won in wars with other tribes, were displayed. Next were to be seen his brothers, his wife and daughter; last of all, Caratacus himself. All the rest stooped in their fear to abject supplication; not so the king, who neither by humble look nor speech sought compassion.

Tacitus would have been a small child at this time, but he reports Caratacus' words as if he had been taking contemporaneous notes:

When he was set before the emperor's tribunal, he spoke as follows: 'Had my moderation in prosperity been equal to my noble birth and fortune, I should have entered this city as your friend rather than as your captive; and you would not have disdained to receive, under a treaty of peace, a king descended from illustrious ancestors and ruling many nations. My present lot is as glorious to you as it is degrading to myself. I had men and horses, arms and wealth. What wonder if I parted with them reluctantly? If you Romans choose to lord it over the world, does it follow that the world is to accept slavery? Were I to have been at once delivered up as a prisoner, neither my fall nor your triumph would have become famous. My punishment would be followed by oblivion, whereas, if you save my life, I shall be an everlasting memorial of your clemency.'" "Upon this the emperor granted pardon to Caratacus, to his wife, and to his brothers. Released from their bonds, they did homage also to Agrippina who sat near, conspicuous on another throne, in the same language of praise and gratitude.

After his liberation, according to Dio Cassius, Caratacus was impressed by the city of Rome:

Caratacus, a barbarian chieftain who was captured and brought to Rome and later pardoned by Claudius, wandered about the city after his liberation; and after beholding its splendour and its magnitude he exclaimed: 'And can you, then, who have got such possessions and so many of them, covet our poor huts?'
