= Gabrantovices =

The Gabrantovices were a conjectural group of Ancient Britons inhabiting the coast of what is now Yorkshire in Northern England. They may have been a sub-tribe or sept of the Brigantes or of the Parisi.

As with their proposed neighbours, the Lopocares, the Gabrantovices are not directly attested: the name is taken from Ptolemy's name Γαβραντουικων Ευλιμενος Κολπος, or in Latin Gabrantvicvm Sinus — the Gabrantovician Harbour. This is identified with modern Bridlington Bay or Filey Bay. The meaning of the name has been discussed as deriving from one of two Celtic roots, either *gabro- meaning a goat (Welsh gafr) or *gabranto- meaning "riding a horse" with second element meaning "fight", so "Goat warriors" or "Cavalry warriors".
