= Brigantia (ancient region) =

Celtic territory in ancient Britain

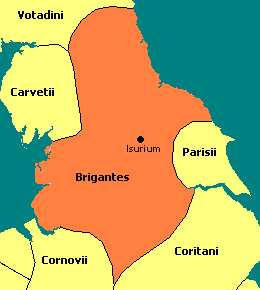
The size of Brigantia is shown in ancient Britain also showing the neighboring tribal borders

Brigantia is the land inhabited by the Brigantes, a British Celtic tribe which occupied the largest territory in ancient Britain. The territory of Brigantia which now forms Northern England and part of The Midlands covered the majority of the land between the River Tyne and the Humber estuary forming the largest Brythonic Kingdom in ancient Britain. It was recorded by Ptolemy in the 2nd century AD to extend sea to sea, from the Irish Sea on the west coast to the North Sea in the east.

== Etymology ==
It is unclear if the name Brigantia is derived from the highland topography of the area or from the Goddess Brigantia who was worshiped by the Brigantes themselves. In modern Welsh the word braint means 'privilege, prestige' and comes from the same root *brigantī. Other related forms from the modern languages are: Welsh brenin 'king' (< *brigantīnos); Welsh/Cornish/Breton bri 'prestige, reputation, honour, dignity', Scottish Gaelic brìgh 'pith, power', Irish brí 'energy, significance', Manx bree 'power, energy' (all < *brīg-/brigi-); and Welsh/Cornish/Breton bre 'hill' (< *brigā). The name Bridget from Old Irish Brigit (Modern Irish Bríd) also comes from Brigantī, as does the English river name Brent.

This mirrors the debate as to whether settlements named Brigantium (meaning 'settlement of the high ones') is in reference to nobility or the highlands they lived around, such as the Pennines. There are several ancient settlements named Brigantium around Europe, such as Berganza in Alava (Spain), Betanzos and Bergondo in Galicia (Spain), Bragança in Portugal and Briançon, Brigetio on the border of Slovakia and Hungary, Brigobanne situated on the Breg river and near the Brigach river in south Germany (pre-Roman Vindelicia) and Bregenz in the Alps. From the same origin also stems the name of the Italian sub-region of Brianza.

== History ==
In the form of a loose confederation, Brigantia existed as the territory of a number of small tribes with the Pennines being described as composing the heart. Extending from this, Brigantia was further formed by a number of sub-tribes whose territory is sometimes coined by some researchers as being part of Greater Brigantia as it is often debated as to which tribes formed a sept of Brigantia and which may have been independent. Some of the sub-tribes often included are the Setantii who occupied western and southern Lancashire, Textoverdi in the upper valley of the River South Tyne and the Carvetii who occupied what is now Cumbria.

Isurium or Isurium of the Brigantes (Latin: Isurium Brigantum) the historical capital of the kingdom became a Roman regional capital (civitas) in the province of Britannia at the site of present-day Aldborough, North Yorkshire, England, in the United Kingdom. Its remains—the Aldborough Roman Site—are in the care of English Heritage. Bremetennacum Veteranorum (Ribchester) and Mamucium (Manchester) as well as Coccium (Wigan) were all Roman forts stationed in Brigantia.

Around 43 AD when the Brigantes were first recorded, Brigantia consisted of mossland, marshes and forests which they inhabited; such ancient forests include the Forest of Lyme and the Forest of Bowland. At the time they would have been wild with fauna that were hunted, including: eurasian brown bear, wild boar, wolves, deer and eagles.

== See also ==
- Brigantes
- Ancient Britons
- Prehistoric Britain
- Stanwick Iron Age Fortifications
