= Caesius Nasica =

1st century AD Roman military officer

Caesius Nasica was a Roman military officer of the Roman Imperial army.

He commanded Legio IX Hispana in Britain, and defeated the first revolt of Venutius of the Brigantes during the governorship of Aulus Didius Gallus (52 to 57).

He may have been the elder brother of Quintus Petillius Cerialis.
