= Lopocares =

The Lopocares were a conjectural group of Ancient Britons inhabiting the area around Corbridge in Northumberland, Northeast England. They may have been a sub-tribe or sept of the Brigantes.

The Lopocares are not directly attested in any records: the name is reconstructed from the name of Corbridge as given in the Ravenna Cosmography, Corielopocarium, but this appears in another Roman source — the Antonine Itinerary — in a different form as Corstopitium. The "corie-" element is interpreted either as a Celtic word *korio-, army or host or as the Latin curia, but the meaning of the name Lopocares itself is unknown.
