= Vellocatus =

1st century AD king of the Brigantes tribe of northern Britain

- King of the Brigantes

King of the Brigantes
- Reign: after AD 51 - AD 69
- Predecessor: Venutius (first reign)
- Successor: Venutius (second reign)
- Co-ruler: Cartimandua
- Born: c. 1st century AD
- Died: After AD 69
- Spouse: Cartimandua
- Father: Unknown
- Mother: Unknown

Vellocatus was a first-century king of the Brigantes tribe of northern Britain.

He was originally armour-bearer to Venutius, husband of Cartimandua, the queen of the Brigantes and an ally of Rome. Some time after 51 AD Cartimandua split with Venutius, divorcing him and marrying Vellocatus and elevating him to kingship. Vellocatus appears to have been a member of the servant class, rather than a noble. According to Roman historian Tacitus "the royal house was immediately shaken by this disgraceful act", as many aristocrats would not accept a former servant as their king.

The former king Venutius was able to gather followers, becoming an important figure in the resistance to Roman occupation. Venutius staged two revolts against Cartimandua, first in the mid-50s, which was defeated by the Romans, and again in 69, this time successfully. Cartimandua was rescued by the Romans as Venutius seized power. Vellocatus's fate is not recorded.

== Sources ==
- Tacitus, Histories 3:45
