= Colin Haselgrove =

British archaeologist and academic

- Occupations: Archaeologist; Lecturer

Academic background
- Education: University of Cambridge
- Thesis: Iron Age coin finds in South-East England: the archaeological context (1986)

Academic work
- Discipline: Archaeology
- Sub-discipline: Iron Age Britain and Europe
- Institutions: Durham University; University of Leicester
- Doctoral students: Julia Farley

Colin Haselgrove, FBA, FSA is a British archaeologist and academic specialising in Iron Age Britain and Europe. He is currently Professor of Archaeology at the University of Leicester. He was the Head of the School of Archaeology & Ancient History at Leicester from 2006 to 2012 and was previously Professor of Archaeology at Durham University. He is the Chair of the Archaeology Section of the British Academy.

== Honours ==
On 4 May 1989, Haselgrove was elected Fellow of the Society of Antiquaries (FSA). In 2009, he was elected Fellow of the British Academy (FBA).
