= Aulus Didius Gallus =

1st century AD Roman general and politician

Inscription marking the course of Aqua Marcia, Aqua Tepula, and Aqua Julia, set up by Aulus Didius Gallus and two colleagues, Titus Rubrius Nepos and Marcus Cornelius Firmus, during his term as curator aquarum, AD 38–49 (CIL VI 1248 = 31559)

Aulus Didius Gallus was a member of the Roman Senate and general active during the 1st century AD. He held a number of offices and imperial appointments, the most important of which were governor of Britain between 52 and 57 AD, proconsul of Asia, and suffect consul in the nundinium of September to December 39 as the colleague of Domitius Afer.

== Career ==
According to Anthony Birley, Aulus Didius Gallus was considered a novus homo, "if not necessarily the first of his family to enter the senate." A proconsul of Cyprus, Aulus Didius Postumus, might be a close relative.

His career up to 51 can be partly reconstructed from an inscription from Olympia. Didius is attested as quaestor in a senatus consultum dated to 19 AD, that forbade Senators, eques, and their descendants from actively participating in gladiator games. Birley notes that if this inscription has been correctly restored, "he had the signal honour, for a new man, of being quaestor of Tiberius." Further, if he achieved this magistrate at the normal age of 25, Gallus would have been born around 8/7 BC. Record of his tenure as plebeian tribune and aedile are missing from the inscription, while the next magistracies whose record survive on the inscription are legate or assistant to the proconsul of Asia, and prefect of cavalry. Birley admits that while "it would be fruitless to speculate on the identity of the proconsul of Asia under whom Gallus served" he observes that during this period only two men were proconsuls when he could have been their legate: Marcus Aemilius Lepidus, ordinary consul 6 AD, and Publius Petronius, consul 17, "making it probable that it was one of these two." As for his commission as prefect of cavalry, while Birley notes it has been thought he held it during the invasion of Britain, he argues it is more likely Didius commanded the cavalry as part of a campaign in Thrace "for it would satisfactorily explain the choice of Gallus to command the Moesian army c. 44-5."

After these two magistracies, Didius was proconsul of Sicily, which fell during the reign of Tiberius; "given Tiberius' practice," Birley comments, his governorship of Sicily "may have lasted more than twelve months". Didius was curator aquarum (superintendent of aqueducts) from 38 to 49, consul in 39, and a member of the septemviri epulonum, one of the four most prestigious ancient Roman priesthoods. Birley notes the later "would have had special prominence at the Secular Games in AD 47." Didius received triumphal regalia as an imperial legate under Claudius, probably in Bosporus: Tacitus records that he commanded forces there that were withdrawn in 49. After this the sortition awarded him the post of proconsular governor of Asia, which Ronald Syme dates to 49/50.

His later career is described by Tacitus. In 52 Didius was made governor of Britain, following the death in office of Ostorius Scapula, at a time when the situation was deteriorating as a result of a string of rebellions. The south-east was securely held, but despite the defeat of Caratacus the previous year, the tribes of what is now Wales, particularly the Silures, continued to hold out. Venutius' first insurrection against Queen Cartimandua of the Brigantes occurred during Didius' rule and he despatched troops under Caesius Nasica to aid her.

Didius acted to quell the rebels rather than enlarge the empire during his rule, which lasted until 57 AD. While Tacitus criticizes him for being reactive and defensive, Sheppard Frere argues that he was acting on instructions from Claudius who did not consider the benefits of further conquest in difficult terrain to be great enough to warrant the risk. "Provincial legates were carefully selected with an eye to what was to be required of them," Frere writes, "and will have received careful briefing on appointment; and throughout their tenure they were in close contact with Rome." Instead, Didius built roads and forts at the borders such as those at Usk to contain the native population. After five years in the post, covering the last two years of the reign of Claudius and the first three of Nero, Didius was replaced by Quintus Veranius.

Quintilian tells us that, after several years of campaigning for a provincial governorship, Didius complained at the province he was offered, although whether this refers to Sicily or Britain is unknown. The orator Domitius Afer sarcastically advised him to think of his country. The tombstone of his successor, Quintus Veranius, states that he took the job "although he did not seek it", which has been interpreted as a barbed comment on Didius.

== Eponym of Cardiff ==
The modern city of Cardiff in Wales is often stated to be named for Didius.

The earliest Welsh name for the city, Caerdyf combines the elements Caer (fort) which refers to the Roman fort established around 75 AD, and a second element which is less certain. The antiquarian William Camden recorded the origin of the name as "Caer-Didi" (Didius' Fort). This derives from local beliefs that Didius had built the fort before the arrival of Frontinus in Britain and his construction of numerous supplementary fortifications in South Wales.

Though most modern linguists dismiss this derivation, the Didius connection has remained popular throughout the centuries, appearing in Camden's Britannia (1586), The Beauties of England and Wales (1815), and the writings of Iolo Morganwg and Taliesin Williams.

== Relatives ==
Whom Didius married, or whether he had married at all, is unknown. From his name, experts believe that Aulus Didius Gallus Fabricius Veiento, who was praetor in 62, is somehow related to Didius. Some, such as Edmund Groag and Mario Torelli, thought that Veiento was his son or grandson. Olli Salomies has shown that it is more likely that Veiento was adopted by Didius Gallus, at some point before Veiento became praetor.

Anthony Birley mentions a "less certain" relative, Gaius Pomponius Gallus Didius Rufus, proconsul of Crete and Cyrenaica in 88/89.

Political offices
| Preceded by Gnaeus Domitius Corbulo, and ignotus | Suffect Consul of the Roman Empire; AD 39 with Gnaeus Domitius Afer | Succeeded by Caligula III, sine collega |
| Preceded by Ostorius Scapula | Roman governors of Britain; AD 52–57 | Succeeded by Quintus Veranius |
