= Cartimandua =

1st century AD Queen of the Brigantes in northern England

- Queen of the Brigantes
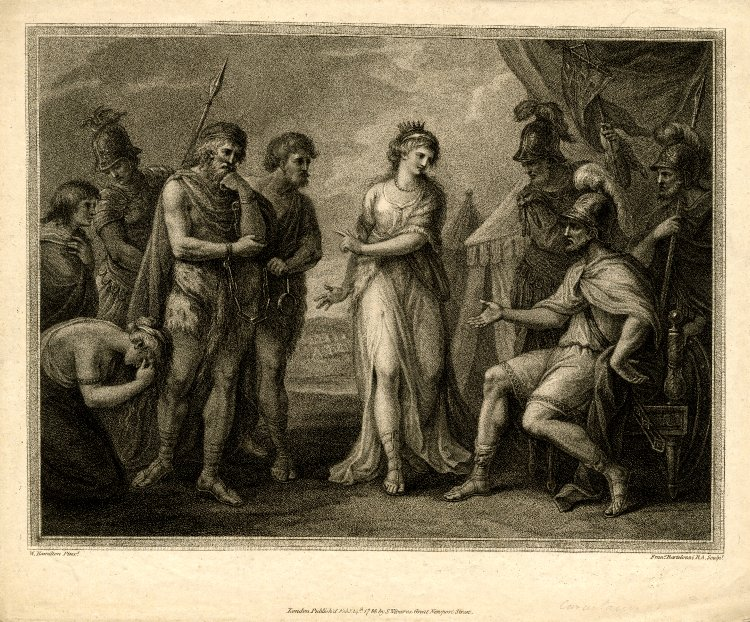
- "Caractacus, King of the Silures, deliver'd up to Ostorius, the Roman General, by Cartismandua, Queen of the Brigantes." – print by F. Bartolozzi, British Museum

Queen of the Brigantes
- Reign: before AD 51 – AD 69
- Successor: Venutius
- Co-ruler: Venutius (until divorce); Vellocatus (from remarriage)
- Born: c. 1st century AD
- Died: after AD 69
- Spouse: Venutius (divorced); Vellocatus

Cartimandua or Cartismandua (reigned c. AD 43 – c. 69) was a 1st-century queen of the Brigantes, a Celtic people living in what is now northern England. She is known through the writings of Roman historian Tacitus.

She came to power during the time period that Rome was campaigning against Britain. She was widely influential during her reign. As ruler of the Brigantes, she united various British tribes that eventually surrendered their loyalty to Rome.

Cartimandua is portrayed notoriously in Tacitus's account of her. She is recorded betraying the chieftain Caratacus, insincerely offering him sanctuary, but instead turning him in to the Romans in exchange for wealth. She also is recorded as having divorced her consort and replacing him with a common military man. She subsequently was engaged in extended military conflict with her ex-consort as he staged revolts against her multiple times, and she eventually lost to him.

== History ==
Although Cartimandua is first mentioned by Tacitus in AD 51, her rule over the Brigantes may already have been established when the Roman emperor Claudius began the organised conquest of Britain in 43: she may have been one of the eleven "kings" who Claudius's triumphal arch says surrendered without a fight. If not, she may have come to power after a revolt of a faction of the Brigantes was defeated by Publius Ostorius Scapula in 48.

Being of "illustrious birth", according to Tacitus, Cartimandua probably inherited her power, as she does not appear to have obtained it through marriage. She and her first husband, Venutius, are described by Tacitus as loyal to Rome and "defended by our [Roman] arms".

Her name may be a compound of the Common Celtic roots *carti- "chase, expel, send" and *mandu- "pony".

=== Betrayal of Caratacus ===
In 51, the British resistance leader Caratacus sought sanctuary with Cartimandua after being defeated by Ostorius Scapula in Wales, but Cartimandua handed him over to the Romans in chains. According to Tacitus:

She had later strengthened her power when she was credited with having captured King Caratacus by treachery and so furnished an adornment for the triumph of Claudius Caesar. From this came her wealth and the wanton spirit which success breeds.

=== Venutius divorce and conflict ===
Cartimandua later divorced Venutius, taking his armour-bearer, Vellocatus, as her consort. In 57, although Cartimandua had seized his brother and other relatives and held them hostage, Venutius made war against her and then against her Roman protectors. He built alliances outside the Brigantes, and during the governorship of Aulus Didius Gallus (52–57) he staged an invasion of the kingdom of the Brigantes. The Romans had anticipated this and sent some cohorts to defend their client queen. The fighting was inconclusive until Caesius Nasica arrived with a legion, the IX Hispana, and defeated the rebels. Cartimandua retained her throne thanks to prompt military support from Roman forces.

Tacitus wrote:

She grew to despise her husband Venutius, and took as her consort his squire Vellocatus, whom she admitted to share the throne with her. Her house was at once shaken by this scandalous act. Her husband was favoured by the sentiments of all the citizens; the adulterer was supported by the queen's passion for him and by her savage spirit. So Venutius, calling in aid from outside and at the same time assisted by a revolt of the Brigantes themselves, put Cartimandua into an extremely dangerous position. Then she asked the Romans for protection, and in fact some companies of our foot and horse, after meeting with indifferent success in a number of engagements, finally succeeded in rescuing the queen from danger. The throne was left to Venutius; the war to us.

Tacitus refers to Cartimandua leaving her consort for Vellocatus as scandalous. He also discusses how Venutius rallies against her, but fails after she secures aid from the Romans.

Cartimandua was not so successful in the year 69. Taking advantage of Roman instability during the year of four emperors, Venutius staged another revolt, again with help from other nations. Cartimandua appealed for troops from the Romans, who were only able to send auxiliaries. Cartimandua was evacuated, leaving Venutius in control of a kingdom at war with Rome. After this, Cartimandua disappears from the sources.
