= Venutius =

1st century AD King of the Brigantes in northern Britain

- King of the Brigantes

King of the Brigantes (first reign)
- Reign: before AD 51 – after AD 51
- Successor: Vellocatus
- Co-ruler: Cartimandua

King of the Brigantes (second reign)
- Reign: AD 69–?
- Predecessor: Cartimandua and Vellocatus
- Spouse: Cartimandua (divorced)

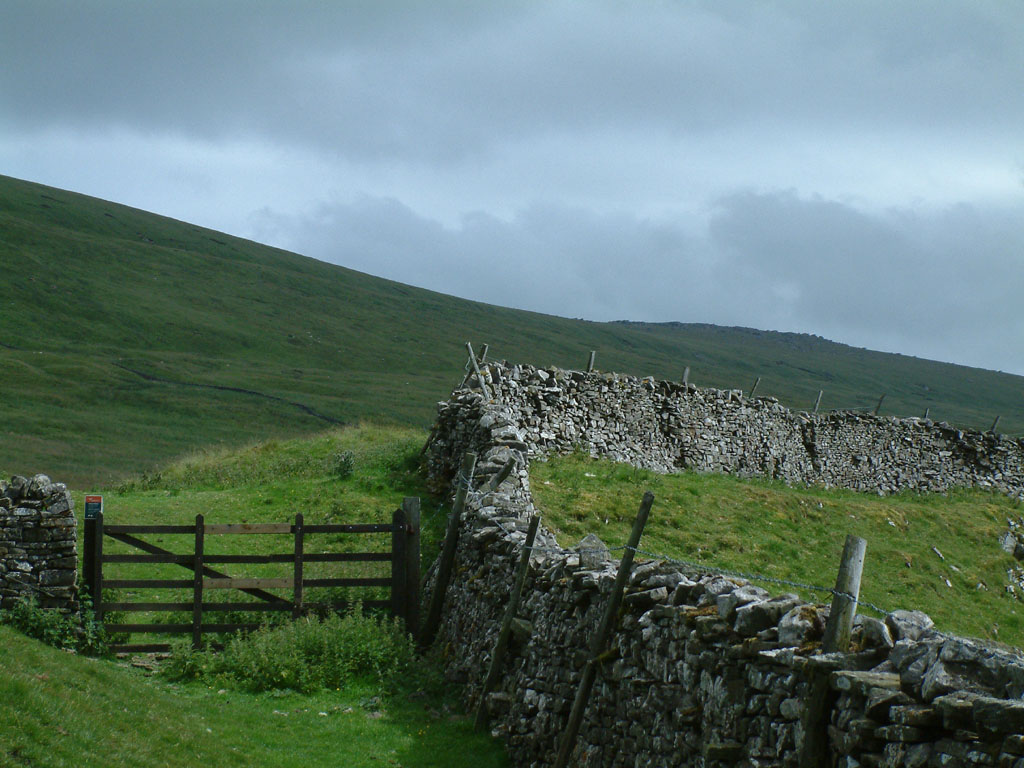
Section of Tor Dyke, defensive wall built under the instructions of Venutius against Roman invasion

Venutius was a 1st-century king of the Brigantes in northern Britain at the time of the Roman conquest. Some have suggested he may have belonged to the Carvetii, a tribe that probably formed part of the Brigantes confederation.

History first becomes aware of him as husband of Cartimandua, queen of the Brigantes, in about 51 AD. After the British resistance leader Caratacus was defeated by Publius Ostorius Scapula in Wales, he fled north to the Brigantes, only to be handed over to the Romans by Cartimandua. While the Brigantes were nominally an independent kingdom, Tacitus says Cartimandua and Venutius were loyal to Rome and "defended by Roman power". However, after the capture of Caratacus, Venutius became the most prominent leader of resistance to the Roman occupation. Cartimandua had apparently tired of him and married his armour-bearer, Vellocatus, whom she elevated to the kingship in Venutius's place. Initially, Venutius sought only to overthrow his ex-wife, only later turning his attention to her Roman protectors. The Romans defended their client queen and Venutius's revolt was defeated by Caesius Nasica during the governorship of Aulus Didius Gallus (52 - 57 AD).

Taking advantage of Roman instability during the year of four emperors, Venutius revolted again, this time in 69 AD. Cartimandua appealed for troops from the Romans, who were only able to send auxiliaries. Cartimandua was evacuated and Venutius took the kingdom.

This second revolt may have had wider repercussions: Tacitus says that Vespasian, once emperor, had to "recover" Britain. He also says, introducing the events of the year of four emperors, that Britain was abandoned having only just been pacified (although some think this is in reference to the consolidation of Agricola's later conquests in Caledonia (Scotland)).

What happened to Venutius after the accession of Vespasian is not recorded. Quintus Petillius Cerialis (governor 71 to 74 AD) campaigned against the Brigantes, but they were not completely subdued for many decades: Agricola (governor 78 to 84 AD) appears to have campaigned in Brigantian territory, and both the Roman poet Juvenal and the Greek geographer Pausanias refer to warfare against the Brigantes in the first half of the second century.
