= Publius Ostorius Scapula =

1st century Roman statesman, general and governor of Roman Britain

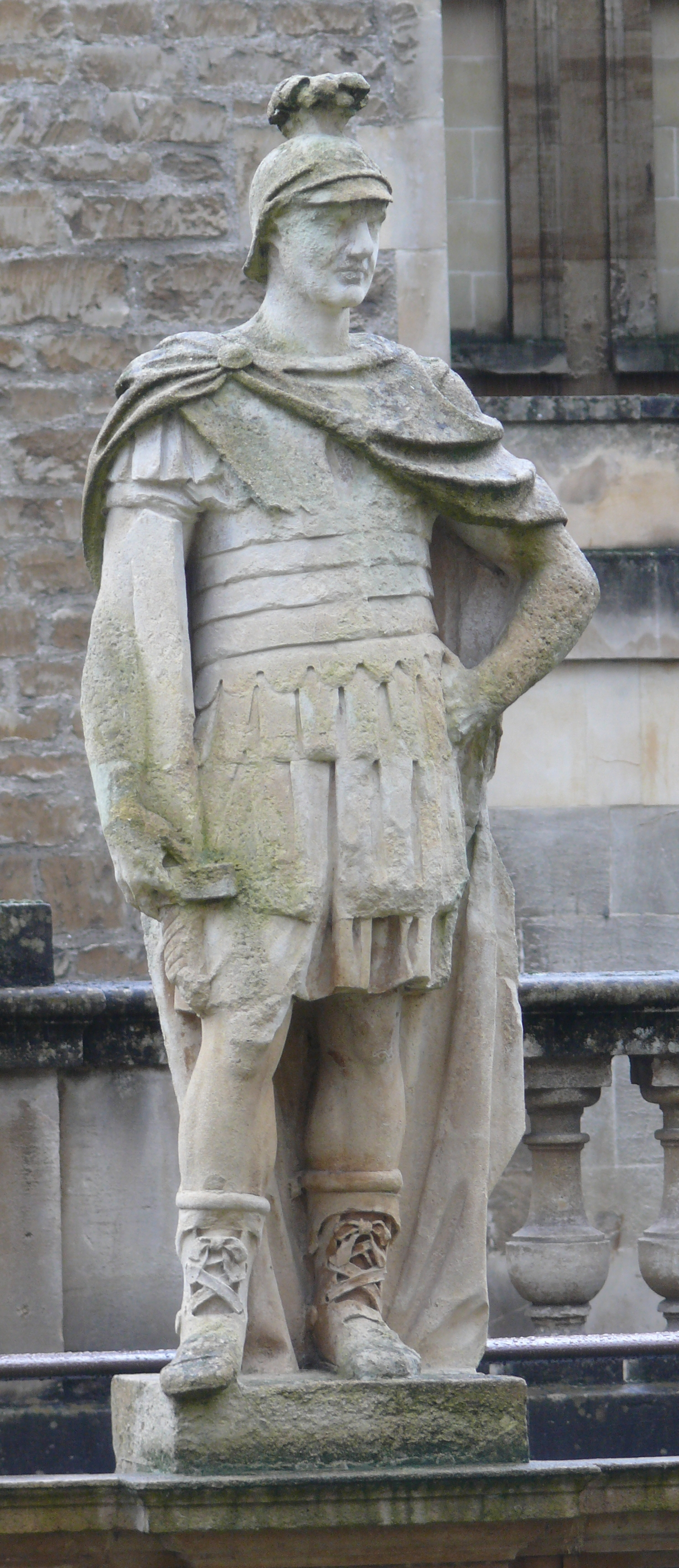
- Publius Ostorius Scapula, modern statue on the terrace of the Roman Baths (Bath)

Governor of Roman Britain
- In office 47 AD – 52 AD
- Preceded by: Aulus Plautius
- Succeeded by: Aulus Didius Gallus

Personal details
- Died: 52 AD
- Occupation: Ancient Roman politician and general

Publius Ostorius Scapula (died 52) was a Roman statesman and general who governed Britain from 47 until his death, and was responsible for the defeat and capture of Caratacus.

== Early life ==
Publius Ostorius Scapula was the son of a Publius and likely the nephew of Quintus Ostorius Scapula, the first joint commander of the Praetorian Guard appointed by Augustus and later prefect of Egypt. The Quintus Ostorius Scapula who was consul in 41 AD was probably his brother or cousin.

== Career ==
Nothing is known of his early career. He was suffect consul, probably in 46. In the winter of 47 he was appointed the second governor of Roman Britain by the emperor Claudius, succeeding Aulus Plautius. The south and east of the island was securely occupied and alliances had been made with tribes outside the Roman-controlled area, but other tribes continued to resist. Believing a new governor would be reluctant to campaign so late in the year, they staged attacks and uprisings.

Ostorius disabused them of this notion and responded vigorously, attacking relentlessly and allowing the native resistance no time to regroup. He apparently (based on an emendation of a corrupt passage in Tacitus's Annals) declared his intention to disarm all the Britons south and east of the rivers Trent and Severn. The geographical area described has led to discussion about the role of the Fosse Way as a desired frontier line during the period, as it links the Trent and the Severn.

The Iceni, a tribe based in Norfolk who had not been conquered but allied themselves with the Romans voluntarily, objected to this plan and led neighbouring tribes in an uprising. Ostorius defeated them by storming a hill fort, possibly Stonea Camp in the Fens near March in Cambridgeshire, in a hard-fought battle. His son, Marcus Ostorius Scapula, won the corona civica for saving a Roman citizen's life during the fighting. The Iceni remained independent, and it is likely that Prasutagus was installed as a pro-Roman ruler at this time.

After putting down the rebellion he began expeditions beyond the frontier, beginning with a productive campaign against the Deceangli tribe in north Wales and the Cheshire Gap in 48. This was an astute move as it divided the tribes of North Britain from those in Wales. He was recalled east however after a new rebellion by a faction of the Brigantes. This was quickly suppressed but revealed the dangers in the Romans' client kingdom system of which the Brigantes were a part; troops from the Legio XIV Gemina were stationed in the area to keep the Brigantian peace. At this time the Legio II Augusta held the command in the south east, the Legio IX Hispana was campaigning the north east beyond the Trent, the Legio XX Valeria Victrix held Colchester and the Legio XIV was based at Wroxeter.

Ostorius initiated further Romanisation during his command in the safer southern lands, founding Britain's first colony of military veterans at Camulodunum (modern Colchester) in 49 and probably establishing a municipium at Verulamium (St Albans). His tactical skill rather than his political acumen was his strength however. He had received a difficult brief as the Claudian lowlands were economically unspectacular and Britain's mineral wealth lay in the barbarian lands instead. Capture of these would have to wait until later years.

In the meantime, Caratacus, whose tribe, the Catuvellauni, had been defeated in the first phase of the conquest, had re-emerged as a leader of the Silures of south east Wales. Their rising was controlled by a programme of legionary fortress construction, driving Caratacus north into the lands of the Ordovices. Ostorius managed to force him into an open conflict, after several years of guerrilla war. They fought a battle, probably near the River Severn and possibly near Caersws, where the Romans defeated the British leader in 51.

The Ordovices had fortified a ridge of steep hills above the river and the difficulty of the terrain behind them made an encircling manoeuvre by the Romans impossible. Although Ostorius was concerned at the seemingly impregnable defences, Tacitus records that the eagerness and loyalty of his troops persuaded him to attack and in the end the Britons were easily defeated. Caratacus' wife and daughter were captured and his brother surrendered while Caratacus himself fled to the territory of the Brigantes. However their queen, Cartimandua, was loyal to Rome and handed him over in chains.

After the battle, Ostorius was honoured with triumphal insignia but the victory did not entirely quell resistance in the Welsh borders. The Silures especially continued to harass Roman troops, supposedly after Ostorius had publicly said that they posed such a danger that they should be either exterminated or transplanted. A large legionary force occupied in building forts in Silurian territory was surrounded and attacked and only rescued with difficulty and considerable loss. This violent desperation on the part of the Silures can be attributed to their reaction to what Peter Salway calls Ostorius' lack of political judgment. The Silures had been galvanised by Ostorius' ill-thought out threats to destroy them and began taking Roman prisoners as hostages and distributing them amongst their neighbouring tribes. This had the effect of binding them all together and creating a new resistance movement.

Ostorius died unexpectedly in 52, supposedly "worn out with care" as Tacitus puts it, leaving Rome with a growing problem on its British frontiers. It has been claimed that his final resting place is in Clawdd Coch in the Vale of Glamorgan, southeast Wales. Silurian raids continued, defeating a legion led by Gaius Manlius Valens, before Aulus Didius Gallus arrived as replacement governor. The complete pacification of the area was achieved only 25 years later by Sextus Julius Frontinus.

== Family ==
A Sallustia Calvina is attested as the wife of a Publius Ostorius Scapula, possibly the governor or his father, if the wife of the governor she might have been the daughter of Gaius Sallustius Passienus Crispus and Junia Calvina.

== Notes ==
Political offices
Preceded by Aulus Plautius	Roman governors of Britain; AD 47–52	Succeeded by Aulus Didius Gallus
