= Brigantes =

British tribe of the Iron Age and Roman era

Geography
- Capital: Isurium Brigantum (Aldborough)
- Location: Cheshire; Cumberland; County Durham; Derbyshire; Northumberland; Nottinghamshire; Lancashire; Staffordshire; Westmorland; Yorkshire
- Rulers: Cartimandua, Venutius, Vellocatus

The Brigantes were a tribe or confederation of Celtic Britons who dwelt in what is now Northern England during the Iron Age and Roman era. Their territory, often referred to as Brigantia, was probably the largest of the British tribes and was centred on the Pennines and what is now Yorkshire. In the Roman era the capital was Isurium Brigantum (Aldborough), and the city of Eboracum (York) was within their territory. They are also associated with Stanwick fort. Prominent leaders named in Roman sources were queen Cartimandua and king Venutius.

The Brigantes may have included sub-tribes such as the Setantii and Textoverdi. Brigantia was bordered by the territories of four other tribes: the Carvetii in the northwest, the Parisii to the east and, to the south, the Corieltauvi and the Cornovii. To the north was the territory of the Votadini. The Greek geographer Ptolemy also named the Brigantes as a people on the south coast of Ireland, while the Brigantii are named by Strabo as a people in the Alps.

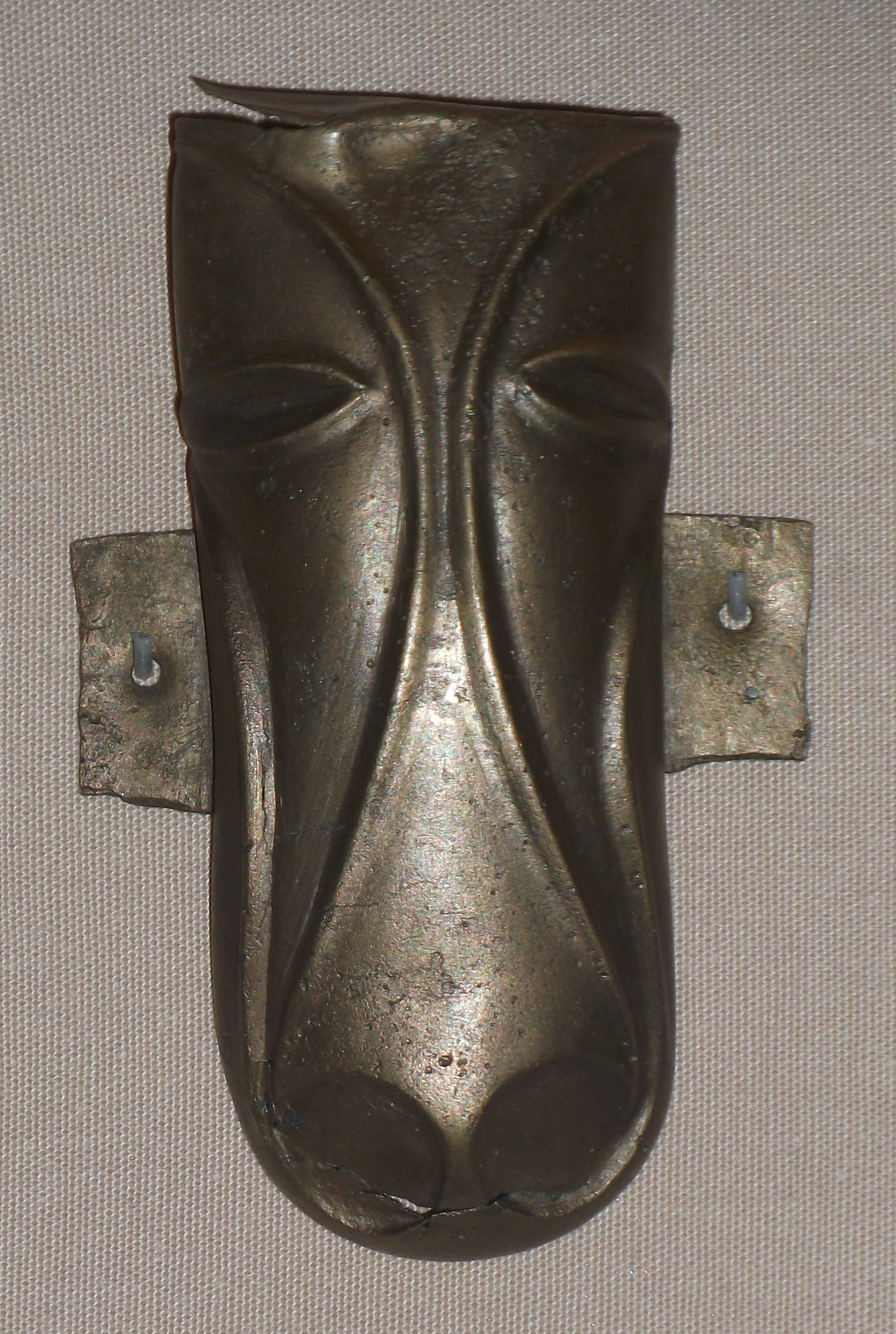
The Stanwick Horse Mask, 1st century AD

== Etymology ==
The name Brigantes (Βρίγαντες in Ancient Greek) shares the same Proto-Celtic root as the goddess Brigantia, *brigantī, brigant- meaning 'high, elevated', and it is unclear whether settlements called Brigantium were so named as 'high ones' in a metaphorical sense of nobility, or literally as 'highlanders', or inhabitants of physically elevated fortifications. The reconstructed Proto-Indo-European root is *bʰerǵʰ-. The word is related to Germanic *Burgund, Burgundī and Iranian Alborz (Old Iranian Hara Berezaiti).

In modern Welsh, the word braint means 'privilege, prestige' and comes from the same root *brigantī. Other related forms from the modern Celtic languages are: Welsh brenin 'king' (< brigantīnos); Welsh/Cornish/Breton bri 'prestige, reputation, honour, dignity', Scottish Gaelic brìgh 'pith, power', Irish brí 'energy, significance', Manx bree 'power, energy' (all < *brīg-/brigi-); and Welsh/Cornish/Breton bre 'hill' (< brigā). The name Bridget from Old Irish Brigit (Modern Irish Bríd) also comes from *Brigantī, as does the English river name Brent and the connected area Brentford.

There were several ancient settlements named Brigantium around Europe, corresponding to modern places (many with cognate names), including Berganza in Álava (Spain), A Coruña and Bergantiños in Galicia (Spain), Bragança and Braga in Portugal, Briançon in France, Brigetio on the border of Slovakia and Hungary, Brigobanne situated on the Breg River and near the Brigach river in south Germany (pre-Roman Vindelicia) Bregenz in the Austrian Alps, and Brianza in Italy.

In chronostratigraphy, the British sub-stage of the Carboniferous period, the Brigantian, derives its name from the Brigantes.

== History ==
Romano-Brigantian theatrical mask

There are no written records of the Brigantes before the Roman conquest of Britain; it is therefore hard to assess how long they had existed as a political entity prior to that. Most key archaeological sites in the region seem to show continued, undisturbed occupation from an early date, so their rise to power may have been gradual rather than a sudden, dramatic conquest, or it may be linked to the burning of the large hill fort at Castle Hill, Huddersfield, c. 430 BC. Territorially the largest tribe in Britain, the Brigantes encompassed sub-tribes or septs such as the Gabrantovices on the Yorkshire Coast, and the Textoverdi in the upper valley of the River South Tyne near Hadrian's Wall. The names Portus Setantiorum and Coria Lopocarum suggest other groups, the Setantii and the Lopocares located on the Lancashire coast and the River Tyne respectively. A name Corionototae is also recorded but since the name seems to derive from *Corion Toutas meaning "tribal army" or "people's army" it may have been a name for a military force or resistance against the Romans rather than any tribe or sub-tribe. The Carvetii who occupied what is now Cumbria may have been another sub-tribe, or they may have been separate from the Brigantes. This is often disputed as the Carvetii made up a separate civitas under Roman rule.

=== Roman era ===
During the Roman invasion, in 47 AD, the governor of Britain, Publius Ostorius Scapula, was forced to abandon his campaign against the Deceangli of North Wales because of "disaffection" among the Brigantes, whose leaders had been allies of Rome. A few of those who had taken up arms were killed and the rest were pardoned. In 51, the defeated resistance leader Caratacus sought sanctuary with the Brigantian queen, Cartimandua, but she showed her loyalty to the Romans by handing him over in chains. She and her husband Venutius are described as loyal and "defended by Roman arms", but they later divorced, Venutius taking up arms first against his ex-wife, then her Roman protectors. During the governorship of Aulus Didius Gallus (52–57) he gathered an army and invaded her kingdom. The Romans sent troops to defend Cartimandua, and they defeated Venutius' rebellion. After the divorce, Cartimandua married Venutius' armour-bearer, Vellocatus, and raised him to the kingship. Venutius staged another rebellion in 69, taking advantage of Roman instability in the Year of the Four Emperors. This time the Romans were only able to send auxiliaries, who succeeded in evacuating Cartimandua but left Venutius and his anti-Roman supporters in control of the kingdom.

The extensive Iron Age fortifications at Stanwick in North Yorkshire were excavated in the 1950s by Mortimer Wheeler who concluded that Venutius probably had this site as his capital, but Durham University's later excavations from 1981 to 1986 led Colin Haselgrove and Percival Turnbull to suggest a slightly earlier dating with Stanwick a centre of power for Cartimandua instead.

After the accession of Vespasian, Quintus Petillius Cerialis was appointed governor of Britain and the conquest of the Brigantes was begun. It seems to have taken many decades to complete. Gnaeus Julius Agricola (governor 78–84) appears to have engaged in warfare in Brigantian territory. Tacitus, in a speech put into the mouth of the Caledonian leader Calgacus, refers to the Brigantes, "under a woman's leadership", almost defeating the Romans. The Roman poet Juvenal, writing in the early 2nd century, depicts a Roman father urging his son to win glory by destroying the forts of the Brigantes. There appears to have been a rebellion in the north sometime in the early reign of Hadrian, but details are unclear. A rising of the Brigantes has often been posited as the explanation for the disappearance of the Ninth Legion, stationed at York. It is possible that one of the purposes of Hadrian's Wall (begun in 122) was to keep the Brigantes from making discourse with the tribes in what is now the lowlands of Scotland on the other side. The emperor Antoninus Pius (138–161) is said by Pausanias to have defeated them after they began an unprovoked war against Roman allies, perhaps as part of the campaign that led to the building of the Antonine Wall (142–144).

== Settlements ==
Ptolemy named nine principal poleis (cities) or towns belonging to the Brigantes; these were:

Latin name	Modern name	Modern County
Epiacum	Whitley Castle, Alston	Northumberland
Vinovium	Binchester	County Durham
Caturactonium	Catterick	North Yorkshire
Calatum	Burrow, Lonsdale	Lancashire
Isurium Brigantum	Aldborough	North Yorkshire
Rigodunum	Unknown^{[a]}	Greater Manchester
Olicana or Olenacum	Ilkley^{[b]}	West Yorkshire
Eboracum	City of York	North Yorkshire
Cambodunum	Unknown^{[c]}	West Yorkshire

^{^{a} Rigodunum is most likely Castleshaw’s Roman Fort in Greater Manchester.}
^{^{b} Olenacum is traditionally thought to be Ilkley’s Roman Fort, West Yorkshire, but is now thought to be a predecessor of Elslack.}
^{^{c} Cambodunum is most likely the Slack Roman Fort near Outlane, West Yorkshire.}

Other settlements known in Brigantian territory include:

- Wincobank, on the border of Sheffield
- Bremetenacum Veteranorum (Ribchester, Lancashire)
- Calcaria (Tadcaster, North Yorkshire) – mentioned in the Antonine Itinerary and the Ravenna Cosmography
- Luguvalium (Carlisle, Cumbria) – probably a settlement of the Carvetii
- Coria (Corbridge, Northumberland) – perhaps a settlement of the Lopocares

== Brigantes in Ireland ==
The Brigantes are attested in Ireland as well as Britain in Ptolemy's 2nd century Geographia, but it is not clear what link, if any, existed between the Irish and the British Brigantes. T. F. O'Rahilly proposed that the Irish branch was the origin of the later Uí Bairrche clan, believing that they belonged to the Érainn (Ptolemy's Iverni) who he hypothesized were originally descendant from the Gaulish and British Belgae according to his model of Irish prehistory. Professor John T. Koch posits links between the British and Irish groups, identifying the Romano-British goddess Brigantia with the Irish Brigid and pointing to a possibly Roman or Romano-British burial in Stonyford, County Kilkenny. He identifies the Irish Brigantes with the early mediaeval Uí Brigte clan.

== In popular culture ==
- The 2010 film Centurion follows the destiny of the Ninth Legion, seen from the perspective of centurion Quintus Dias. Both the Ninth and Dias become embroiled in the machinations of Etain (Olga Kurylenko), a Brigantes warrior, acting as a scout, when she subsequently betrays them to the Picts.
- In the 1954 novel The Eagle of the Ninth by Rosemary Sutcliff, one of the main characters is Esca, the captured son of a chieftain of the Brigantes, who travels with the Roman soldier Marcus Aquila north of Hadrian's Wall to discover what happened to the Legio IX Hispana. The character was played by Christian Rodska in the 1977 BBC adaptation and Jamie Bell in the 2011 film adaptation The Eagle.
- In 2020, the English rugby league club, Wigan Warriors, referenced a Brigantian warrior in their new club logo claiming that the Brigantes "had roots and lineage in the town of Wigan".
- The 1982 science fiction novel Battlefield Earth, by L. Ron Hubbard, includes a group of minor characters in the distant future who call themselves the Brigantes. They are presented as savage and treacherous bandit mercenaries and cannibals from Zimbabwe in Africa, led by a man called “Snith” but with no connection to the historical Brigantes other than descending from British colonists. The meaning of their name is never explained, but is possibly related to the word “brigand.”
