= Ruffinelli =

Ruffinelli is a surname, originally from Italy.

== Origins ==
Ruffinelli is a patronymic surname derived from the personal name Rufino (the Italian form of Rufinus, as borne by Rufinus of Assisi), in combination with the plural suffix -elli to indicate the 'descendants of Rufino'.

== Notable people ==
Notable people with the surname include:

- Jorge Ruffinelli (1943–2026), Uruguayan academic and critic
- Luis Ruffinelli (1889–1973), Paraguayan playwright, journalist, and political activist
- Mikel Ruffinelli (born 1972), American woman, notable for wide hips
