= Legio IX Hispana =

Roman legion

- Map of the Roman Empire in AD 125, under emperor Hadrian, showing the IX Hispana's last attested location at Noviomagus Batavorum on the Rhine (Nijmegen, Netherlands)
- Active: Before 58 BC to sometime in the AD 2nd century
- Country: Roman Republic and Roman Empire
- Type: Roman legion (Marian)
- Role: Infantry assault
- Size: c. 5,400
- Garrison/HQ: Hispania Tarraconensis 41–c. 13 BC; ? Pannonia AD 9–43; Eboracum (Britannia) 71–c. 121; ? Noviomagus (Germania Inferior) c. 121–133/134
- Nickname: The Lost Legion
- Mascot: Bull
- Engagements: Gallic Wars (58–51 BC); Cantabrian Wars (29–19 BC); Roman conquest of Britain; Boudican revolt; Battle of Mons Graupius

Commanders
- Notable commanders: Julius Caesar; Quintus Petillius Cerialis; Gnaeus Julius Agricola

Legio IX Hispana (“Ninth Legion Hispana”), also written as Legio VIIII Hispana, was a legion of the Imperial Roman army that existed from the late 1st century BC until at least AD 120. The legion served in several provinces during the late Roman Republic and early Roman Empire. It acquired the nickname “Hispana” after being stationed in Hispania under Augustus. Following the Roman invasion of Britain in AD 43, the legion was stationed in the province. It disappears from surviving Roman records after around AD 120, and no ancient source provides a definitive account of its fate.

The uncertain fate of the legion has been the subject of considerable historical research and speculation. One theory, associated particularly with the historian Theodor Mommsen, held that the legion was destroyed in northern Britain soon after AD 108, the date of the latest securely dated inscription of the Ninth found in Britain. Under this interpretation, the legion may have been destroyed during a revolt by northern British tribes against Roman rule. The theory was popularised by Rosemary Sutcliff's 1954 historical novel The Eagle of the Ninth, in which the legion marches into Caledonia (modern Scotland) and subsequently disappears.

The traditional theory was challenged by the discovery of further inscriptions referring to IX Hispana at the legionary base at Nijmegen in the Netherlands. These finds have been interpreted as evidence that the legion, or at least part of it, was stationed there around AD 120, after the date at which it was traditionally thought to have been destroyed in Britain. The Nijmegen evidence has therefore led some scholars to propose that the legion survived beyond its period in Britain and was destroyed during a later conflict in the 2nd century. Proposed contexts include the Bar Kokhba revolt in Judaea (AD 132–135) and the Roman–Parthian War of AD 161–166, although neither explanation is established. Other scholars have argued that the Nijmegen inscriptions may refer only to a detachment of IX Hispana rather than to the entire legion.

Whatever its precise fate, IX Hispana had ceased to exist by the reign of the emperor Septimius Severus (AD 193–211). It is absent from two independent but substantially identical lists of the 33 Roman legions existing during his reign.

== Republican army (to 30 BC) ==
The origin of the legion is uncertain, but a 9th legion seems to have participated in the siege of Asculum during the Social War in 90 BC.

When Julius Caesar became governor of Cisalpine Gaul in 58 BC, he inherited four legions, numbered VII, VIII, IX and X, that were already based there. The Ninth (IX) may have been quartered in Aquileia "to guard against attacks from the Illyrians". Caesar created two more legions (XI and XII), using all six for his attack on the Helvetii, initiating the Gallic Wars.

The Caesarian Ninth Legion fought in the battles of Dyrrhachium and Pharsalus (48 BC) and in the African campaign of 46 BC. After his final victory Caesar disbanded the legion and settled the veterans in the area of Picenum.

Following Caesar's assassination, Caesar's ally Ventidius Bassus made attempts to recreate the 7th, 8th and 9th legions, but "it is not clear that any of these survived even to the time of Philippi".Octavian later recalled the veterans of the Ninth to fight against the rebellion of Sextus Pompeius in Sicily. After defeating Sextus they were sent to the province of Macedonia. The Ninth remained with Octavian in his war of 31 BC against Mark Antony and fought by his side in the Battle of Actium.

== Imperial Roman army (30 BC – AD 130?) ==
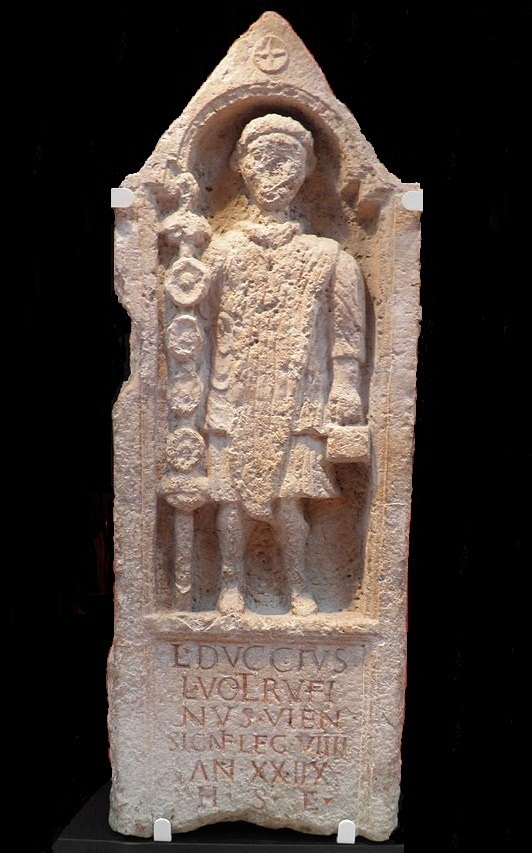
Memorial to Lucius Duccius Rufinus, a standard bearer of the Ninth Legion (LEG VIIII), in the Yorkshire Museum, York

With Octavian, whom the Senate later titled Augustus, established as sole ruler of the Roman world, the legion was sent to Hispania to take part in the large-scale campaign against the Cantabrians (25–19 BC). The nickname Hispana ("stationed in Hispania") is first found during the reign of Augustus and probably originated at that time.

After that the legion was probably part of the imperial army in the Rhine borderlands that was campaigning against the Germanic tribes. Following the abandonment of the eastern Rhine area (after the disastrous Battle of the Teutoburg Forest in AD 9), the Ninth was relocated to Pannonia.

=== Britain (AD 43 – at least 108) ===
In AD 43 the legion most likely participated in the Roman invasion of Britain led by the emperor Claudius and general Aulus Plautius, because they soon appear amongst the provincial garrison. In AD 50 the Ninth was one of two legions that defeated the forces of Caratacus. Around the same year, the legion constructed a fort, Lindum Colonia, now Lincoln. Under the command of Caesius Nasica they put down the first revolt of Venutius, king of the Brigantes tribe, between 52 and 57.

The Ninth suffered a serious defeat at the Battle of Camulodunum under Quintus Petillius Cerialis in the rebellion of Boudica (61), when most of the foot-soldiers were killed in a disastrous attempt to relieve the besieged city of Camulodunum (Colchester). Only the cavalry escaped. The legion was later reinforced with legionaries from the Germania provinces. When Cerialis returned as governor of Britain ten years later, he took command of the Ninth once more in a successful campaign against the Brigantes in 71–72, to subdue north-central Britain. Around this time, they constructed a new fortress at York (Eboracum), as shown by finds of tile-stamps from the site.

The Ninth participated in Agricola's invasion of Caledonia (modern Scotland) in 82–83. According to Tacitus, the legion narrowly escaped destruction when the Caledonians beyond the Forth launched a surprise attack at night on their fort. The Caledonians "burst upon them as they were terrified in their sleep". In desperate hand-to-hand fighting, the Caledonians entered the camp, but Agricola was able to send cavalry to relieve the legion. Seeing the relief force, "the men of the Ninth Legion recovered their spirit, and sure of their safety, fought for glory", pushing back the Caledonians. The legion also participated in the decisive Battle of Mons Graupius.

The last attested activity of the Ninth in Britain is during the rebuilding in stone of the legionary fortress at York (Eboracum) in 108. This is recorded in an inscribed stone tablet discovered in 1864, now displayed in the Yorkshire Museum in York. (Note: Campbell, D.B. (2010). "The fate of the Ninth: The curious disappearance of the VIIII Legio Hispana" (PDF). Ancient Warfare. Vol. IV, no. 5. pp. 48–53. see also Campbell (2018) – expanded paperback version)

=== Germania Inferior (108? – 130?) ===
Several inscriptions attesting IX Hispana have been found in the site of the legionary fortress on the lower Rhine river at Noviomagus Batavorum (Nijmegen, Netherlands). These include some tile-stamps (dated 104–120); and a silver-plated bronze pendant, found in the 1990s, that was part of a phalera (military medal), with "LEG HISP IX" inscribed on the reverse. In addition, an altar to Apollo, dating from this period, was found at nearby Aquae Granni (Aachen, Germany), erected in fulfillment of a vow, by Lucius Latinius Macer, who describes himself as primus pilus (chief centurion) and as praefectus castrorum ("prefect of the camp", i.e. third-in-command) of IX Hispana. (it was commonplace for chief centurions, on completion of their single-year term of office, to be promoted to praefectus castrorum).

The archaeological evidence thus appears to indicate that elements of IX Hispana were present at Noviomagus sometime after AD 104 (when the previous incumbent legion, X Gemina, was transferred to the Danube) and that IX was probably replaced by a detachment of legion XXX Ulpia Victrix not long after AD 120. Less clear is whether the whole IX legion was at Nijmegen or simply a detachment. The evidence for the presence of senior officers such as Macer convinced several scholars that the Ninth Legion as a whole was based there between 121 and 130. It may have been both: first a detachment, later followed by the rest of the legion: a vexillatio Britannica ("British detachment") is also attested at Nijmegen in this period. However, it is unclear whether this detachment was drawn from the IX Hispana (and its attached auxiliary regiments) alone, or from a mix of various British-based units.

== Theories about the Ninth's disappearance ==
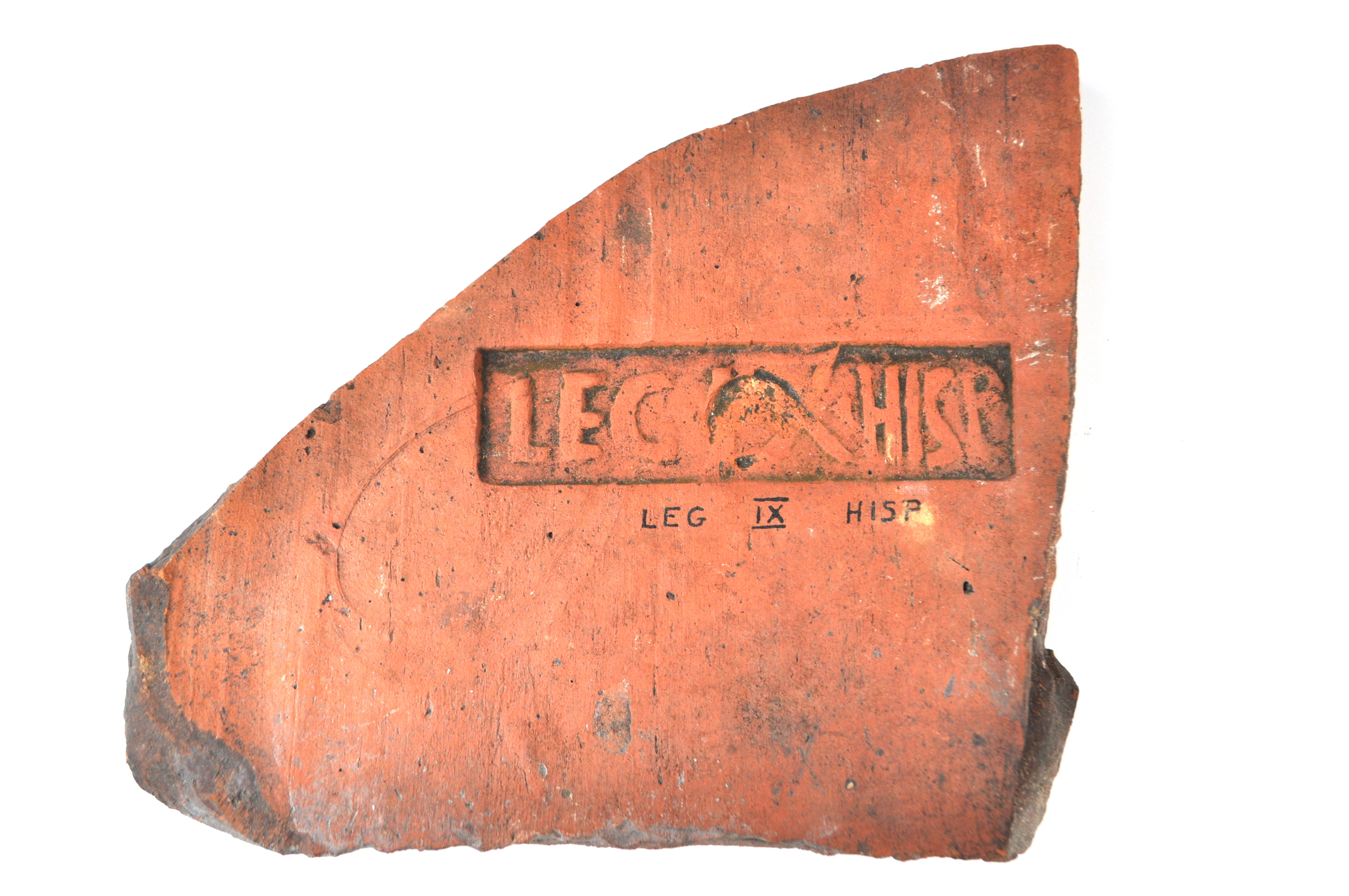
A stamp of the Ninth legion from the fortress at Caerleon in south Wales.

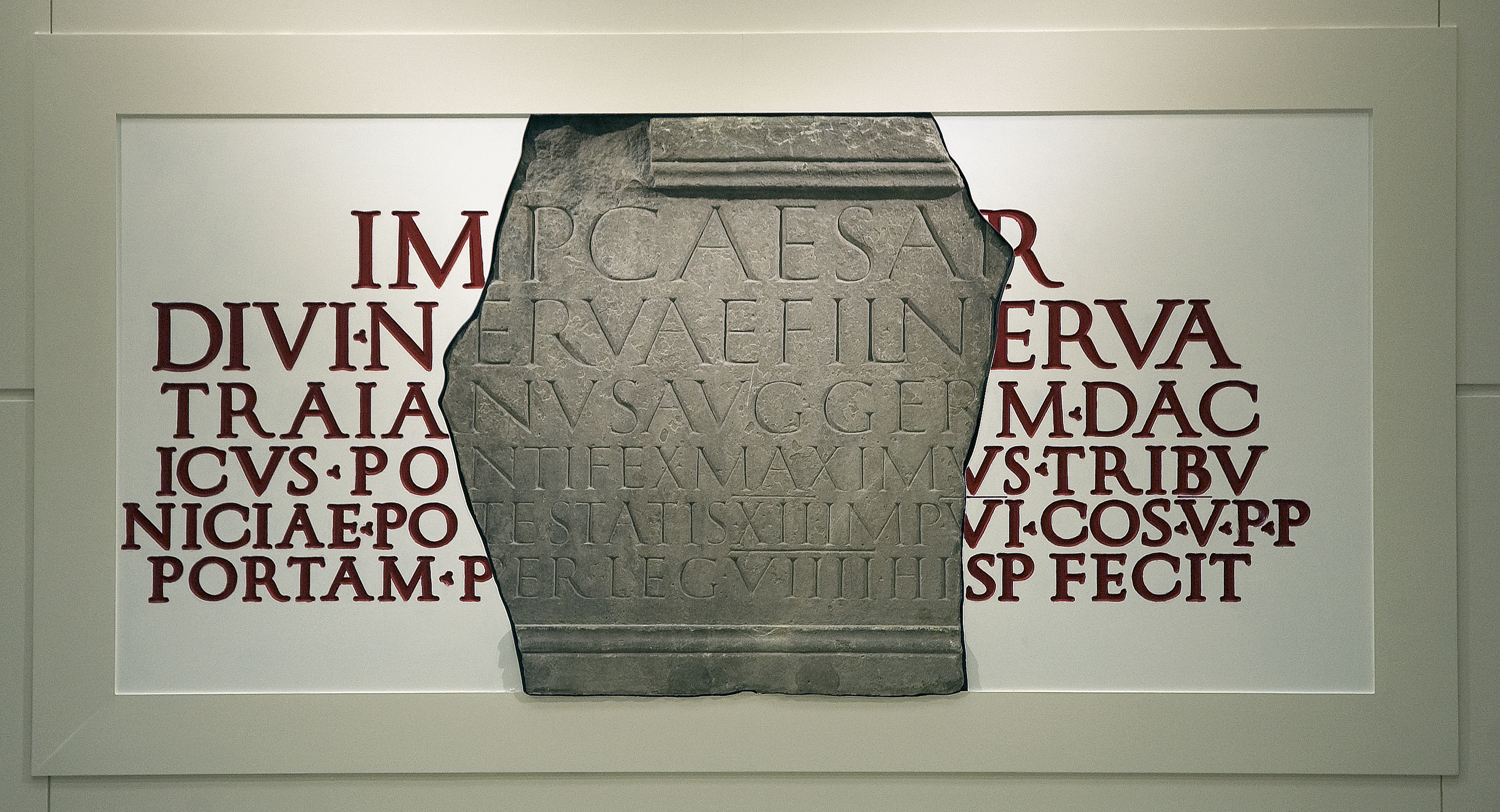
The last definite attestation to the Legion is a stone inscription from Eboracum dated 108. The inscription reads:
'The Emperor Caesar, son of the divine Nerva, Nerva Traianus Augustus, Germanicus, Dacicus, pontifex maximus, in his twelfth year of tribunician power, five times acclaimed Imperator, five times consul, father of his country, made this gateway by agency of the Ninth Legion Hispana' (Yorkshire Museum, York)

The Nijmegen finds, dating to c. 120, were (as of 2015) the latest records of Legion IX found. The Ninth was apparently no longer in existence after 197. Two lists of the legions survive from this era, one inscribed on a column found in Rome (CIL VI 3492) and the other a list of legions in existence "today" provided by the contemporary Greco-Roman historian Dio Cassius, writing c. 210–232 (Roman History LV.23–24). Both these lists date from after 197, as both include the 3 Parthica legions founded by Septimius Severus in that year. Both lists provide an identical list of 33 legions. Neither includes a "IX Hispana". It thus appears that IX Hispana disappeared sometime in the period 120–197.

The traditional theory is that the Ninth was destroyed in a war on Britain's northern frontier against the indigenous Celtic tribes. According to the eminent 19th-century German classicist Theodor Mommsen, "under Hadrian there was a terrible catastrophe here, apparently an attack on the fortress of Eboracum [York] and the annihilation of the legion stationed there, the very same Ninth that had fought so unluckily in the Boudican revolt." He suggested that a revolt of the Brigantes soon after 108 was the most likely explanation. Mommsen cited as evidence the Roman historian Marcus Cornelius Fronto, writing in the AD 160s, who told the emperor Marcus Aurelius: "Indeed, when your grandfather Hadrian held imperial power, what great numbers of soldiers were killed by the Jews, what great numbers by the Britons". The emperor Hadrian (r. 117–138) visited Britain in person around AD 122, when he launched the construction of Hadrian's Wall because, according to one Roman source, "the Britons could not be kept under Roman control". It is plausible that Hadrian was responding to a military disaster. However, there is no archaeological evidence of it around 120.

Mommsen's thesis was published long before the first traces of IX Hispana were found at Nijmegen. As a result of these, and of inscriptions proving that two senior officers, who were deputy commanders of the Ninth in c. 120, lived on for several decades to lead distinguished public careers, led to the Mommsen theory falling out of favour with many scholars. These now suggest later conflicts in other theatres as possible scenes of IX Hispana's demise:

1. The Second Jewish Revolt against the Romans in Judea that broke out in 132. It was reported that the Romans suffered heavy casualties in this war, whose start-date fits neatly with the estimated time of IX Hispana's departure from Nijmegen (120–130). In this scenario, the Ninth may have been dispatched to Judea to reinforce the locally based legions, but was heavily defeated by Judean forces and the remnants of the unit disbanded. However, another legion, XXII Deiotariana, normally based in Egypt, is actually documented in Judea at this time and its surviving datable records also cease c. 120. It is possible that both legions were destroyed by the Judeans, but if so this would rate as the worst Roman military disaster since the Battle of the Teutoburg Forest (AD 9) when 3 legions were lost.
2. The emperor Marcus Aurelius' Parthian War (161–166) against King Vologases IV. According to the Greco-Roman historian Cassius Dio, a Parthian army led by general Chosroes surrounded and annihilated an unspecified Roman legion in Armenia. This led to the suicide of its commander, the governor of Cappadocia, Marcus Sedatius Severianus. At this time, there were two legions permanently stationed in Cappadocia, the XII Fulminata and the XV Apollinaris. Both these units are attested as operational well beyond AD 200, so neither could have been the legion destroyed by the Parthians. The theory that the Ninth was the lost legion has the drawback that there is a complete lack of evidence that the Ninth was present in the East in the period 130–160. Some scholars argue that the legion referred to by Dio was the XXII Deiotariana, but if so, the latter could not have been annihilated by the Judeans thirty years earlier.

Several scholars continue to argue that destruction in Britain is the most likely scenario for the Ninth's disappearance. Russell argues that "by far the most plausible answer to the question 'what happened to the Ninth' is that they fought and died in Britain, disappearing in the late 110s or early 120s when the province was in disarray". Such scholars criticise the assumptions of those who extrapolate from inscription evidence, arguing that it is easy to confuse evidence about different persons with the same name. It is highly unlikely that if the legion continued in existence up to the Armenian war of 161, no records at all later than c. 120 would be known. Keppie says that "no inscriptions recording the building activities of the legion or the lives and careers of its members have come from the East", suggesting that if the legion did leave Britain, it ceased to exist very soon afterwards. Russell argues that "there is no evidence that the Ninth were ever taken out of Britain." He has claimed that the tile stamps found at Nijmegen cannot be dated to the period after 120, but "all seem to date to the AD 80s, when detachments of the Ninth were indeed on the Rhine fighting Germanic tribes." Keppie also says that the tiles cannot be securely dated, but suggests that they date from c. 105 during a temporary absence of the legion from Britain. However, Keppie does not support the theory that the legion met its end in Britain. He suggests that the legion may have been withdrawn from York around 117 to take part in the war in Parthia at the end of Trajan's reign. Keppie suggests that it was the legion's absence elsewhere that encouraged a native uprising, obliging Hadrian to send the Legio VI Victrix to Britain.

The fate of the Ninth remains the subject of vigorous debate among scholars. Frere noted that "further evidence is needed before more can be said".

== Known members ==
Name	Rank	Time frame	Province	Source
Publius Cornelius Lentulus Scipio	legatus legionis	c. 22	Africa	CIL V, 4329 = ILS 940
Caesius Nasica	legatus legionis	c. 50	Britannia	Tacitus, Annales, XII.40
Quintus Petillius Cerialis	legatus legionis	59–61	Britannia	Tacitus, Agricola 7, 8, 17; Annales XIV.32
Gaius Caristanius Fronto	legatus legionis	c. 76–79	Britannia	ILS 9485
Lucius Aninius Sextius Florentinus	legatus legionis	118–121	Britannia	CIL III, 87
Lucius Duccius Rufinus	standard-bearer	71-125	Britannia	Tombstone, RIB 673
Titus	tribunus laticlavius	c. 60	Britannia	Suetonius, Divus Titus 4.1
Lucius Roscius Aelianus Maecius Celer	tribunus laticlavius	83	Britannia	CIL XIV, 3612
Lucius Burbuleius Optatus Ligarianus	tribunus laticlavius	c. 118-122	Germania Inferior	CIL X, 6006
Lucius Aemilius Carus	tribunus laticlavius	c. 123	Germania Inferior	CIL VI, 1333 = ILS 1077
Lucius Novius Crispinus Martialis Saturninus	tribunus laticlavius	c. 125	Britannia	CIL VIII, 2747
Quintus Camurius Numisius Junior	tribunus laticlavius	c. 145	Britannia	CIL XI, 5670

== Epigraphic inscriptions ==
- Monumentum / (...) Quirina Quintillus miles legionis IX Hispanae annorum (...) Pisoni filius posuit (...). Leon (Legionem)

== In popular culture ==
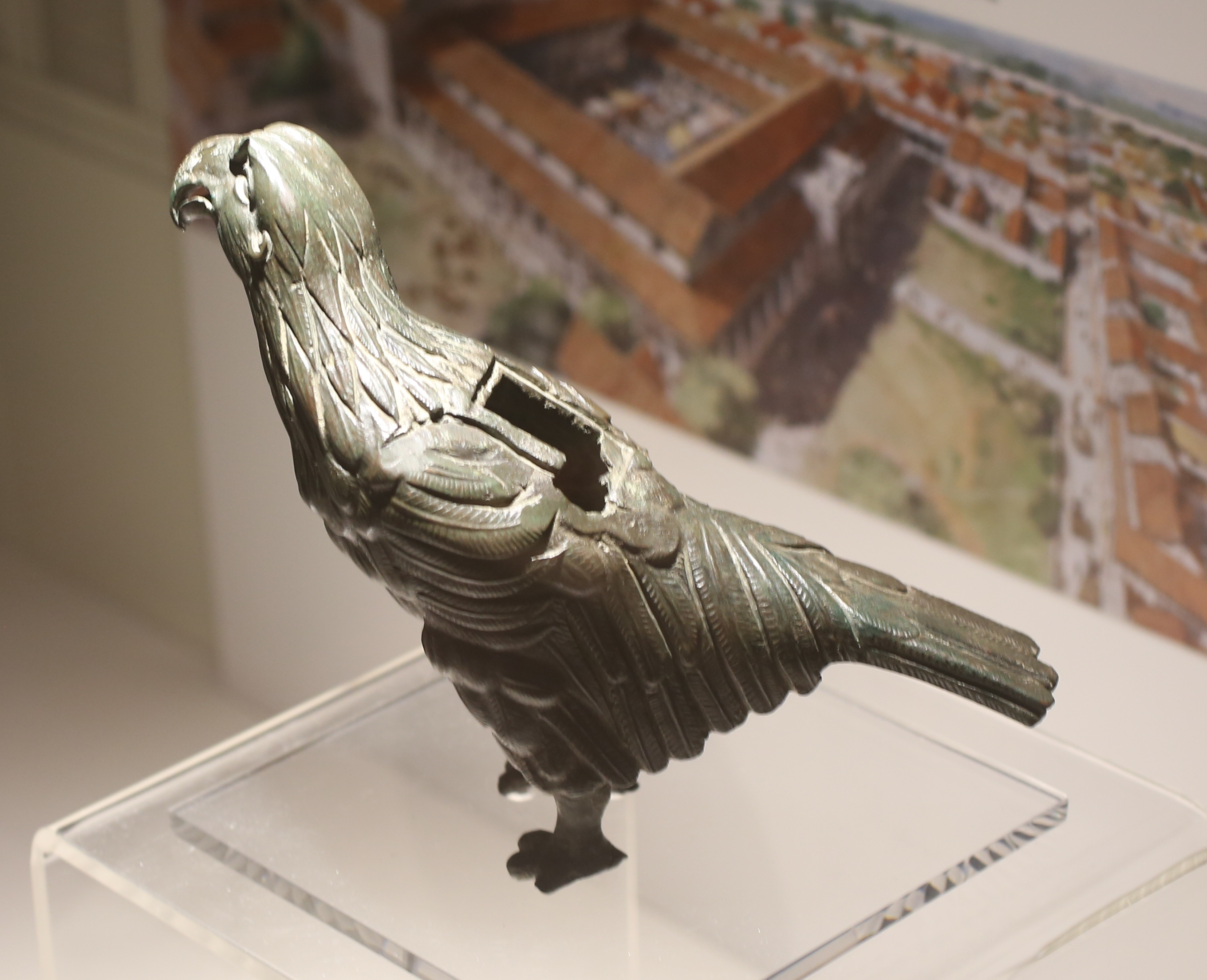
The Silchester eagle, the Roman eagle that inspired Sutcliff's novel. According to Reading Museum, it "is not a legionary eagle but has been immortalized as such by Rosemary Sutcliff".

The Ninth Legion's mysterious disappearance has made it a popular subject for historical fiction, fantasy and science fiction.

- In Rosemary Sutcliff's 1954 historical novel The Eagle of the Ninth, a young Roman officer, Marcus Flavius Aquila, is trying to recover the Eagle standard of his father's legion beyond Hadrian's Wall. It has been adapted for radio, television and film many times.
- The 2010 film Centurion follows the destiny of the Ninth Legion, as seen from the perspective of centurion Quintus Dias.
- The fate of the Ninth Legion is part of the plot of Susanna Kearsley’s novel The Shadowy Horses which is set in the Scottish town of Eyemouth.
- The survival of a handful of the Ninth legion was the basis for the plot of Peter Capaldi's Doctor Who episode "The Eaters of Light" (S10.E10), first broadcast on 17 June 2017.

== See also ==
- List of people who disappeared mysteriously (pre-1910)
- List of Roman legions
- Castra
- Limes (Roman Empire)
- Structural history of the Roman military
- Silchester eagle
