= Rufinus =

Rufinus may refer to:

- List of saints named Rufinus, eleven saints named Rufinus in the Roman Martyrology, including:
  - Rufinus of Assisi, 3rd-century saint and martyr
  - Valerius and Rufinus (died 287), Christian martyrs
- Members of the ancient Roman Rufinia gens
- Lucius Duccius Rufinus, a 1st century standard bearer of the 9th Legion
- Tyrannius Rufinus of Aquileia (c. 340–410), Roman monk, historian, and translator
- Rufinus (Roman governor), 3rd century governor of Roman Britain
- Rufinus (consul) (c. 335–395), Eastern Roman statesman
- Rufinus (poet), Greek 3rd or 4th century epigrammist
- Rufinus (relative of Theodosius II), 5th century
- Rufinus (Byzantine official) 5th/6th-centuries Byzantine military officer and emissary
- Rufinus (decretist), 12th-century canon lawyer
- Rufinus Widl (1731–1798), Benedictine monk

== See also ==
- Rufino (disambiguation)
