= Rufino =

Rufino may refer to:

- Rufino (given name)
- Rufino Family, Filipino family
- Rufinus of Assisi, Italian saint sometimes known as Rufino
- Rufino, Santa Fe, Argentina
- Rufino Plaza, Tallest skyscraper in the Philippines

== See also ==
- Ruffino, a wine producer based in the Tuscany region of Italy
- Rufinus (disambiguation)
