= Lucius Novius Crispinus Martialis Saturninus =

Roman senator

Lucius Novius Crispinus Martialis Saturninus was a Roman senator of the second century. He was suffect consul in either 150 or 151 AD. His life is primarily known from inscriptions.

The cursus honorum of Crispinus can be reconstructed from an inscription in Lambaesis. If we can trust the order of offices on this inscription to reflect the order they were held, his first recorded office was sevir equitum Romanorum of the annual review of the equites at Rome. Then came his membership in the quattuorviri viarum curandarum, one of the four boards that comprise the Vigintiviri, a preliminary and required first step toward gaining entry into the Roman Senate. He then received a commission as a military tribune with Legio IX Hispana, then stationed in Roman Britain; Anthony Birley dates this to the mid-120s. At this point Crispinus became a quaestor, and was assigned to assist in the administration of the province of Macedonia. This was followed by the traditional Republican offices of plebeian tribune and praetor; the last is dated around the year 135 at the latest.

Once he left the office of praetor, Crispinus then served as juridicus, or judge, in Asturia and Gallaecia, around the years 136 through 138, then he was commissioned as legatus legionis or commander of Legio I Italica from c. 146 to c. 150. Crispinus was allocated Gallia Narbonensis, which he governed in 144/145, then he was given a second commission to command another legion, III Augusta, from around 146 up until his consulate, which was likely 150.

Crispinus' career after his consulate is a blank; it is yet unknown how much longer he lived.
