= Structural history of the Roman military =

Evolution of ancient Rome's armed forces

The structural history of the Roman military concerns the major transformations in the organization and constitution of ancient Rome's armed forces, "the most effective and long-lived military institution known to history." At the highest level of structure, the forces were split into the Roman army and the Roman navy, although these two branches were less distinct than in many modern national defense forces. Within the top levels of both army and navy, structural changes occurred as a result of both positive military reform and organic structural evolution. These changes can be divided into four distinct phases.

Phase I
The army was derived from obligatory annual military service levied on the citizenry, as part of their duty to the state. During this period, the Roman army would wage seasonal campaigns against largely local adversaries.

Phase II
As the extent of the territories falling under Roman control expanded and the size of the forces increased, the soldiery gradually became salaried professionals. As a consequence, military service at the lower (non-salaried) levels became progressively longer-term. Roman military units of the period were largely homogeneous and highly regulated. The army consisted of units of citizen infantry known as legions (Latin: legiones) as well as non-legionary allied troops known as auxilia. The latter were most commonly called upon to provide light infantry, logistical, or cavalry support.

Phase III
At the height of the Roman Empire's power, forces were tasked with manning and securing the borders of the vast provinces which had been brought under Roman control. Serious strategic threats were less common in this period and emphasis was placed on preserving gained territory. The army underwent changes in response to these new needs and became more dependent on fixed garrisons than on march-camps and continuous field operations.

Phase IV
As Rome began to struggle to keep control over its sprawling territories, military service continued to be salaried and professional for Rome's regular troops. However, the trend of employing allied or mercenary elements was expanded to such an extent that these troops came to represent a substantial proportion of the armed forces. At the same time, the uniformity of structure found in Rome's earlier military disappeared. Soldiery of the era ranged from lightly armed mounted archers to heavy infantry, in regiments of varying size and quality. This was accompanied by a trend in the late empire of an increasing predominance of cavalry rather than infantry troops, as well as a requirement for more mobile operations. In this period there was more focus (on all frontiers but the east) on smaller units of independently-operating troops, engaging less in set-piece battles and more in low-intensity, guerrilla actions.

== Early Roman army ==
=== Tribal forces (c. 752 BC – c. 578 BC) ===
According to the historians Livy and Dionysius of Halicarnassus, writing at a far later date, the earliest Roman army existed in the 8th century BC. During this period Rome itself was probably little more than a fortified hilltop settlement and its army a relatively small force, whose activities were limited "mainly [to] raiding and cattle rustling with the occasional skirmish-like battle". Historian Theodor Mommsen referred to it as Rome's curiate army, named for its presumed subdivision along the boundaries of Rome's three founding tribes (Latin: curiae)), the Ramnians, Tities and Luceres. This army's exact structure is not known, but it is probable that it loosely resembled a warrior band or group of bodyguards led by a chieftain or king. Mommsen believes that Roman military organization of this period was regimented by the "Laws of [the apocryphal] King [V]Italus" but these laws, though referred to by Aristotle, have been lost.

The army (Latin: legio) consisted, according to Livy, of exactly 3,000 infantry and 300 horsemen, one third from each of Rome's three founding tribes. (Note: The eleventh edition of the Encyclopædia Britannica calls Livy's numbers "clearly artificial and invented) Warriors served under six "leaders of division" (Latin: tribuni) who in turn served under a general, usually in the person of the reigning King. Mommsen uses philological arguments and references from Livy and others to suggest that the greater mass of foot-soldiers probably consisted of pilumni (javelin-throwers), with a smaller number possibly serving as arquites (archers). The cavalry was far smaller in number and probably consisted solely of the town's richest citizens. The army may also have contained the earliest form of chariots, hinted at by references to the flexuntes ("the wheelers").

By the beginning of the 7th century BC, the Iron-Age Etruscan civilization (Latin: Etrusci) was dominant in the region. Like most of the other peoples in the region, the Romans warred against the Etruscans. By the close of the century, the Romans had lost their struggle for independence, and the Etruscans had conquered Rome, establishing an absolute monarchy in the city.

=== Etruscan-model hoplites (578 BC – c. 315 BC) ===
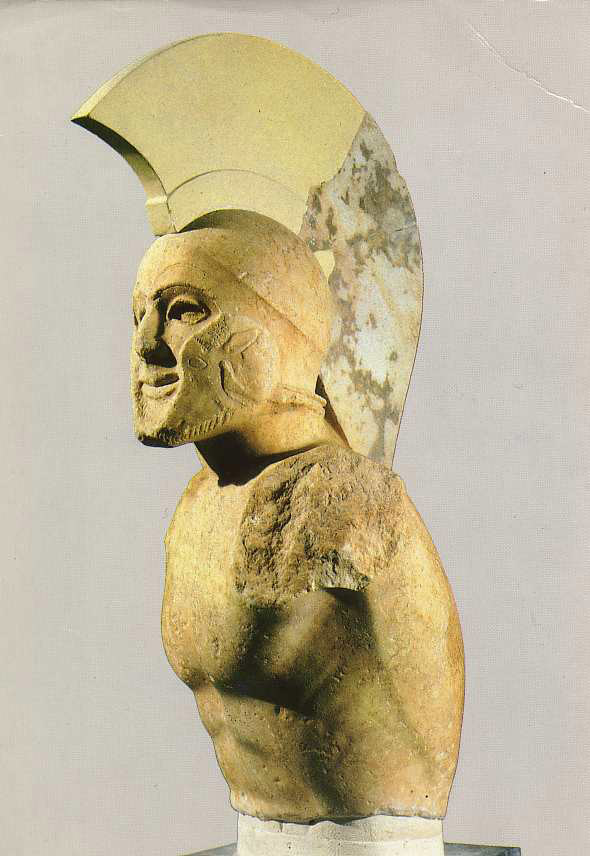
Ancient Greek sculpture of a hoplite (c. 5th century BC, Archæological Museum of Sparti), on which Rome's first class of infantry was based.

Although several Roman sources including Livy and Polybius talk extensively about the Roman army of the Roman Kingdom period that followed the Etruscan capture of the city, no contemporary accounts survive. Polybius, for example, wrote some 300 years after the events in question, and Livy some 500 years later. Additionally, what records were kept by the Romans at this time were later destroyed when the city was sacked. The sources for this period cannot therefore be seen as reliable, as they can be for later military history, e.g. from the First Punic War onwards.

According to our surviving narratives, the three kings of Rome during the Etruscan occupation were Tarquinius Priscus, Servius Tullius, and Tarquinius Superbus. During this period the army underwent a reformation into a centurial army based on socio-economic class. This reformation is traditionally attributed to Servius Tullius, the second of the Etruscan kings. Tullius had earlier carried out the first Roman census of all citizens. Livy tells us that Tullius reformed the army by transplanting onto it the structure derived originally for civil life as a result of this census. At all levels, military service was, at this time, considered to be a civic responsibility and a way of advancing one's status within society.

However, Rome's social classes were qualified rather than created by the census. It is perhaps more accurate to say therefore that the army's structure was slightly refined during this period rather than radically reformed. Prior to these reforms, the infantry was divided into the classis of rich citizens and the infra classem of poorer citizens. The latter were excluded from the regular line of battle on the basis that their equipment was of poor quality. During the reforms, this crude division of poorer and richer citizens was further stratified. The army thereafter consisted of a number of troop types based upon the social class of propertied citizens, collectively known as adsidui. From the poorest in the "fifth class" to the richest in the "first class" and the equestrians above them, military service was compulsory for all. However, Roman citizens at this time generally viewed military service as a proper undertaking of duty to the state, in contrast to later views of military service as an unwelcome and unpleasant burden. Whereas there are accounts of Romans in the late empire mutilating their own bodies in order to exempt themselves from military service, there seems to have been no such reluctance to serve in the military of early Rome. This may in part be due to the generally lower intensity of conflict in this era; to the fact that men were fighting close to and often in protection of their own homes, or due to—as posited by later Roman writers—a greater martial spirit in antiquity. (Note: This viewpoint is echoed in the Encyclopædia Britannica, eleventh edition, which argues that "Much of its strength lay in the same qualities which made the Puritan soldiers of Cromwell terrible—the excellent character of the common soldiers, the rigid discipline, the high training.")

The equestrians, the highest social class of all, served in mounted units known as equites. The first class of the richest citizens served as heavy infantry with swords and long spears (resembling hoplites), and provided the first line of the battle formation. The second class were armed similarly to the first class, but without a breastplate for protection, and with an oblong rather than a round shield. The second class stood immediately behind the first class when the army was drawn up in battle formation. The third and fourth classes were more lightly armed and carried a thrusting-spear and javelins. The third class stood behind the second class in battle formation, normally providing javelin support. The poorest of the propertied men of the city comprised the fifth class. They were generally too poor to afford much equipment at all and were armed as skirmishers with slings and stones. They were deployed in a screen in front of the main army, covering its approach and masking its manoeuvres.

Men without property, who were thereby excluded from the qualifying social classes of the adsidui, were exempted from military service on the grounds that they were too poor to provide themselves with any arms whatsoever. However, in the most pressing circumstances, even these proletarii were pressed into service, though their military worth was probably questionable. Troops in all of these classes would fight together on the battlefield, with the exception of the most senior troops, who were expected to guard the city.

The army is said to have increased from 3,000 to 4,000 men in the 5th century BC, and then again from 4,000 to 6,000 men sometime before 400 BC. This later army of 6,000 men were then divided into 60 centuries of 100 men each.

== Professionalisation during the Republican period ==
=== Manipular legion (315–107 BC) ===
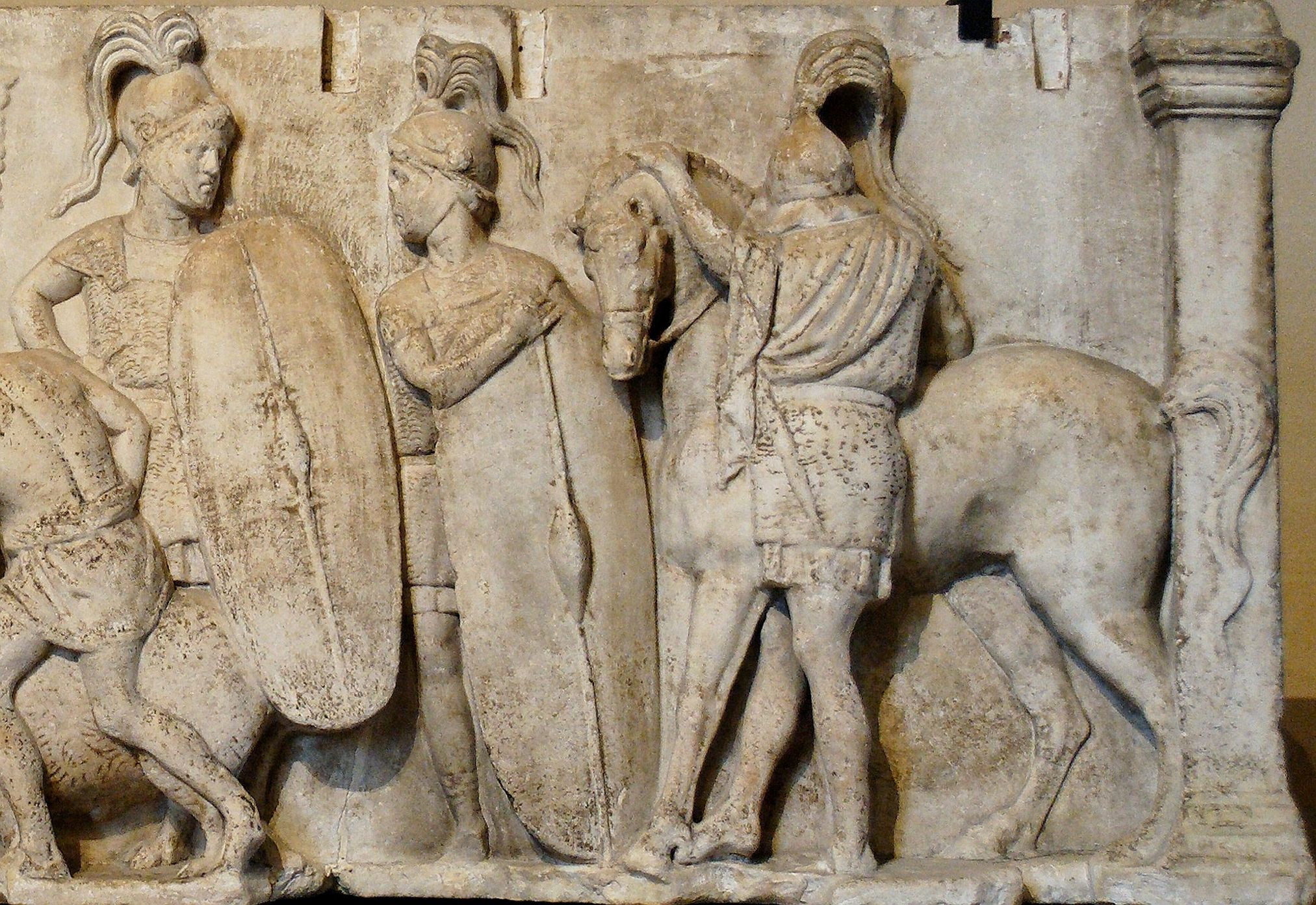
Altar of Domitius Ahenobarbus, c. 122 BC; the altar shows two Roman infantrymen equipped with long scuta and a cavalryman with his horse. All are shown wearing chain mail armour.

The army of the early Republic continued to evolve, and although there was a tendency among Romans to attribute such changes to great reformers, it is more likely that changes were the product of slow evolution rather than singular and deliberate policy of reform. The manipular formation was probably copied from Rome's Samnite enemies to the south, perhaps as a result of Roman defeats in the Second Samnite War.

During this period, a military formation of around 5,000 men was known as a legion (Latin: legio). However, in contrast to later legionary formations of exclusively heavy infantry, the legions of the early and middle Republic consisted of both light and heavy infantry. The term manipular legion, a legion based on units called maniples, is therefore used to contrast the later cohortal legion of the Empire that was based around a system of cohort units. The manipular legion was based partially upon social class and partially upon age and military experience. It therefore represents a theoretical compromise between the earlier class-based army and the class-free armies of later years. In practice, even slaves were at one time pressed into the army of the Republic out of necessity. Normally a single legion was raised each year, but in 366 BC two legions were raised in a single year for the first time.

Maniples were units of 120 men each drawn from a single infantry class. The maniples were small enough to permit tactical movement of individual infantry units on the battlefield within the framework of the greater army. The maniples were typically deployed into three discrete lines (Latin: triplex acies) based on the three heavy infantry types of hastati, principes and triarii. The first type, the hastati, typically formed the first rank in battle formation. They typically wore a brass chest plate (though some could afford mail), a helmet called a galea, and occasionally, greaves (shin guards). They carried an iron bossed wooden shield, 120 cm (4 ft) tall and rectangular in shape with a curved front to partially protect the sides. Traditionally they were armed with a sword known as a gladius and two throwing spears known as pila: one the heavy pilum of popular imagination and one a slender javelin. However the exact introduction of the gladius and the replacement of the spear with the sword as the primary weapon of the Roman legions is uncertain, and it's possible that the early manipular legions still fought with the hastati and principes wielding the hasta or spear.

"the Romans ... habitually enroll four legions each year, each consisting of about four thousand foot and two hundred horse; and when any unusual necessity arises, they raise the number of foot to five thousand and of the horse to three hundred. Of allies, the number in each legion is the same as that of the citizens, but of the horse three times as great"
Polybius, The Histories, 3.107

The second type, the principes, typically formed the second rank of soldiers back from the front of a battle line. They were heavy infantry soldiers armed and armoured as per the hastati. The triarii, who typically formed the third rank when the army was arrayed for battle, were the last remnant of hoplite-style troops in the Roman army. They were armed and armoured as per the principes, with the exception that they carried a pike rather than two pila. A triarii maniple was divided into two formations each six men across by 10 men deep. A manipular legion typically contained between 1,200 hastati, 1,200 principes and 600 triarii. The three classes of unit may have retained some slight parallel to social divisions within Roman society, but at least officially the three lines were based upon age and experience rather than social class. Young, unproven men would serve as hastati, older men with some military experience as principes, and veteran troops of advanced age and experience as triarii.

The heavy infantry of the maniples were supported by a number of light infantry (Latin: velites) and cavalry (Latin: equites) troops, typically 300 horsemen per manipular legion. The cavalry was drawn primarily from the richest class of equestrians, but additional cavalry and light infantry were drawn at times from the socii and Latini of the Italian mainland. The equites were still drawn from the wealthier classes in Roman society. There was an additional class of troops (Latin: accensi, also adscripticii and later supernumerarii) who followed the army without specific martial roles and were deployed to the rear of the triarii. Their role in accompanying the army was primarily to supply any vacancies that might occur in the maniples, but they also seem to have acted occasionally as orderlies to the officers.

The light infantry of 1,200 velites consisted of unarmoured skirmishing troops drawn from the youngest and lower social classes. They were armed with a sword and shield (90 cm (3 ft) diameter), as well as several light javelins, each with a 90 cm (3 ft) wooden shaft the diameter of a finger, with a c. 25 cm (10 in) narrow metal point. Their numbers were swollen by the addition of allied light infantry and irregular rorarii.

The Roman levy of 403 BC was the first to be requested to campaign for longer than a single season, and from this point on such a practice became gradually more common, if still not typical.

A small navy had operated at a fairly low level after the Second Samnite War, but it was massively upgraded during this period, expanding from a few primarily river- and coastal-based patrol craft to a full maritime unit. After a period of frenetic construction, the navy mushroomed to a size of more than 400 ships on the Carthaginian pattern. Once completed, it could accommodate up to 100,000 sailors and embarked troops for battle. The navy thereafter declined in size. This was partially because a pacified Roman Mediterranean called for little naval policing, and partially because the Romans chose to rely during this period on ships provided by Greek cities, whose peoples had greater maritime experience.

==== Proletarianisation of the infantry (217–107 BC) ====
The extraordinary demands of the Punic Wars, in addition to a shortage of manpower, exposed the tactical weaknesses of the manipular legion, at least in the short term. In 217 BC, Rome was forced to effectively ignore its long-standing principle that its soldiers must be both citizens and property owners when slaves were pressed into naval service; around 213 BC, the property requirement was reduced from 11,000 to 4,000 asses. Since the Romans are unlikely to have preferred to employ slaves over poor citizens in their armies, it must be assumed that, at this point, the proletarii of the poorest citizens must also have been pressed into service despite their lack of legal qualification. By 123 BC, the financial requirement for military service was slashed again from 4,000 asses to just 1,500 asses. By this time, therefore, it is clear that many of the property-less former proletarii had been nominally admitted into the adsidui.

During the 2nd century BC, Roman territory saw an overall decline in population, partially due to the huge losses incurred during various wars. This was accompanied by severe social stresses and the greater collapse of the middle classes into lower classes of the census and the proletarii. As a result, both the Roman society and its military became increasingly proletarianised. The Roman state was forced to arm its soldiers at the expense of the state, since many of the soldiers who made up its lower classes were now impoverished proletarii in all but name, and were too poor to afford their own equipment.

The distinction between the heavy infantry types of hastati, principes and triarii began to blur, perhaps because the state was now assuming the responsibility of providing standard-issue equipment to all but the first class of troops, who alone were able to afford their own equipment. By the time of Polybius, the triarii or their successors still represented a distinct heavy infantry type armed with a unique style of cuirass, but the hastati and principes had become indistinguishable.

In addition, the shortage of available manpower led to a greater burden being placed upon its allies (socii) for the provision of allied troops. Where accepted allies could not provide the required force types, the Romans were not averse during this period to hiring mercenaries to fight alongside the legions.

=== Marian legion (107–27 BC) ===
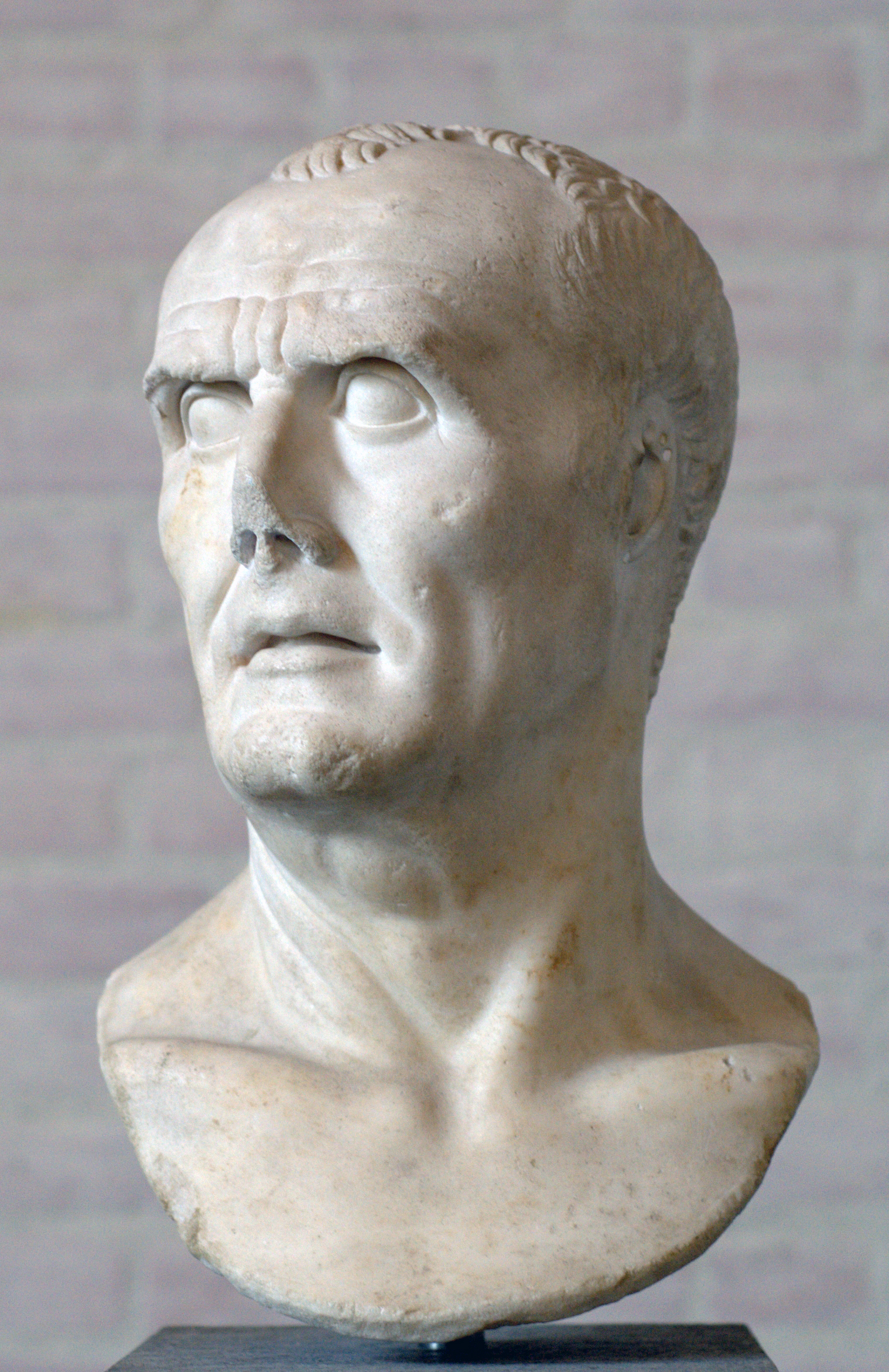
Bust said to be of Marius, instigator of the so-called "Marian reforms"

Modern historiography has regularly cast Marius as abolishing the propertied militia and replacing it with landless soldiers motivated largely by pay. This belief emerges from the ancient literary sources, but rests on a relatively weak basis.

Despite enrolling some three to five thousand volunteers during the Jugurthine War, Gaius Marius assumed command of consular legions recruited via hitherto normal procedure in the following Cimbric War. Conscription continued after Marius's time, especially during the Social War, and the wealth and social background of the men who joined before and after the opening of recruitment changed little. There is little evidence that later Roman armies during the 1st century BC were made up of volunteers; almost all ancient references to army recruitment, outside private armies, involve conscription.

For much of the 20th century, historians held that the property qualification separating the five classes and the capite censi was reduced over the course of the second century to a nugatory level due to a shortage of manpower. The basis for that belief, however, was merely three undated Roman figures for the amount of property required to serve which would serve as evidence for reductions only if forced into a descending order. Many scholars have also now abandoned the notion that Italy suffered in the second century BC any deficit of manpower which would have driven such putative reductions.

Modern historians have also sometimes credited to Marius the abolition of Roman cavalry and light infantry and their replacement with auxilia. There is no direct evidence for this contention, which is driven largely by literary sources' silence on those branches after the 2nd century; continued inscriptional evidence attests both citizen cavalry and light infantry into the end of the republic. The decline of Roman light infantry has been connected not to reform but cost. Because the logistical cost of supporting light infantry and heavy infantry was relatively similar, the Romans chose to deploy heavy infantry in extended and distant campaigns due to their greater combat effectiveness, especially when local levies could substitute for light infantry brought from Rome and Italy.

The changes to the Roman army during the 1st century BC are now more attributed to the Social War and the civil wars from 49 to 31 BC. The large-scale downsizing of Roman cavalry detachments likely emerged from the extension of citizenship to all of Italy. Because Italy's enfranchisement meant that Rome was now directly liable for the cavalry's upkeep rather than their local communities, Rome instead levied auxilia from allies who, by treaty, were responsible for their contingents' upkeep.

Pay remained extremely low – only five asses per day – and irregular. Moreover, although the surviving sources frequently characterise soldiers as "poor", these sources largely reflect the perspectives of the elite, by whom the vast majority of the population were considered "poor" and for whom poverty needed not entail actual landlessness. Many of the soldiers of the 1st century BC possessed modest lands. Nor did the legions meaningfully professionalise: as, in general, both soldiers and commanders served only for short periods intending, respectively, to secure plunder or political advancement from military victory.

After the Social War, the state also started to keep men under arms for longer periods to maintain available experienced manpower, and coupled this with longer terms for commanders, particularly Caesar and Pompey. Client armies emerged but not in the 100s BC but rather in the decades before Caesar's civil war, which broke out in 49 BC.

The legions of the late Republic were, structurally, almost entirely heavy infantry. The legion's main sub-unit was called a cohort and consisted of approximately 480 infantrymen. The cohort was therefore a much larger unit than the earlier maniple sub-unit, and was divided into six centuriae of 80 men each. Each centuria was separated further into 10 "tent groups" (Latin: contubernia) of 8 men each. Legions additionally consisted of a small body, typically 120 men, of Roman legionary cavalry (Latin: equites legionis). The equites were used as scouts and dispatch riders rather than battlefield cavalry. Legions also contained a dedicated artillery crew of perhaps 60 men, who would operate devices such as ballistae.

Each legion was normally partnered with an approximately equal number of allied (non-Roman) auxiliae troops. The addition of allied troops to the Roman army was a formalisation of the earlier arrangement of using light troops from the Socii and Latini, who had received Roman citizenship after the Social War. Auxiliary troops could be formed from either auxiliary light cavalry known as alae, auxiliary light infantry known as cohors auxiliae, or a flexible mixture of the two known as cohors equitata. Cavalry types included mounted archers (Latin: sagittarii) and heavy shock cavalry (Latin: cataphracti or clibanarii). Infantry could be armed with bows, slings, throwing spears, long swords, or thrusting spears. Auxiliary units were originally led by their own chiefs, and, in this period, their internal organisation was left to their commanders.

However, "the most obvious deficiency" of the Roman army remained its shortage of cavalry, especially heavy cavalry; even auxiliary troops were predominantly infantry. Luttwak argues that auxiliary forces largely consisted of Cretan archers, Balearic slingers and Numidian infantry, all of whom fought on foot. As Rome's borders expanded and its adversaries changed from largely infantry-based to largely cavalry-based troops, the infantry-based Roman army began to find itself at a tactical disadvantage, particularly in the East.

After having declined in size following the subjugation of the Mediterranean, the Roman navy underwent short-term upgrading and revitalisation in the late Republic to meet several new demands. Under Caesar, an invasion fleet was assembled in the English Channel to allow the invasion of Britain; under Pompey, a large fleet was raised in the Mediterranean Sea to clear the sea of Cilician pirates. During the civil war that followed, as many as a thousand ships were either constructed or pressed into service from Greek cities.

==== Non-citizen recruitment (49–27 BC) ====
By the time of Julius Caesar in 54 BC, regular legionary units were supplemented by exploratores, a body of scouts, and speculatores, spies who infiltrated enemy camps. Due to the demands of the civil war, the extraordinary measure of recruiting legions from non-citizens was taken by Caesar in Transalpine Gaul (Latin: Gallia Transalpina), by Brutus in Macedonia, and by Pompey in Pharsalus. This irregular and extraordinary recruitment was not, however, typical of recruitment during this period, and Roman law still officially required that legions were recruited from Roman citizens only.

== The army at the height of the Empire ==
=== Imperial legions and reformation of the auxilia (27 BC – 117 AD) ===
By the turn of the millennium, Emperor Augustus' primary military concern was to prevent Roman generals from further usurping the imperial throne. The experience of Caesar and, earlier, Marius and Sulla, had demonstrated the willingness of "emergency" (re-activated previously decommissioned) legions containing troops keen for plunder to follow their generals against the state. Augustus therefore removed the need for such emergency armies by increasing the size of the standing armies to a size sufficient to provide territorial defence on their own. Perhaps due to similar concerns, the legions and auxiliaries of the army were supplemented under the Emperor Augustus by an elite formation of guards dedicated to the protection of the Emperor. The first such unit was based in Rome and were known as the Praetorian Guard, and a second similar formation were known as the Cohortes urbanae.

The legions, which had been a mix of life professionals and civilian campaigners, was altered into a standing army of professionals only. The actual structure of the cohort army remained much the same as in the late Republic, although around the 1st century AD the first cohort of each legion was increased in size to a total of 800 soldiers. However, while the structure of the legions remained much the same, their make-up gradually changed. Whereas early Republican legions had been raised by a draft from eligible Roman citizens, imperial legions were recruited solely on a voluntary basis and from a much wider base of manpower. Likewise, whereas Republican legions had been recruited almost exclusively in Italy, early Imperial legions drew most of their recruits from Roman colonies in the provinces from 68 AD onwards. One estimate places the proportion of Italian troops at 65% under Augustus in c. 1 AD, falling to around 49% by the end of Nero's reign.

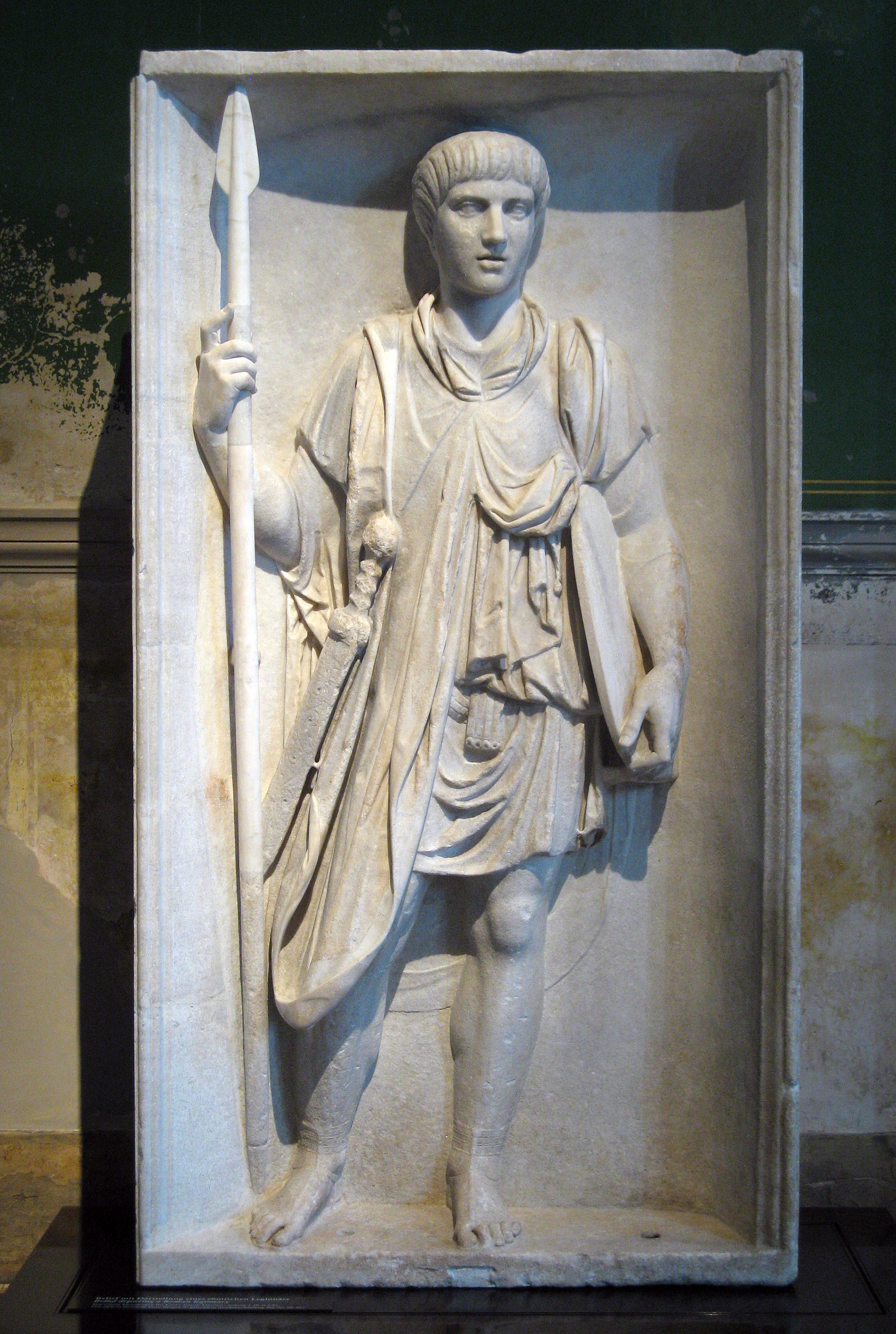
Relief of a Roman legionary out of battle dress, c. AD 100 (Neues Museum, Berlin)

Since the legions were officially open only to Roman citizens, Max Cary and Howard Hayes Scullard argue that at least in some provinces at this time "many provincials must have been recruited who lacked any genuine claim to Roman citizenship but received it unofficially on enlistment," a practice that was to increase in the 2nd century. This is most likely in those provinces where the pool of Roman citizens was not large enough to fulfil the provincial army's recruitment needs. One possible example is Britain, where one estimate puts the citizen pool in the 1st century at only 50,000 out of a total provincial population of around two million.

At the same time as the legions underwent these transformations, the auxilia were reorganized and a number of allied troops were formalised into standing units similar to legions. Rather than being raised re-actively when required, the process of raising auxiliary troops was carried out in advance of conflicts according to annual targets. Whereas the internal organisation of the auxilia had previously been left up to their commanders, in the early empire they were organised into standardised units known as turmae (for cavalry alae) and centuriae (for infantry cohortes). Although never becoming as standardised in their equipment as the legions, and often retaining some national flavour, the size of the units at least was standardised to some degree. Cavalry were formed into either an ala quingenaria of 512 horsemen, or an ala millaria of 1,000 horsemen. Likewise, infantry auxilia could be formed into a cohors quingenaria of 500 men or a cohors millaria of 1,000 men. Mixed cavalry/infantry auxiliaries were typically formed with a larger proportion of foot than horse troops: the cohors equitata quingenaria consisted of 380 foot and 120 horsemen, and the cohors equitata millaria consisted of 760 foot and 240 horsemen.

The vitality of the empire at this point was such that the use of native auxilia in the Roman army did not apparently barbarise the military as some scholars claim was to happen in the late empire. On the contrary, those serving in the auxilia during this period frequently strove to Romanise themselves. They were granted Roman citizenship on retirement, granting them several social advantages, and their sons became eligible for service in the legions.

As with the army, many non-Italians were recruited into the Roman Navy, partly because the Romans had never readily taken to the sea. It appears that the navy was considered to be slightly less prestigious than the auxilia but, like the auxilia, troops could gain citizenship on discharge upon retirement. In terms of structure, each ship was staffed by a group of men approximately equivalent to a century, with ten ships forming a naval squadron.

==== Introduction of vexillationes (76–117 AD) ====
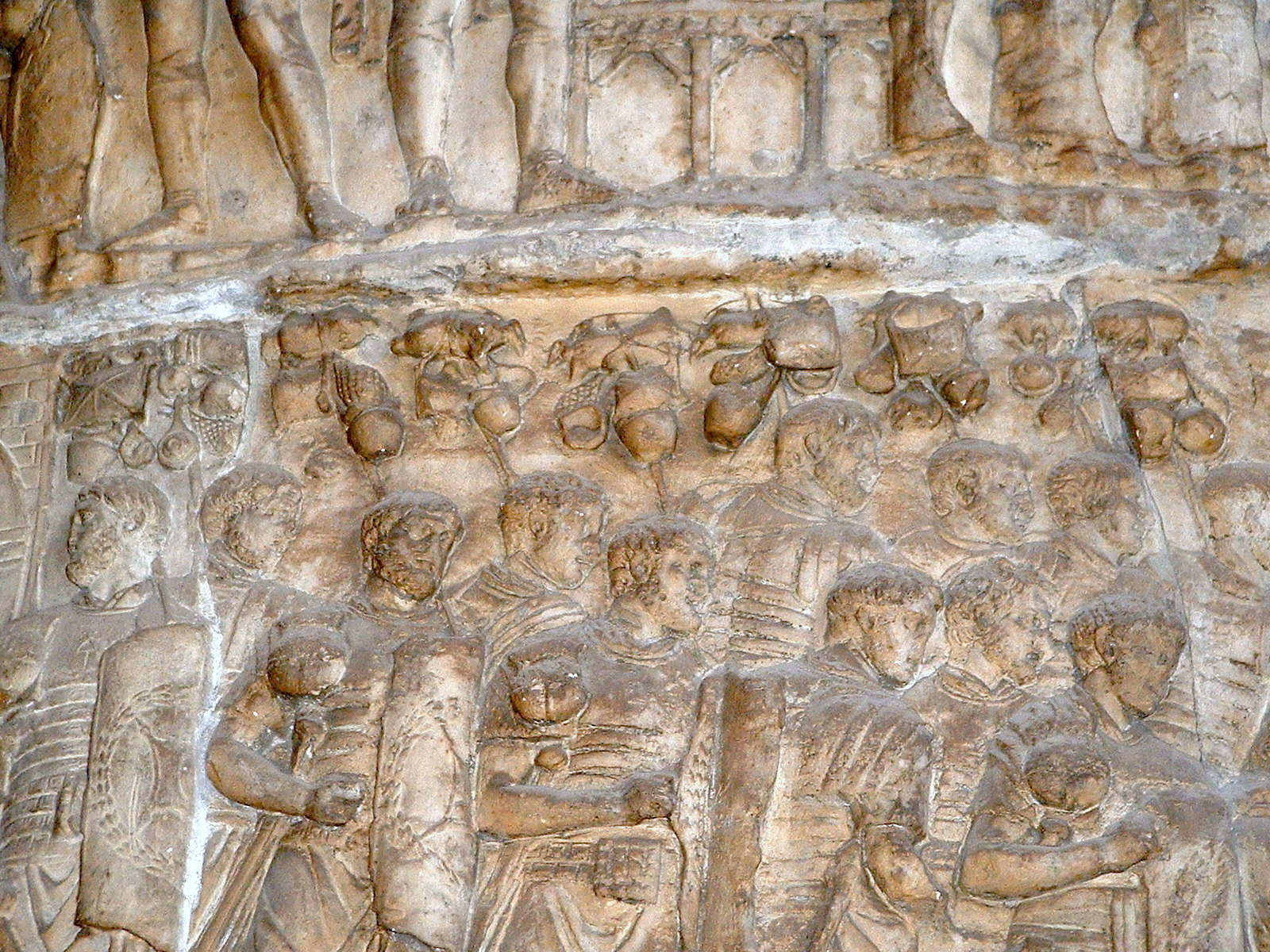
Roman soldiers of around 101 AD from a cast of Trajan's column, c. 113 AD (Victoria and Albert Museum, London)

Through the final years of the 1st century AD, the legions remained the backbone of the Roman army, although the auxilia in fact outnumbered them by up to half as much again. Within the legions, the proportion of troops recruited from within Italy fell gradually after 70 AD. By the close of the 1st century, this proportion had fallen to as low as 22 percent, with the remainder drawn from conquered provinces. Since technically only citizens were allowed to enlist in the legions, where recruits did not possess citizenship then, at least in some instances, citizenship "was simply given [to] them on enlistment". During this time, the borders of the Empire had remained relatively fixed to the extent originally reached under the Emperor Trajan. Because of this, the army was increasingly responsible for protecting existing frontiers rather than expanding into foreign territory, the latter of which had characterised the army's earlier existence. As a result, legions became stationed in largely fixed locations. Although entire legions were occasionally transferred into theatres of war, they remained largely rooted in one or more legionary bases in a province, detaching into smaller bodies of troops (Latin: vexillationes) on demand. This policy eventually led to a split of the military's land-based forces into mobile and fixed troops in the later Empire. In general, the best troops were dispatched as vexillationes, and the remainder left to guard border defenses were of lower quality, perhaps those with injuries or near retirement.

== The army during the decline of the Empire ==
=== Barbarisation of the army (117–253 AD) ===
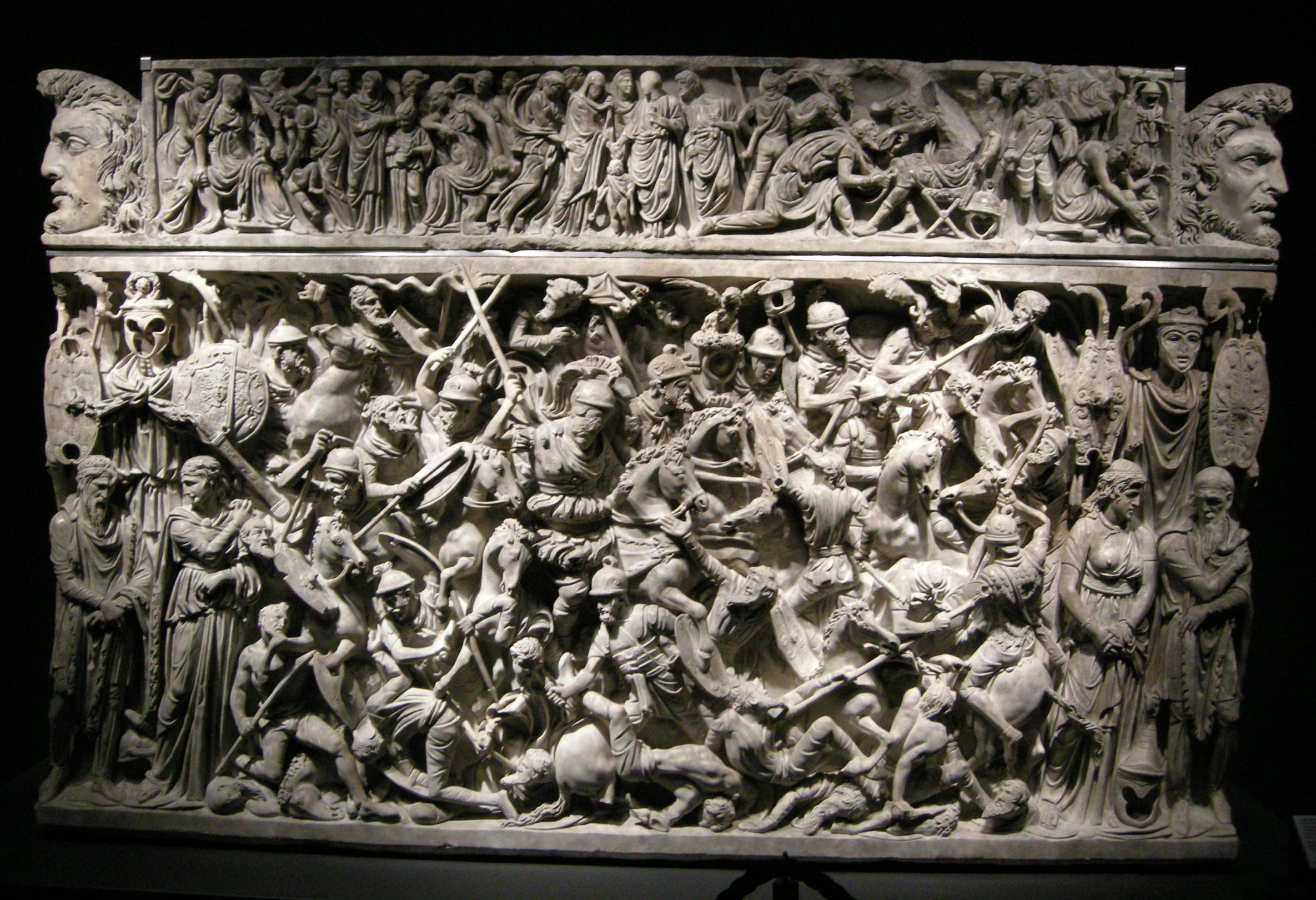
Battle with Germanic troops, on the Portonaccio sarcophagus (190–200)

By the time of the emperor Hadrian the proportion of Italians in the legions had fallen to just ten percent and provincial citizens now dominated. This low figure is probably a direct result of the changing needs of military staffing: a system of fixed border defences (Latin: limes) were established around the Empire's periphery under Hadrian, consolidating Trajan's territorial gains. These called for troops to be stationed permanently in the provinces, a prospect more attractive to locally raised rather than Italian troops. The higher prestige and pay to be found in the Italian dominated Praetorian Guard must also have played a role. The majority of the troops in the legions at the start of the 3rd century AD were from the more Romanised (though non-Italian) provinces, especially Illyria. As the century progressed, more and more barbarians (Latin: barbari) were permitted to settle inside of, and tasked with aiding in the defence of, Rome's borders. As a result, greater numbers of barbarous and semi-barbarous peoples were gradually admitted to the army.

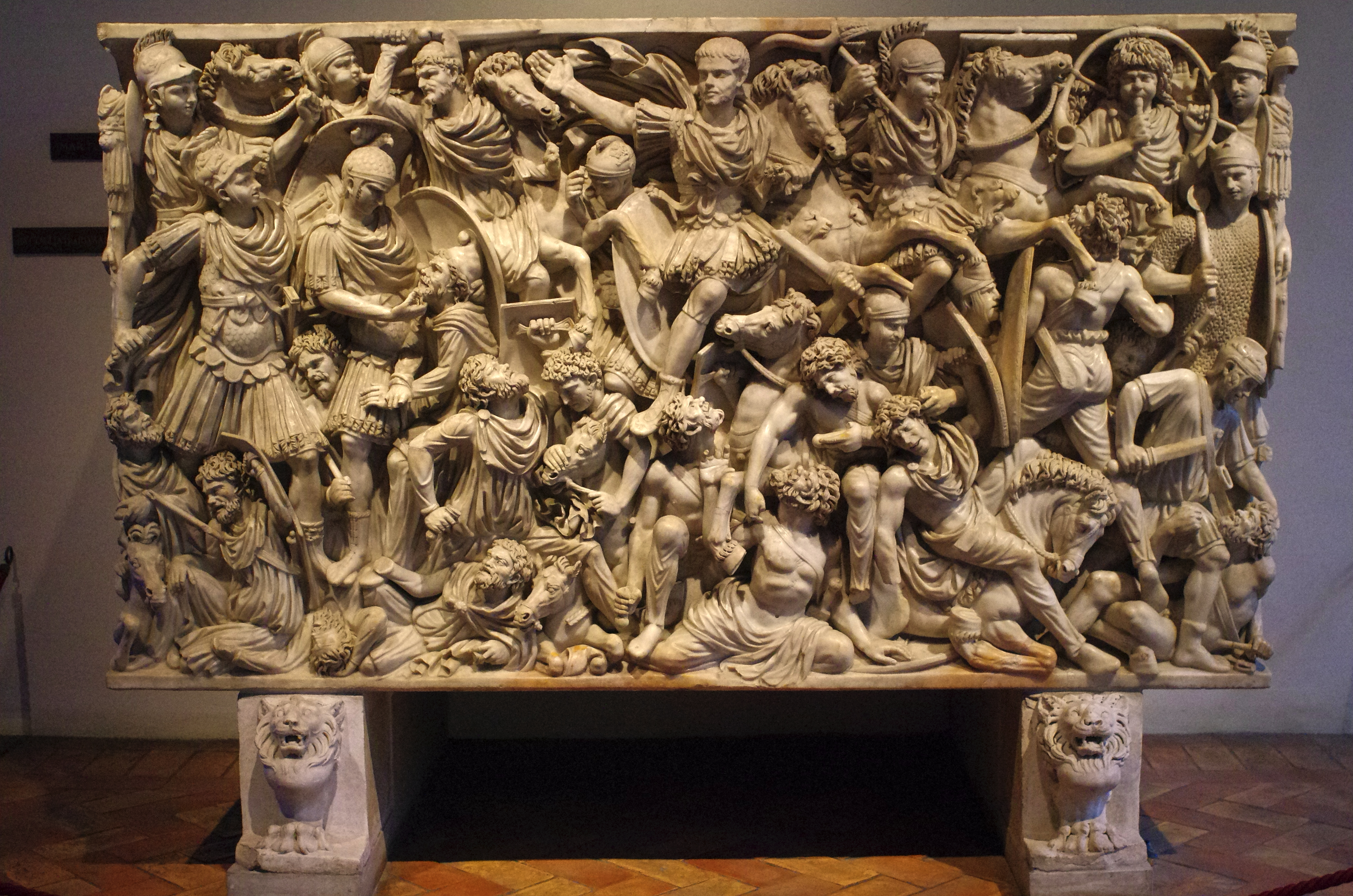
3rd-century Roman soldiers battling barbarian troops on the Ludovisi Battle sarcophagus (250-260)

However, whether this regionalisation of the legions was partnered by a drop in the professionalism of the troops is contested. Antonio Santosuosso argues that the strict discipline and high motivation of the days of Marius had lapsed, but Andrew Alfoldi states that the Illyrian troops were both valiant and warlike, and Tacitus described German recruits as being natural mercenaries (Latin: vivi ad arma nati). It seems that discipline in the legions did slacken, with soldiers granted permission to live with wives outside of military lodgings and permitted to adopt a more lavish and comfortable lifestyle, in contrast to the strict military regimen of earlier years. However, it is by no means certain that this led to any reduction in the effectiveness of the legions, due to the greater ferocity and stature of the barbari recruits. The flavour of the Roman military, however, was now dictated by the increasing number of regional recruits, leading to a partial barbarisation of Rome's military forces beginning in this period. The barbarisation of the lower ranks was paralleled by a concurrent barbarisation of its command structure, with the Roman senators who had traditionally provided its commanders becoming entirely excluded from the army. By 235 AD the Emperor himself, the figurehead of the entire military, was a man born outside of Italy to non-Italian parents.

"A young nobleman, strong of hand and quick of mind and far more intelligent than your average barbarian ... the ardour of his face and eyes showed the burning spirit within. He had fought on our side in previous campaigns and earned the right to become a Roman citizen; indeed, he was even elevated to the rank of Equestrian."
Velleius Paterculus, Roman History, 2.108

The gradual inclusion of greater numbers of non-citizen troops into the military was taken a further step by the creation under Hadrian of a new type of force in addition to the legions and auxilia, known as numeri. Formed in bodies of around 300 irregular troops, the numeri were drawn from subjugate provinces and peoples of client-states or even from beyond the borders of the empire. They were both less regimented and less Romanised than auxiliary troops, with a "pronounced national character," including native dress and native war cries. The introduction of the numeri was a response to the need for cheap troops, who were nevertheless fierce and provided a force balance of light infantry and cavalry. They were therefore largely less well armed and less well trained than auxilia or legions, although more prestigious elite irregular native troops were also utilised. However, the legions still made up around one half of the Roman army at this point.

=== Successive crises (238–359 AD) ===
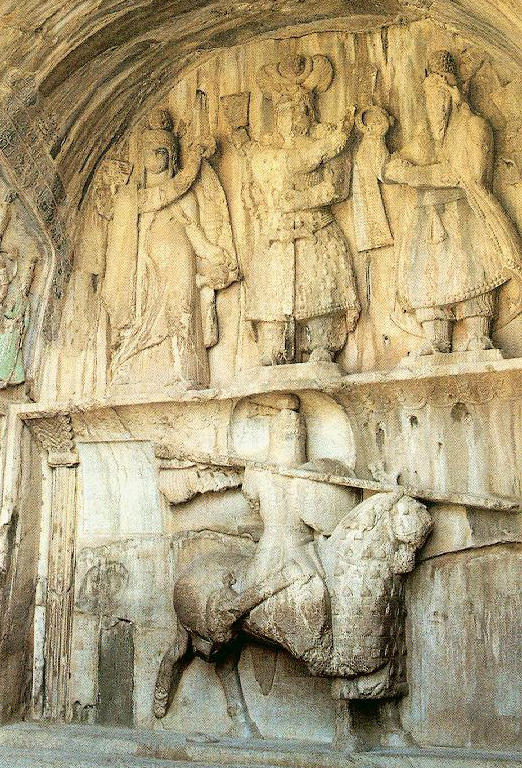
A 6th-century carving of a Sassanid armoured knight, the model for the Roman catafractarii

By the late Empire, enemy forces in both the East and West were "sufficiently mobile and sufficiently strong to pierce [the Roman] defensive perimeter on any selected axis of penetration"; from the 3rd century onwards, both Germanic tribes and Persian armies pierced the frontiers of the Roman Empire. In response, the Roman army underwent a series of changes, more organic and evolutionary than the deliberate military reforms of the Republic and early Empire. A stronger emphasis was placed upon ranged combat ability of all types, such as field artillery, hand-held ballistae, archery and darts. Roman forces also gradually became more mobile, with one cavalryman for every three infantrymen, compared to one in forty in the early Empire. Additionally, the Emperor Gallienus took the revolutionary step of forming an entirely cavalry field army, which was kept as a mobile reserve at the city of Milan in northern Italy. It is believed that Gallienus facilitated this concentration of cavalry by stripping the legions of their integral mounted element. A diverse range of cavalry regiments existed, including catafractarii or clibanarii, scutarii, and legionary cavalry known as promoti. Collectively, these regiments were known as equites. Around 275 AD, the proportion of catafractarii was also increased. There is some disagreement over exactly when the relative proportion of cavalry increased, whether Gallienus' reforms occurred contemporaneously with an increased reliance on cavalry, or whether these are two distinct events. Alfoldi appears to believe that Gallienus' reforms were contemporaneous with an increase in cavalry numbers. He argues that, by 258, Gallienus had made cavalry the predominant troop type in the Roman army in place of heavy infantry, which dominated earlier armies. According to Warren Treadgold, however, the proportion of cavalry did not change between the early 3rd and early 4th centuries.

Larger groups of barbari began to settle in Rome's territories around this time, and the troops they were contracted to provide to the Roman army were no longer organised as numeri but rather were the forerunners of the later rented native armies known as federated troops (Latin: foederati). (Note: The word can mean both a federated people, and also the units of allied troops later supplied by those people.) Though they served under Roman officers, the troops of these units were far more barbarised than the numeri, lacked Romanisation of either military structure or personal ideology, and were ineligible for Roman citizenship upon discharge. These native troops were not permitted to fight in native war bands under their own leaders, unlike the later foederati; instead, these troops were split into small groups attached to other Roman units. They existed therefore as a halfway house between numeri, who were encouraged to be Romanised, and the foederati, who raised officers from their own ranks and were almost entirely self-dependent.

=== Comitatenses and limitanei (284–395 AD) ===
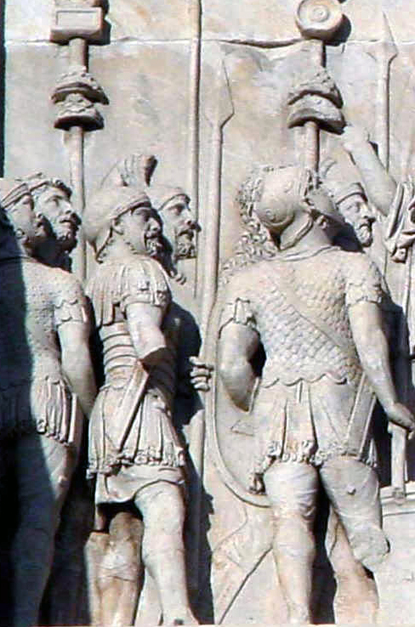
Bearded Roman troops as pictured on a triumphal arch, c. 312 AD, however, the sculptured panels were re-used from earlier monuments of Trajanic date.

A distinction between frontier guard troops and more mobile reserve forces had emerged with the use of certain troops to permanently man frontiers such as Hadrian's Wall in Britannia in the 2nd century AD. The competing demands of manned frontiers and strategic reserve forces had led to the division of the military into four types of troops by the early 4th century:

- The limitanei or riparienses patrolled the border and defended the border fortifications. According to some older theories, the limitanei were "settled and hereditary" militia that were "tied to their posts." But according to most recent research, the limitanei were originally regular soldiers, including infantry, cavalry, and river flotillas, although they eventually became settled militia. According to Luttwak, by the time of Constantine I, the cunei of cavalry, and auxilia of infantry, both usually around 500 men strong, were local provincial units under sector commanders. According to Pat Southern and Karen Dixon, the legiones, auxilia, and cunei of the border armies were part of the limitanei, but higher-status than the older cohortes and alae which they had replaced.
- The comitatenses and the palatini were central field armies, usually stationed in the interior or rear areas of the empire as a strategic reserve. The permanent field armies of the palatini and comitatenses were expansions of the field escort of the emperors, which were larger than bodyguard units, becoming temporary field armies known as the sacer comitatus. The palatini were "praesental" armies, central field armies under the direct command of the emperors, while the comitatenses, were usually the regional field armies, although units could be moved between the two forces. The initial expansion of the emperor's escort units, although substantial, still did not form a large enough force to campaign independently until further expanded by Diocletian and Constantine I.
- The emperor Constantine I created the scholae to replace the old praetorian guard. The scholae were his personal guard, and were mainly equipped as cavalry. Vogt suggests that the scholae formed two small central reserves (Latin: scholae) held to the strategic rear even of the comitatenses, one each in the presence of the emperors of West and East respectively.

Of the four troop types, the limitanei (border guards) were once considered to have been of the lowest quality, consisting largely of peasant-soldiers that were both "grossly inferior" to the earlier legions and inferior also to their counterparts in the mobile field armies. However, more recent work establishes that the limitanei were regular soldiers.

While the limitanei were supposed to deal with policing actions and low-intensity incursions, the duty of responding to more serious incidents fell upon the regional or provincial troops of the reduced field reserves of the comitatenses. The countering of the very largest scale incursions on a strategic scale was the task of the mobile field troops, the palatini and comitatenses diverted to strengthen the field armies, and possibly accompanied by the emperor's scholae. Both border and field armies consisted of a mix of infantry and cavalry units although the weight of cavalry was, according to some authorities, greater in the mobile field armies. Overall, approximately one quarter of the army consisted of cavalry troops but their importance is uncertain. Older works such as the Eleventh Edition of the Encyclopædia Britannica (1911) state that the Roman military of the late Empire was "marked by that predominance of the horseman which characterised the earlier centuries of the Middle Ages," but many more recent authors believe that the infantry remained predominant.

There is some dispute about whether this new military structure was put into place under the Emperor Diocletian or Constantine since both reorganised the Roman Army in the late 3rd and early 4th centuries to some degree. Both Diocletian and even his predecessor of thirty years Gallienus may already have controlled mobile strategic reserves to assist the empire's border forces; either Diocletian or Constantine expanded this nascent force into permanent field armies.

Recruitment from amongst Roman citizens had become greatly curtailed as a consequence of a declining population, "cripplingly numerous" categories of those exempted from military service and the spread of Christianity with its pacifist message. (Note: Gibbon writes that due to "the abuse of Christianity ... the active virtues of society were discouraged; and the last remains of military spirit were buried in the cloister.") Together, these factors culminated in "the withdrawal of the urban class from all forms of military activity." In their place, much of Rome's military were now recruited from non-Italian peoples living within the empire's borders. Many of these people were barbarians or semi-barbarians recently settled from lands beyond the empire, including several colonies of Carpi, Bastarnae and Sarmatians.

Although units described as legiones existed as late as the 5th century in both the border and field armies, the legionary system was very different from that of the principate and early empire. Since the term legion continued to be used, it is unclear exactly when the structure and role of the legions changed. In the 3rd or 4th century, however, the legions' role as elite heavy infantry was substantially reduced and may have evaporated entirely. Instead, those "legions" that remained were no longer drawn exclusively (and perhaps hardly at all) from Roman citizens. Either Diocletian or Constantine reorganised the legions into smaller infantry units who, according to some sources, were more lightly armoured than their forebears. Their lighter armament may have been either because they "would not consent to wear the same weight of body armour as the legionaries of old" or, as in at least one documented instance, because they were prohibited from wearing heavy armour by their general in order to increase their mobility. 4th-century legions were at times only one sixth the size of early imperial legions, and they were armed with some combination of spears, bows, slings, darts and swords, reflecting a greater contemporary emphasis on ranged fighting. The auxilia and numeri had also largely disappeared. Constantine further increased the proportion of German troops in the regular army; their cultural impact was so great that even legionaries began wearing German dress. At the start of Diocletian's reign, the Roman army numbered about 390,000 men, but by the end of his reign he successfully increased the number to 581,000 men.

==== Adoption of barbarian allies (358–395 AD) ====
By the late 4th century, the Empire had become chronically deficient in raising sufficient troops from amongst its own population. As an alternative, taxation raised internally was increasingly used to subsidise growing numbers of barbarian recruits. The Romans had, for some time, recruited individual non-Roman soldiers into regular military units. In 358 AD, this practice was accelerated by the wholescale adoption of the entire Salian Franks people into the Empire, providing a ready pool of such recruits. In return for being allowed to settle as foederatii in northern Gallia on the near side of the Rhine, the Franks were expected to defend the Empire's borders in their territory and provide troops to serve in Roman units.

In 376, a large band of Goths asked Emperor Valens for permission to settle on the southern bank of the Danube River on terms similar to the Franks. The Goths were also accepted into the empire as foederati; however, they rebelled later that year and defeated the Romans at the Battle of Adrianople. The heavy losses that the Roman military suffered during this defeat ironically forced the Roman Empire to rely still further on such foederati troops to supplement its forces. In 382, the practice was radically extended when federated troops were signed up en masse as allied contingents of laeti and foederatii troops separate from existing Roman units. Near-constant civil wars during the period 408 and 433 between various Roman usurpers, emperors and their supposed deputies such as Constantine III, Constantius III, Aetius and Bonifacius resulted in further losses, necessitating the handing over of more taxable land to foederati.

The size and composition of these allied forces remains in dispute. Santosuosso argues that foederati regiments consisted mostly of cavalry that were raised both as a temporary levy for a specific campaign need and, in some cases, as a permanent addition to the army. Hugh Elton believes that the importance of foederati has been overstated in traditional accounts by historians such as A.H.M. Jones. Elton argues that the majority of soldiers were probably non-Italian Roman citizens, (Note: Elton argues from the proportion of Roman names to non-Roman names from 350 to 476.) while Santosuosso believes that the majority of troops were almost certainly non-citizen barbari.

=== Collapse in the West and survival in the East (395–476 AD) ===
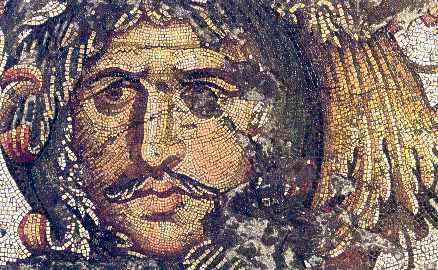
Mosaic of what is presumed to be a Gothic war leader. The Goths were employed as foederati by the Romans in the 5th century

The non-federated mobile field army, known as the comitatenses, was eventually split into a number of smaller field armies: a central field army under the emperor's direct control, known as the comitatensis palatina or praesentalis, and several regional field armies. Historians Santosuosso and Vogt agree that the latter gradually degraded into low-quality garrison units similar to the limitanei that they either supplemented or replaced. By the 5th century, a significant portion of Western Rome's main military strength lay in rented barbarian mercenaries known as foederati.

As the 5th century progressed, many of the Empire's original borders had been either wholly or partially denuded of troops to support the central field army. In 395, the Western Roman Empire had several regional field armies in Italy, Illyricum, Gallia, Britannia and Africa, and about twelve border armies. By about 430, two more field armies were established in Hispania and Tingitania but the central government had lost control of Britannia as well as much of Gaul, Hispania, and Africa. In the same period, the Eastern Roman Empire had two palatine field armies (at Constantinople), three regional field armies (in the East, in Thrace, and in Illyricum) and fifteen frontier armies.

"We received a terrible rumour about events in the West. They told us that Rome was under siege, and the only safety for its citizens was that which they could buy with gold, and when that had been stripped from them, they were besieged again, so that they lost not only their possessions, but also their lives. Our messenger gave the news in a faltering voice, and could hardly speak for sobbing. The city which had captured the world was now itself captured"
Jerome, Letters, 127

As Roman troops were spread increasingly thin over its long border, the Empire's territory continued to dwindle in size as the population of the empire declined. Barbarian war bands increasingly began to penetrate the Empire's vulnerable borders, both as settlers and invaders. In 451, the Romans defeated Attila the Hun, but only with assistance from a confederation of foederatii troops, which included Visigoths, Franks and Alans. As barbarian incursions continued, some advancing as far as the heart of Italy, Rome's borders began to collapse, with frontier forces swiftly finding themselves cut off deep in the enemy's rear.

Simultaneously, barbarian troops in Rome's pay came to be "in a condition of almost perpetual turbulence and revolt" from 409 onwards. In 476 these troops finally unseated the last emperor of the Western Roman Empire. The Eastern Roman forces continued to defend the Eastern Roman (Byzantine) Empire until its fall in 1453.

The former Oxford University historian Adrian Goldsworthy has argued that the cause of the fall of the Roman Empire in the West should not be blamed on barbarization of the late Roman Army, but on its recurrent civil wars, which led to its inability to repel or defeat invasions from outside its frontiers. The East Roman or Byzantine empire on the other hand had fewer civil wars to contend with in the late fourth and early fifth centuries, or in the years from 383 to 432 A.D.

== Bibliography ==
=== Primary sources ===
- Livy, Titus (1998). "Rise of Rome". From the Founding of the City. Translated by Luce, T. J. Oxford: Oxford University Press. ISBN 0-19-282296-9.
- Ammianus Marcellinus, Res Gestae a Fine Corneli Taciti on The Latin Library.
- Notitia Dignitatum
- Polybius: The Rise of the Roman Empire at LacusCurtius print: Harvard University Press, 1927. (Translation by W. R. Paton).
- Tacitus: The Annals.

=== Secondary and tertiary sources ===
- Alfoldi, Andrew (1956). "The Crisis of the Empire (AD 249–270)". The Cambridge Ancient History. XII: The Imperial Crisis and Recovery (AD 193–324). ISBN 0-521-30199-8.
- Boak, Arthur, A History of Rome to 565 A.D., The MacMillan Company, 1957
- Armstrong, Jeremy; Fronda, Michael P, eds. (2020). Romans at war: soldiers, citizens, and society in the Roman republic. Routledge. pp. 283–96. ISBN 978-1-138-48019-3.
  - Gauthier, François. "The transformation of the Roman army in the last decades of the Republic". In Armstrong & Fronda (2020), pp. 283–96.
  - Rosenstein, Nathan. "Epilogue". In Armstrong & Fronda (2020), pp. 297–307.
- Campbell, Brian, The Army, in The Crisis of Empire, AD 193–337, in The Cambridge Ancient History, Second Edition, Vol. XII, ISBN 0-521-30199-8.
- Cary, Max; Scullard, Howard, A History of Rome, The MacMillan Press Ltd, 1979, ISBN 0-333-27830-5.
- Cadiou, François (2018). L'armée imaginaire: les soldats prolétaires dans les légions romaines au dernier siècle de la République. Mondes anciens (in French). Paris: Les Belles Lettres. ISBN 978-2-251-44765-0.
- Elton, Hugh, Warfare in Roman Europe AD 350–425, Oxford University Press, 1996, ISBN 0-19-815241-8.
- Connolly, Peter. Greece and Rome at War. Barnsley, S. Yorkshire: Frontline Books, 2012. ISBN 978-1-84832-609-5. First published in Great Britain by Macdonald Phoebus Ltd., 1981. Reprinted by Greenhill Books, 1998. Updated and reprinted by Greenhill Books, 2006.
- Evans, Richard John (1995). Gaius Marius: a political biography (PDF) (DLitt et Phil thesis). University of South Africa.
- Gabba, Emilio, Republican Rome, The Army and The Allies, University of California Press, 1976, ISBN 0-520-03259-4.
- Gibbon, Edward: The Decline and Fall of the Roman Empire (print: Penguin Books, 1985, ISBN 0-14-043189-6).
- Gruen, Erich (1995). The last generation of the Roman republic. Berkeley: University of California Press. ISBN 0-520-02238-6.
- Goldsworthy, Adrian, In the Name of Rome: The Men Who Won the Roman Empire, Weidenfeld & Nicolson, 2003, ISBN 0-297-84666-3.
- Goldsworthy, Adrian. The Complete Roman Army. New York: Thames and Hudson, Inc., 2011. ISBN 978-0-500-28899-3. Originally published in hardcover in 2003.
- Grant, Michael, The History of Rome, Faber and Faber, 1993, ISBN 0-571-11461-X.
- Hassall, Mark (2000). "The High Empire, AD 70–192". The Cambridge Ancient History. XI. ISBN 0-521-26335-2.
- Heather, Peter, The Fall of the Roman Empire: A New History, Macmillan Publishers, 2005, ISBN 0-330-49136-9.
- Jones, Arnold, The Later Roman Empire, Johns Hopkins University Press, 1964, ISBN 0-8018-3285-3.
- Keppie, Lawrence, The Making of the Roman Army, Barnes & Noble Books, 1984, ISBN 978-0-389-20447-3.
- Luttwak, Edward (1976). 'The Grand Strategy of the Roman Empire. Johns Hopkins University Press. ISBN 0-8018-2158-4.
- Mattingly, David, An Imperial Possession-Britain in the Roman Empire, Allen Lane, 2006, ISBN 0-14-014822-1.
- Matyszak, Philip, The Enemies of Rome, Thames and Hudson, 2004, ISBN 0-500-25124-X.
- Theodor Mommsen, The History of Rome, Indypublish.com, 2008, ISBN 1-4142-7314-2
- Pallottino, Massimo, The Etruscans. Penguin Books. 1975, ISBN 0-253-32080-1.
- Probst, Peter (2008). "Review of "The army in the Roman revolution"". Bryn Mawr Classical Review. ISSN 1055-7660.
- Rafferty, David (2021). "Review of "L'armée imaginaire: les soldats prolétaires dans les légions romaines au dernier siècle de la République"". Bryn Mawr Classical Review. ISSN 1055-7660.
- Rich, J W (1983). "The supposed Roman manpower shortage of the later second century BC". Historia: Zeitschrift für Alte Geschichte. 32 (3): 287–331. ISSN 0018-2311. JSTOR 4435854.
- Runciman, Steven (1965). The Fall of Constantinople: 1453. Cambridge: Cambridge University Press. ISBN 0-521-39832-0.
- Santosusso, Antonio, Storming the Heavens: Soldiers, Emperors and Civilians in the Roman Empire, Westview Press, 2001, ISBN 0-8133-3523-X.
- Shochat, Yanir (1980). Recruitment and the programme of Tiberius Gracchus. Latomus. ISBN 978-2-87031-109-7.
- Smith, Richard, Service in the Post-Marian Roman Army, Manchester University Press, 1958, ASIN B0000CK67F.
- Southern, Pat; Dixon, Karen, The Late Roman Army, 1996, ISBN 0-415-22296-6.
- Taylor, Michael J (2019). "Tactical reform in the late Roman republic: the view from Italy". Historia: Zeitschrift für Alte Geschichte. 68 (1): 76–94. doi:10.25162/historia-2019-0004. ISSN 0018-2311. S2CID 165437350.
- Taylor, Michael J (2023). "Goodbye to all that: the Roman citizen militia after the great wars". In Balbo, Mattia; Santangelo, Federico (eds.). A community in transition: Rome between Hannibal and the Gracchi. Oxford University Press. pp. 146–64. ISBN 978-0-19-765524-5.
- Treadgold, Warren, Byzantium and its Army, Stanford University Press, 1995, ISBN 0-8047-3163-2.
- Vogt, Joseph (1993). The Decline of Rome. Weidenfeld. ISBN 0-297-81392-7.
- Webster, Graham (1969). The Roman Imperial Army. University of Oklahoma Press. ISBN 978-0806-13000-2.
