= Mikel Ruffinelli =

American woman with the widest hip (born 1973)

- Born: 1973 or 1974 (age 52–53); Los Angeles
- Citizenship: American
- Occupations: Model, housewife
- Known for: Widest hips (8ft)
- Height: 1.62 m (5 ft 4 in)
- Spouse: Reggie Brooks (m. 2002)
- Children: 4

Mikel Ruffinelli is an American woman who currently holds the record of widest hips in the world, according to the World Record Academy. Her weight is more than 420 pounds (190 kg), and her hips measure an unusual 8 feet (2.4 m) in circumference, although her waist is only 3 feet 4 inches (102 cm). She is 5 feet 4 inches (1.63 m) tall.

== Early life, marriage and pregnancy ==
Ruffinelli was a normal-sized young woman, and in her early 20s weighed an above average 13 stone (180 lb). At 22, she put on 4 stone (56 lb) after having her first child, Andrew. After daughters Destynee, Autumn, and Justyce followed, her weight and hips ballooned further.

She eats an average 5,000 calories a day.

It is possible that this extraordinary accumulation of fat tissue is an advanced stage of a medical condition called lipedema.

== See also ==
- Obesity
