= Relief depicting a Roman legionary (Berlin SK 887) =

- de: Relief mit der Darstellung eines römischen Legionärs
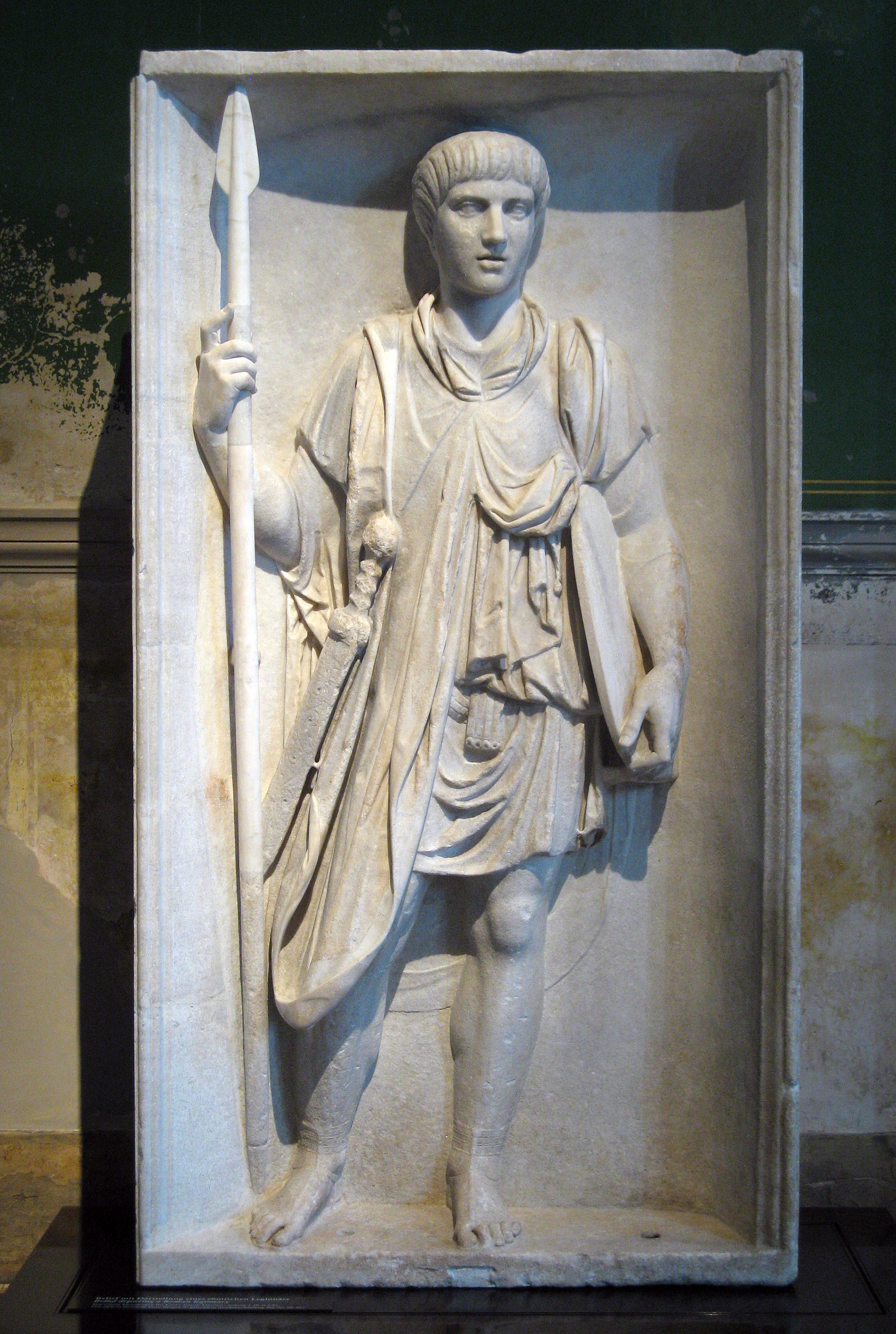
- Relief depicting a Roman legionary (Berlin SK 887)
- Year: End of the first century AD
- Catalogue: Berlin SK 887
- Medium: Grey-blue marble
- Subject: Roman Praetorian
- Dimensions: 159 cm × 86 cm (63 in × 34 in)
- Location: Neues Museum
- Owner: Antikensammlung Berlin

A Relief depicting a Roman legionary (German: Relief mit der Darstellung eines römischen Legionärs) is located in the Pergamonmuseum and belongs to the Antikensammlung Berlin. The relief was created at the end of the first century AD and was discovered in 1800 at Pozzuoli.

The relief is 159 cm high and 86 cm wide and is made of grey-blue marble. It depicts a Roman Praetorian, a member of the Roman elite forces and bodyguard of the Emperor. He wears a Tunica with the Paenula (a cone-shaped cloak made of linen or wool) over it. The tunica is pulled up to knee height by a belt (cingulum), part of which can be seen poking out from under the paenula. He carries a small shield, called a parma, under his left arm and his sword hangs over his shoulder on the other side. In his hand he holds a short javelin.

The praetorian is carved from the background in very high relief. The left edge of the frame had to be restored, but the right and upper edges mostly survive in the original. The relief probably belonged to a triangular base. Sculpture on display in the University Museum of Philadelphia might be fragments of the other two sides. On one of these another praetorian is depicted and on the third there are two legionaries from the northern auxiliaries. It is suggested that this base supported an equestrian statue of the Emperor Domitian, which would have been reworked into a Triumphal arch for Trajan at Puteoli after Domitian's death and damnatio memoriae. The relief was found at Puteoli in 1800 and acquired for Berlin at Rome in 1830.

== Bibliography ==
- A. Conze, Beschreibung der antiken Skulpturen mit Ausschluss der pergamenischen Fundstücke (Berlin 1891), pp. 358–359, no. 887.
- E. Gabrici, "Bassorilievi marmorei rappresentanti soldati romani, e pezzi di una iscrizione onoraria latina del periodo degli Antonini", Notizie degli scavi 1909, pp. 212–215.
- R. Grüssinger, "Relief mit Darstellung eines römischen Soldaten", iDAI Arachne 1062628 (Deutsches Archäologisches Institut, n.d.).
- H. I. Flower, "A Tale of Two Monuments: Domitian, Trajan, and Some Praetorians at Puteoli (AE 1973, 137)", American Journal of Archaeology 105 (2001), pp. 625–648.
- N. Hackländer, "Relief mit der Darstellung eines Legionärs", in B. Knittlmayer and W.-D. Heilmeyer, eds., Die Antikensammlung: Altes Museum – Pergamonmuseum (Berlin 1998), pp. 211–212, no. 127.
- E. H. Hall, "A Roman Relief from Pozzuoli", The Museum Journal 4 (1913), pp. 142–146.
- E. Hübner, Relief eines römischen Kriegers im Museum zu Berlin (Winckelmannsprogramm der archäologischen Gesellschaft zu Berlin 26. Berlin 1866).
- H. Kähler, "Der Trajansbogen in Puteoli", in G. Mylonas, ed., Studies Presented to D.M. Robinson (St. Louis 1951) I, pp. 430–439.
- I. B. Romano, Classical Sculpture: Catalogue of the Cypriot, Greek, and Roman Stone Sculpture in the University of Pennsylvania Museum of Archaeology and Anthropology (Philadelphia 2006), pp. 255–266, no. 123.
- M. Ruggiero, Degli scavi di antichità nelle province di Terraferma dell'antico regno di Napoli dal 1743 al 1876 (Naples 1888).
- J. Sieveking, Römisches Soldatenrelief (Sitzungsberichte der Bayerische Akademie der Wissenschaften, Jahrgang 1919, Abhandlung 6. Munich 1919).
