= Lucius Duccius Rufinus =

Standard-bearer of Roman Legion IX Hispana

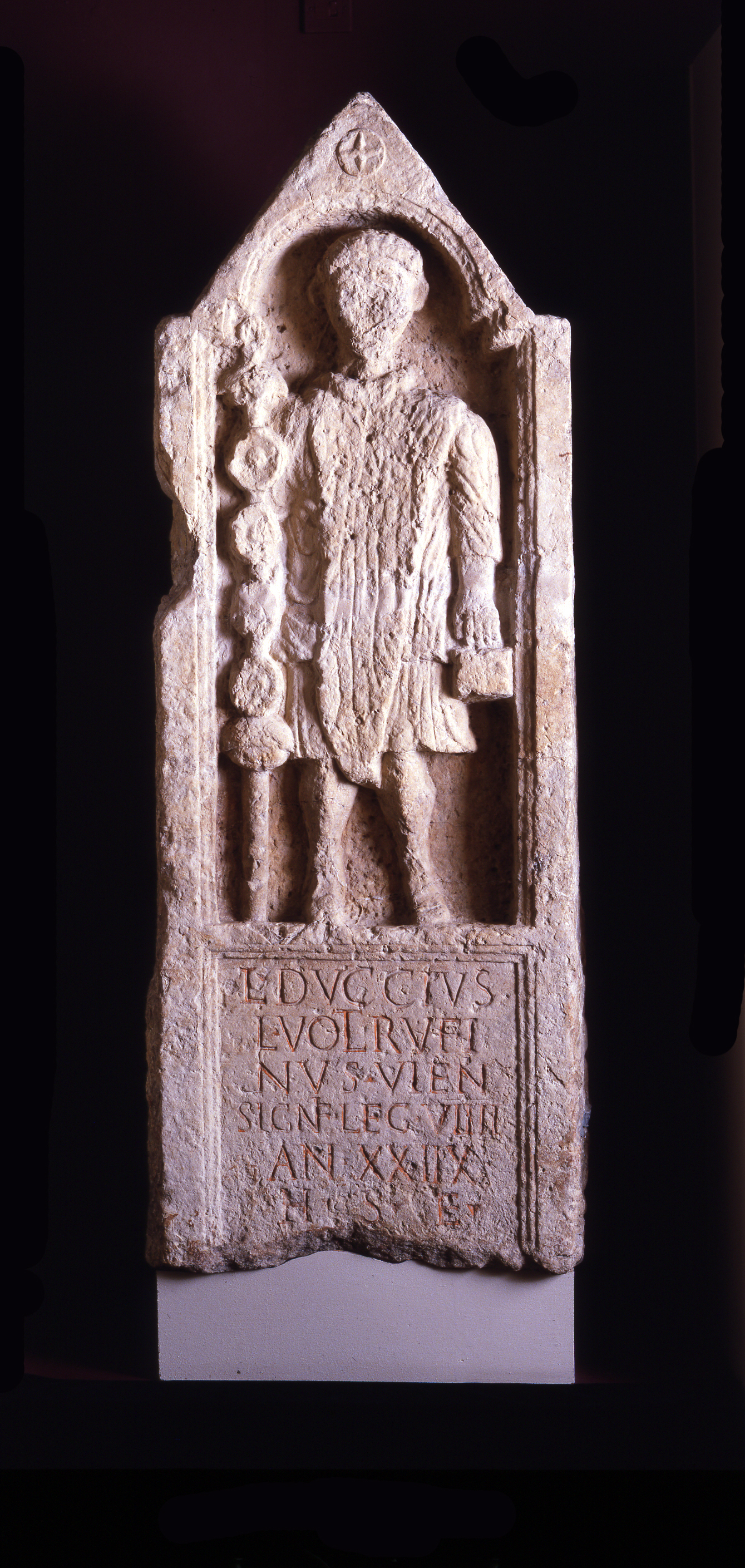
- Tombstone of Lucius Duccius Rufinus
- Died: Eboracum
- Military career
- Allegiance: Roman Empire
- Rank: Signifer
- Unit: Legio IX Hispana

Lucius Duccius Rufinus was a standard-bearer of Legio IX Hispana.

== Discovery ==
Rufinus is known only from his carved limestone tombstone, which was discovered in 1688 at Holy Trinity Church, Micklegate, in York. The circumstances of its discovery are first described by Ralph Thoresby in a letter to the Royal Society in 1706: "This monument was found in Trinity-yard in Mickelgate at York, and was happily, rescued by my Honoured Friend, Dr Bryan Fairfax, from the brutish workmen who had broke it in the middle, and were going to make use of it... but by the Gentleman's direction it was placed upright with the inscription outwards".

By 1732 the tombstone had been moved to Ribston Hall near Wetherby where it was in a garden owned by Sir Henry Goodwick. It was donated to the Yorkshire Museum in 1847 by Mr Joseph Dent, then owner of Ribston Hall.

== Description ==
It is believed to date from between AD 71 and around AD 125.

The monument is 6 feet 2 inches (1.9 m) high by 2 feet 2 inches (0.66 m) wide, with a gabled top which is marked with an encircled cross. It depicts a male figure standing and facing forwards. The figure is depicted in military undress uniform holding a vexillum in one hand and a box of writing tablets in the other.

=== Inscription ===
The inscription, carved in six lines, reads:

L(VCIVS) DVCCIVS; L(VCI FILIVS) VOLT(INA) (TRIBV) RVFI; NVS (DOMO) VIEN(NA); SIGNIF(IER) LEG(IONIS) VIIII: AN(NORVM) XXIIX: H(IC) S(ITVS) E(ST) Lucius Duccius Rufinus, son of Lucius, of the Voltinian tribe, from Vienne, a standard-bearer of the Ninth Legion, 28 years old. He is laid here.

== Interpretation ==
The monument has been described as "of exceptional interest", particularly for its treatment of the objects that indicate Duccius Rufinus's office. The inscription identifies a great deal about Rufinus' life. He was from modern-day France, is named using the tria nomina of Roman citizens, and is shown with the tools of his position. He holds a vexillum in one hand a box in the other. The box may refer to the role of the standard-bearer as a record-keeper and the person responsible in a centuria for the 'burial fund'. In this case the fund may have paid for his memorial.
