= Rufino (given name) =

Rufino is a given name. Notable people with the name include:

- Rufino Jiao Santos, Filipino Cardinal of the Roman Catholic Church
- Rufino Jose Cuervo, Colombian writer
- Rufino Segovia del Burgo, Spanish football player
- Rufino Sescon, Filipino Bishop
- Rufino Tamayo, Mexican painter
- Fladimir Rufino Piazzi Júnior, (born 1978), Brazilian footballer
